= List of postal entities =

This is a list of postal entities by country. It includes:

- The governmental authority responsible for postal matters.
- The regulatory authority for the postal sector. Postal regulation may include the establishment of postal policies, postal rates, postal services offered, budgeting for and financing postal operations. Where no independent postal regulator has been established, these tasks may be undertaken by the government or the operator(s). They may be carried out by a single entity or spread out amongst multiple government, quasi-government or private entities.
- The designated postal operator of that country (normally the public postal service). Notable postal operators other than the designated operator, if any, may also be listed. Postal operations involve the execution of domestic and international postal services to include the receipt, transportation and delivery of authorized classes of mail, specialized mailing services, the operation of postal facilities and the sale of postage, philatelic materials and mailing supplies.

== List ==
=== UPU members ===
The following list uses the structure and terminology of the document Status and structures of postal entities in the UPU member countries. This document, published in 2009 by the Universal Postal Union (UPU), contains data for 162 of the 191 countries and territories that were then UPU members. For these countries, which are marked below, the list's contents are based on that document.

Since this document was published, the UPU has had two changes of membership:

- On 10 October 2010, the Netherlands Antilles, which shared a UPU membership with Aruba, was dissolved. Bonaire, Sint Eustatius and Saba, collectively known as the Caribbean Netherlands, became an integral part of the Netherlands. Curaçao and Sint Maarten became constituent countries within the Kingdom of the Netherlands. This UPU entity, formerly "Netherlands Antilles and Aruba", is now known as "Aruba, Curaçao and Sint Maarten".
- South Sudan joined the UPU on 4 October 2011.

Country	Governmental authority	Regulatory authority	Designated operator
Afghanistan^{[2009]}	Ministry of Communications and Information Technologies	None	Afghanistan Postal Service
Albania			Posta Shqiptare
Algeria	Ministry of Post and Telecommunications		Algérie Poste
Angola^{[2009]}	Ministry of Telecommunications and Information Technologies	Instituto Angolano das Comunicações (INACOM)	Empresa Nacional de Correios e Telégrafos de Angola (ENCTA)
Antigua and Barbuda			Antigua Post Office
Argentina^{[2009]}	Ministry of Federal Planning, Public Investment and Services (MinPlan)	Communications Secretariat (SeCom) of MinPlan	Correo Oficial de la República Argentina (CORASA)
Armenia^{[2009]}	Ministry of Transport and Communication, State Estate Managing Department	Public Services Regulatory Commission	"Haypost" CJSC
Aruba (Note: now called Aruba, Curaçao and Sint Maarten)			Post Aruba
Australia^{[2009]}	Department of Infrastructure, Transport, Regional Development, Communications, Sport and the Arts	Department of Infrastructure, Transport, Regional Development, Communications, Sport and the Arts, Australian Competition & Consumer Commission, Australia Post	Australia Post
Austria^{[2009]}	Ministry for Transport, Innovation and Technology	RTR GmbH	Österreichische Post
Azerbaijan^{[2009]}	Ministry of Communications and Information Technology	None	"Azərpoçt" State Enterprise
Bahamas^{[2009]}	Ministry of Public Works and Transport	None	Bahamas Postal Service
Bahrain^{[2009]}	Ministry of Transport	None	Bahrain Post
Bangladesh	Ministry of Post and Telecommunication		Bangladesh Post Office
Barbados^{[2009]}	Ministry of Home Affairs	None	Barbados Postal Service
Belarus^{[2009]}	Ministry of Communications and Informatization	None	Republican Unitary Enterprise "Belpochta"
Belgium^{[2009]}	Ministry of Enterprise and Simplification	Belgian Institute of Postal Services and Telecommunications (IBPT)	Belgian Post Group (formerly La Poste)
Belize	Ministry of Public Utilities, Transport, Communications		Belize Postal Service (Note: Presumably the country's principal or only postal operator; not listed as designated postal operator on the UPU website.)
Benin^{[2009]}	Ministry of Information Technology and Communication	Transitional Regulatory Authority	"La Poste du Bénin S.A." (Benin Post)
Bhutan^{[2009]}	Ministry of Information and Communications (MoIC)	Bhutan Information, Communication and Media Authority (BICMA)	Bhutan Postal Corporation
Bolivia^{[2009]}	Ministerio de Servicios, Obras Publicas y Vivenda	None	Agencia Boliviana de Correos (ABC)
Bosnia and Herzegovina^{[2009]}	Ministry of Communications and Transport	Bosnia and Herzegovina Agency for Postal Traffic	BH Pošta; Pošte Srpske; Hrvatska Pošta Mostar
Botswana^{[2009]}	Ministry of Communications, Science and Technology	None	BotswanaPost
Brazil^{[2009]}	Ministry of Communications	None	Empresa Brasileira de Correios e Telégrafos (ECT)
Brunei^{[2009]}	Ministry of Communications	None	Brunei Postal Services Department
Bulgaria^{[2009]}	State Agency for Information Technologies and Communications	Communications Regulation Commission (CRC)	Bulgarian Posts
Burkina Faso^{[2009]}	Ministry of Posts, Information Technology and Communication	None	La Poste BF
Burma			Myanma Posts and Telecommunications
Burundi^{[2009]}	Ministry of Transport, Posts and Telecommunications	None	Régie nationale des postes (R.N.P. – National Postal Authority)
Cambodia^{[2009]}	Ministry of Posts and Telecommunications (MPTC)	None	Directorate of Posts (Cambodian Post)
Cameroon^{[2009]}	Ministry of Posts and Telecommunications	None	Cameroon Postal Services (CAMPOST)
Canada^{[2009]}	Public Services and Procurement Canada	None	Canada Post Corporation (CPC)
Cape Verde^{[2009]}	Ministry of Infrastructure and Transport	National Communications Agency (ANAC)	Correios de Cabo Verde, SARL (CCV)
Central African Republic^{[2009]}	Ministry of Posts, Telecommunications and New Technologies	None	National Posts and Savings Corporation (ONPE)
Chad^{[2009]}	Ministry of posts and information and communication technologies	None (the regulatory function is assigned to STPE)	Chad Posts and Savings Company (STPE)
Chile^{[2009]}	Ministry of Transport and Telecommunications, Under-Secretariat for Telecommunications	None	Empresa de Correos de Chile
China^{[2009]}	Ministry of Transport	State Post Bureau	China Post Group; Hong Kong: Hongkong Post; Macao: Correios de Macau
Colombia^{[2009]}	Ministry of Information Technologies and Communications	Regulatory Commission of Communications (CRC) and Superintendency of Industry and Commerce (SIC)	Servicios Postales Nacionales (4–72)
Comoros			Société Nationale des Postes et Services Financiers
Republic of the Congo^{[2009]}	Ministry of Posts and Telecommunications	Directorate General of the Central Posts and Telecommunications Administration	Congo Posts and Savings Company (SOPECO)
Costa Rica^{[2009]}	None	Autoridad Reguladora de Servicios Públicos (ARESEP)	Correos de Costa Rica
Croatia^{[2009]}	Ministry of the Sea, Tourism, Transport and Development	Postal Services Council	HP-Hrvatska pošta d.d
Cuba^{[2009]}	Ministry of Informatics and Communications	None	Empresa de Correos de Cuba
Curaçao			Cpost International
Cyprus^{[2009]}	Ministry of Communications and Public Works	Commissioner of Telecommunications and Postal Regulation	Department of Postal Services
Czech Republic^{[2009]}	Ministry of Industry and Trade	Czech Telecommunications Office (CTO), Ministry of Finance	Czech Post
Democratic Republic of the Congo^{[2009]}	Ministry of Posts, Telephones and Telecommunications	Autorité de régulation des postes et télécommunications du Congo (ARPTC)	Congolese Posts and Telecommunications Corporation (OCPT)
Denmark^{[2009]}	Ministry of Transport	Faerdselsstyrelsen (Postal Supervisory Department)	PostNord Faroe Islands: Posta; Greenland: Tusass A/S; Other operators: Bring Citymail
Djibouti			Djibouti Post
Dominica	Ministry of Public Works, Energy and Ports		General Post Office (GPO)
Dominican Republic^{[2009]}	Ministry of Public Works and Communications	None	Instituto Postal Dominicano (INPOSDOM; Dominican Postal Institute)
East Timor	Government of Timor-Leste		Correios De Timor-Leste
Ecuador^{[2009]}	Office of the Vice-President of the Republic of Ecuador	Agencia Nacional Postal (National Postal Agency)	Correos del Ecuador
Egypt^{[2009]}	Ministry of Communications and Information Technologies	None	National Postal Authority (Egypt Post)
El Salvador^{[2009]}	Ministry of Gobernacíon	None	General Postal Directorate
Equatorial Guinea			Ente autónomo de Guinea Ecuatorial de Correos y Telecomunicaciones (GECOTEL)
Eritrea^{[2009]}	Ministry of Transport and Communication	Eritrean Communications Department	Eritrean Postal Service (EPS)
Estonia^{[2009]}	Ministry of Economic Affairs and Communications (MEAC)	Estonian National Communications Board	Omniva
Eswatini			Eswatini Posts and Telecommunications
Ethiopia^{[2009]}	Ministry of Transport and Communications	None	Ethiopian Postal Service
Fiji			Post Fiji
Finland^{[2009]}	Ministry of Transport and Communications	Finnish Communications Regulatory Authority (FICORA); Åland: Åland Government/Unit of Administration	Posti Group Corporation; Åland: Åland Post
France^{[2009]}	Ministry of the Economy and Finance (France)	Electronic Communications, Postal and Print Media Distribution Regulation Authority (ARCEP)	La Poste
Gabon^{[2009]}	Ministry of Communication, Post, Telecommunications and New Information Technologies	Postal Regulatory Agency	La Poste
Gambia^{[2009]}	Ministry of Communication, Information and Technology	None	Gambia Postal Services Corporation
Georgia			Georgian Post
Germany^{[2009]}	Federal Ministry of Economics and Technology	Federal Network Agency (Regulatory Authority for Telecommunications and Post)	Several operators. Deutsche Post has the largest market share.
Ghana^{[2009]}	Ministry of Communications	Postal and Courier Services Regulatory Commission	Ghana Post Company Limited
Greece^{[2009]}	Ministry of Transport and Communications	EETT (National Telecommunications and Post Commission)	Hellenic Post (ELTA S.A.)
Grenada			Grenada Postal Corporation
Guatemala			El Correo (Correo de Guatemala)
Guinea^{[2009]}	Ministry of Communication and New Information Technologies (MCNTI)	Posts and Telecommunications Regulatory Authority (ARPT)	Office de la poste guinéenne (OPG) (Guinean Post Office)
Guinea-Bissau			Correios da Guiné-Bissau
Guyana			Guyana Post Office Corporation
Haiti			Office des Postes d'Haiti
Honduras			Honducor
Hungary			Magyar Posta
Iceland	Ministry of the Interior	Post and Telecom Administration	Íslandspóstur
India	Ministry of Communications and Information Technology	Department of Posts	India Post
Indonesia	Ministry of Communication and Information Technology		Pos Indonesia
Iran			IRI Post
Iraq			Iraqi Telecommunications and Post Company
Ireland	Minister for Transport, Tourism and Sport	Commission for Communications Regulation	An Post
Israel			Israel Post
Italy	Ministry of Economic Development	Agenzia nazionale di regolamentazione del settore postale	Poste Italiane
Ivory Coast^{[2009]}	Ministry of New Information Technology and Telecommunications	None	La Poste
Jamaica			Postal Corporation of Jamaica
Japan	Ministry of Internal Affairs and Communications	Postal Services Policy Department (Subdivision of Information and Communications Bureau)	Japan Post Holdings
Jordan			Jordan Post Company
Kazakhstan	Ministry of Investment and Development	Committee for Communication, Informatisation and Information	Kazpost
Kenya	Ministry of Information and Communications Technology	Communications Authority of Kenya	Postal Corporation of Kenya
Kiribati			Kiribati Public Service Public
Kuwait			Ministry of Communications (Kuwait)
Kyrgyzstan	Ministry of Transport and Communications of the Republic of Kyrgyzstan	State Communication Agency	Kyrgyz Express Post "Kyrgyz Pochtasy" SE
Laos			
Latvia			Latvijas Pasts
Lebanon			LibanPost
Lesotho			Lesotho Post
Liberia			Ministry of Posts and Telecommunications (Liberia)
Libya			General Posts and Telecommunications Company
Liechtenstein			Liechtensteinische Post
Lithuania			Lietuvos paštas
Luxembourg			Post Luxembourg
Madagascar			Paositra Malagasy
Malawi			Malawi Posts Corporation
Malaysia	Ministry of Communications and Multimedia Malaysia	Malaysian Communications and Multimedia Commission	Pos Malaysia
Maldives			Maldives Post
Mali			Office national des postes du Mali
Malta	Ministry of Infrastructure, Transport and Communications	Malta Communications Authority	MaltaPost
Mauritania			La Société Mauritanienne des Postes
Mauritius			Mauritius Post
Mexico	Secretaría de Comunicaciones y Transportes		Correos de México
Moldova^{[2009]}	Ministry of Information Development		Poșta Moldovei
Monaco			La Poste Monaco
Mongolia			Mongol Post
Montenegro			Pošta Crne Gore
Morocco			Poste Maroc
Mozambique			Correios de Moçambique
Namibia			NamPost
Nauru	Nauru General Post Office - Department of Chief Secretary		
Nepal			Nepal Post
Netherlands	Ministry of Economic Affairs	OPTA/Authority for Consumers & Markets (ACM)	PostNL
Caribbean Netherlands (Note: Islands Bonaire, Sint Eustatius and Saba)			FXDC Post
New Zealand (Note: including the Ross Dependency)			NZ Post
Nicaragua			Correos de Nicaragua
Niger			Niger Poste
Nigeria			Nigerian Postal Service
North Korea	Ministry of Posts and Telecommunications		Korea Post and Telecommunications Corporation (KPTC)
North Macedonia			North Macedonia Post
Norway	Ministry of Transport	Norwegian Communications Authority	Posten Bring (temporary concession)
Oman			Oman Post
Pakistan			Pakistan Post
Panama			Correos Panamá
Papua New Guinea			Post PNG
Paraguay			Correo Nacional Paraguayo
Peru			Serpost
Philippines^{[2009]}			Philippine Postal Corporation (PHLPost)
Poland	Ministry of State Assets (Poland) (pol. Ministerstwo Aktywów Państwowych) Departament Nadzoru I	Office of Electronic Communications	Poczta Polska
Portugal^{[2009]}		ANACOM	CTT Correios de Portugal, S.A.
Qatar			Qatar Post
Romania^{[2009]}	Ministry of Communications and Information Society	National Regulatory Authority for Communications (Authoritatea Nationala de Reglementare în Comunicatii) - ANCOM	Poșta Română
Russia	Ministry of Digital Development, Communications and Mass Media of the Russian Federation		Russian Post
Rwanda			National Post Office
Saint Kitts and Nevis			St. Kitts & Nevis Postal Services
Saint Lucia			Saint Lucia Postal Service
Saint Vincent and the Grenadines			SVG Postal Corporation
Samoa			Samoa Post
San Marino			Poste sammarinesi
Sao Tome and Principe			Correios de São Tomé e Príncipe
Saudi Arabia			Saudi Post
Senegal			La Poste Senegal
Serbia	Ministry of Foreign and Internal Trade and Telecommunications	Republic agency for Postal Services (RAPUS)	Pošta Srbije
Seychelles			Seychelles Postal Service
Sierra Leone			SALPOST
Singapore	Ministry of Communications and Information	Infocomm Media Development Authority	Singapore Post
Sint Maarten			Postal Services St. Maarten
Slovakia			Slovenská pošta
Slovenia			Pošta Slovenije
Solomon Islands			Solomon Post
Somalia	Minister of Information, Posts and Telecommunications		Somali Postal Service
South Africa			South African Post Office
South Korea	Ministry of Science and ICT		Korea Post
South Sudan	Minister of Telecommunication and Postal Services		
Spain		Sociedad Estatal de Participaciones Industriales	Correos
Sri Lanka	Ministry of Posts, Postal Services & Muslim Religious Affairs	Department of Post	Sri Lanka Post
Sudan			
Suriname			Surpost
Sweden	Ministry of Enterprise	Swedish Post and Telecom Authority	PostNord Sverige; Other operators: Over 30 other licensed operators as of 2014
Switzerland	Federal Department of the Environment, Transport, Energy, and Communications (DETEC)	Federal Postal Services Commission	Swiss Post
Syria	Ministry of Transport		Syrian Post
Tajikistan			Tajik Post (Почтаи тоҷик)
Tanzania		Tanzania Communications Regulatory Authority	Tanzania Posts Corporation
Thailand	Ministry of Digital Economy and Society	None	Thailand Post
Togo			La Poste du Togo
Tonga (Note: including Niuafo'ou)			Tonga Post
Trinidad and Tobago			TTPost
Tunisia			La Poste Tunisienne
Turkey	Ministry of Transport and Infrastructure		PTT
Turkmenistan			Turkmenpochta
Tuvalu			
Uganda		Uganda Communications Commission	Posta Uganda
Ukraine			Ukrposhta
United Arab Emirates			Emirates Post
United Kingdom^{[2009]}	Department for Business and Trade	Ofcom; British Overseas Territories and Crown Dependencies have separate operators and regulatory arrangements.	Royal Mail; Other operators:British Forces Post Office; 55 other licensed operators as of 2011
British Overseas Territories and Crown Dependencies			Anguilla Post Office; Bermuda Post Office; BIOT Post Office, (outbound; inbound is United States Postal Service and British Forces Post Office); British Antarctic Territory Government via Falkland Islands or British Forces; BVI Post; Cayman Islands Postal Service; Falklands Post Service Limited; Guernsey Post; Isle of Man Post Office; Jersey Post; Montserrat General Post Office; Pitcairn Post Office; Royal Gibraltar Post Office; Turks and Caicos Post Office; Saint Helena, Ascension and Tristan da Cunha: Ascension Post Office; Saint Helena Post Office; Tristan da Cunha Post Office; South Georgia and the South Sandwich Islands Ministry of Post (transported via Falkland Islands or British Forces); Cyprus Postal Services handles civilian mail for Akrotiri and Dhekelia. British Forces Post Office provides military mail service for UK service members internationally, including to Akrotiri and Dhekelia and other jurisdictions listed above which also have public civilian delivery.
United States	United States Postal Service (Note: The United States Postal Service is a government-owned corporation; its board members are appointed by the President with the advice and consent of the Senate.)	Postal Regulatory Commission	United States Postal Service
Uruguay		Unidad Reguladora de Servicios de Comunicaciones	Correo Uruguayo
Uzbekistan			O‘zbekiston Pochtasi
Vanuatu			Vanuatu Post
Vatican City			Poste Vaticane
Venezuela			IPOSTEL
Vietnam			VNPT
Yemen			Yemen Post
Zambia			ZamPost
Zimbabwe			ZimPost

=== Countries or territories that are not members of the UPU ===
Country or territory	Governmental authority	Regulatory authority	Operator(s)
Kosovo	Post and Telecom of Kosovo		Posta e Kosovës
Palestinian territories	West Bank (PNA): Palestinian Ministry of Telecom & IT; Gaza Strip (Hamas): Ministry of Telecom and Information Technology		West Bank: Palestine Post
Taiwan	Ministry of Transportation and Communications	None	Chunghwa Post

== See also ==
- List of national postal services
- List of members of the Universal Postal Union
- List of entities that have issued postage stamps: A–E / F–L / M–Z
- List of philatelic bureaus
- Articles about postal systems by country, postal organisations by country
- United Nations Postal Administration
