= List of national postal services =

This list of national postal services shows the individual national postal administrations of the world's states.

== Africa ==
| Country | Company | Website | Status |
|---|---|---|---|
| Algeria | Algérie Poste | poste.dz | |
| Angola | Correios de Angola | correiosdeangola.ao | |
| Benin | La Poste du Bénin | laposte.bj | |
| Botswana | BotswanaPost | botswanapost.post botspost.co.bw | |
| Burkina Faso | La Poste Burkina Faso | laposte.bf | |
| Burundi | Régie Nationale des Postes | poste.bi | |
| Cameroon | CAMPOST | campost.cm | |
| Cape Verde | Correios de Cabo Verde | correios.cv | |
| Central African Republic | Société Centrafricaine des Postes | socapost.cf | |
| Chad | Société tchadienne des postes et de l'épargne | laposte.td | |
| Côte d'Ivoire | La Poste (Côte d'Ivoire) | laposte.ci.post laposte.ci | |
| Democratic Republic of the Congo | Congolese Posts and Telecommunications Corporation | ocpt.cd scpt.cd | |
| Egypt | Egypt Post | egyptpost.gov.eg egyptpost.org | |
| Eritrea | Eritrean Postal Service | eripostal.com | |
| Eswatini | Eswatini Posts and Telecommunications | sptc.co.sz | |
| Ethiopia | Ethiopian Postal Service | ethio.post | |
| Gabon | Gabon Poste | laposte.ga ccp.laposte.ga | |
| The Gambia | Gambia Postal Services Corporation | gambiapost.gm | |
| Ghana | Ghana Post | ghanapost.com.gh | |
| Guinea | Office de la poste guinéenne | laposte.gn | |
| Guinea-Bissau | Correios da Guiné-Bissau | | |
| Kenya | Postal Corporation of Kenya | posta.co.ke | |
| Lesotho | Lesotho Post | lesothopost.org.ls | |
| Liberia | Ministry of Posts and Telecommunications (Liberia) | mopt.gov.lr | |
| Libya | General Posts and Telecommunications Company | libyapost.ly | |
| Madagascar | Paositra Malagasy | paositramalagasy.mg | |
| Malawi | Malawi Posts Corporation | malawiposts.co | |
| Mali | Office national des postes du Mali | laposte.ml | |
| Mauritania | La Société Mauritanienne des Postes | mauripost.post | |
| Mauritius | Mauritius Post | mauritiuspost.mu | |
| Morocco | Poste Maroc | poste.ma | |
| Mozambique | Correios de Moçambique | correios.co.mz | |
| Namibia | NamPost | nampost.com.na | |
| Niger | Niger Poste | nigerposte.ne nigerposte.net | |
| Nigeria | Nigerian Postal Service | nipost.gov.ng | |
| Republic of the Congo | Congolese Posts and Savings Company | laposte.cg | |
| Rwanda | National Post Office | i-posita.rw | |
| São Tomé and Príncipe | Correios de São Tomé e Príncipe | correios.st | |
| Senegal | La Poste Senegal | laposte.sn | |
| Seychelles | Seychelles Postal Service | seychelles-post.com | |
| Sierra Leone | SALPOST | salpost.gov.sl | |
| Somalia | Somali Postal Service | posta.so | |
| South Africa | South African Post Office | postoffice.co.za | |
| South Sudan | Minister of Telecommunication and Postal Services | motps.goss.org | |
| Sudan | Sudapost | sudapost.sd | |
| Tanzania | Tanzania Posts Corporation | posta.co.tz | |
| Togo | La Poste du Togo | laposte.tg | |
| Tunisia | La Poste Tunisienne | poste.tn | |
| Uganda | Posta Uganda | ugapost.co.ug | |
| Zambia | ZamPost | zampost.com.zm | |
| Zimbabwe | ZimPost | zimpost.co.zw | |

== The Americas ==
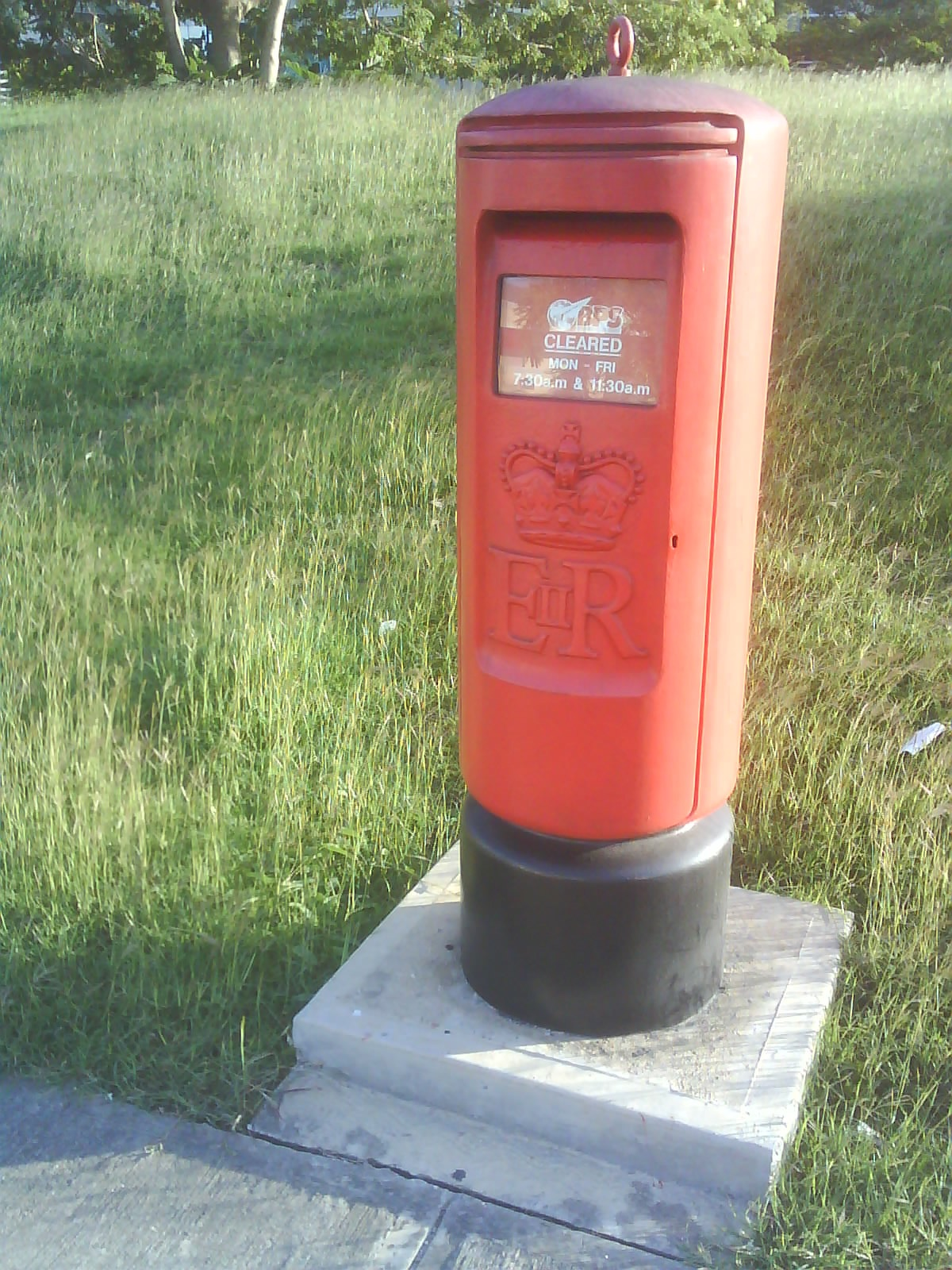
Post office box in Barbados

| Country | Company | Website | Status |
|---|---|---|---|
| Argentina | Correo Argentino | correoargentino.com.ar | State-owned enterprise |
| Aruba (Kingdom of the Netherlands) | Post Aruba | postaruba.com/ | |
| Barbados | Barbados Postal Service | https://bps.gov.bb/ | State-owned enterprise |
| Belize | Belize Postal Service | https://www.belizepostalservice.gov.bz/ | |
| Bolivia | Agencia Boliviana de Correos | correos.gob.bo | |
| Brazil | Correios | correios.com.br | Government agency |
| Canada | Canada Post | canadapost.ca/postescanada.ca | Crown corporation |
| Caribbean Netherlands (Kingdom of the Netherlands) | Flamingo Express Dutch Caribbean | fxdc-post.com | |
| Chile | Correos de Chile | correos.cl | State-owned enterprise |
| Colombia | Servicios Postales Nacionales (4-72) | 4-72.com.co | |
| Costa Rica | Correos de Costa Rica | correos.go.cr | |
| Cuba | Correos de Cuba | correos.cu | |
| Curaçao (Kingdom of the Netherlands) | Cpost International | cpostinternational.com | |
| Dominica | General Post Office | publicworks.gov.dm | |
| Dominican Republic | Dominican Postal Institute | inposdom.gob.do | |
| Ecuador | Correos del Ecuador | https://www.serviciopostal.gob.ec/ | |
| El Salvador | Correos de El Salvador | correos.gob.sv/ | |
| Guatemala | Correos de Guatemala | https://correos.gob.gt/ | |
| Guyana | Guyana Post Office Corporation | guypost.gy/gpoc | |
| Haiti | LaPoste Haiti | laposte.gouv.ht | |
| Honduras | Honducor | honducor.gob.hn | |
| Jamaica | Postal Corporation of Jamaica | jamaicapost.gov.jm/ | |
| Mexico | Correos de México | sepomex.gob.mx | |
| Nicaragua | Correos de Nicaragua | correos.gob.ni | |
| Panama | Correos de Panamá | correospanama.gob.pa | |
| Paraguay | Correo Nacional Paraguayo | correoparaguayo.gov.py | |
| Peru | Serpost | serpost.com.pe | |
| Saint Kitts and Nevis | St. Kitts & Nevis Postal Services | post.kn | |
| Saint Lucia | Saint Lucia Postal Service | stluciapostal.com | |
| Saint Vincent and the Grenadines | SVG Postal Corporation | svgpost.gov.vc | |
| Sint Maarten (Kingdom of the Netherlands) | Postal Services St. Maarten | pssnv.sx | |
| Suriname | Surpost | surpost.com | |
| Trinidad and Tobago | TTPost | ttpost.net | |
| United States | United States Postal Service | usps.com | Independent agency |
| Uruguay | Correo Uruguayo | correo.com.uy | |
| Venezuela | IPOSTEL | ipostel.gob.ve | |

== Asia ==
| Country | Company | Website | Status |
|---|---|---|---|
| Afghanistan | Afghan Post | afghanpost.gov.af | |
| Azerbaijan | Azərpoçt | azerpost.az | |
| Bahrain | Bahrain Post | customs.gov.bh | |
| Bangladesh | Bangladesh Post Office | bangladeshpost.gov.bd | |
| Bhutan | Bhutan Postal Corporation | bhutanpost.bt | |
| Brunei | Brunei Postal Services Department | post.gov.bn | |
| Cambodia | Cambodian Post | cambodiapost.com.kh | |
| China | China Post | chinapost.com.cn | |
| East Timor | Correios De Timor-Leste | correios.gov.tl | |
| Hong Kong | Hongkong Post | hongkongpost.hk | |
| India | India Post | indiapost.gov.in | |
| Indonesia | Pos Indonesia | posindonesia.co.id | |
| Iran | Iran Post | post.ir | |
| Iraq | Iraqi Telecommunications and Post Company | | |
| Israel | Israel Post | israelpost.co.il | |
| Japan | Japan Post Holdings | japanpost.jp | |
| Jordan | Jordan Post Company | jordanpost.com.jo | |
| Kazakhstan | Kazpost | kazpost.kz | |
| Kuwait | Ministry of Communications (Kuwait) | moc.gov.kw | |
| Kyrgyzstan | Kyrgyz Express Post Kyrgyz Post | kep.kg, post.kg | |
| Lebanon | LibanPost | libanpost.com | |
| Macau | Correios de Macau | macaupost.gov.mo | |
| Malaysia | Pos Malaysia | pos.com.my | |
| Maldives | Maldives Post | maldivespost.com | |
| Mongolia | Mongol Post | mongolpost.mn | |
| Myanmar | Myanmar Post and Telecommunications Department | mcpt.gov.mm/ptd/ | |
| Nepal | Nepal Post | nepalpost.gov.np | |
| North Korea | Korea Post and Telecommunications Corporation | post.com.kp | |
| Oman | Oman Post | omanpost.om | |
| Pakistan | Pakistan Post | pakpost.gov.pk | |
| Palestine | Palestine Post | palpost.ps | |
| Philippines | PHLPost | philpost.gov.ph | |
| Qatar | Qatar Post | qatarpost.qa | |
| Saudi Arabia | Saudi Post | splonline.com.sa | |
| Singapore | Singapore Post | singpost.com.sg | |
| South Korea | Korea Post | koreapost.go.kr | |
| Sri Lanka | Sri Lanka Post | slpost.gov.lk | |
| Syria | Syria Post | syrianpost.gov.sy | |
| Taiwan | Chunghwa Post | post.gov.tw | |
| Thailand | Thailand Post | thailandpost.co.th | |
| Timor-Leste | Correios de Timor-Leste | correios.gov.tl | |
| Turkmenistan | Turkmenpochta | turkmenpost.gov.tm | |
| United Arab Emirates | Emirates Post | emiratespost.ae | |
| Uzbekistan | O′zbekiston Pochtasi | uz.post | |
| Vietnam | Vietnam Post Corporation | vnpost.vn | |
| Yemen | Yemen Post | post.ye | |

== Europe ==
| Country | Company | Website | Status |
|---|---|---|---|
| Åland (Finland) | Åland Post | alandpost.ax/ | |
| Albania | Posta Shqiptare | postashqiptare.al | |
| Andorra (Note: Andorra does not have its own postal system. Instead they use both the Spanish based Correos and the French based La Poste as their national postal services. Both services operate alongside each other.) | Correos | correos.es | |
| Andorra | La Poste | laposte.fr | |
| Armenia | HayPost | haypost.am | |
| Austria | Austrian Post | post.at | |
| Belarus | Belposhta | belpost.by | |
| Belgium | Bpost | bpost.be | |
| Bosnia and Herzegovina | BH Pošta | posta.ba | |
| Bosnia and Herzegovina | Hrvatska Pošta Mostar | post.ba | |
| Bosnia and Herzegovina | Pošte Srpske | postesrpske.com | |
| Bulgaria | Bulgarian Posts | bgpost.bg | |
| Croatia | Hrvatska pošta | posta.hr | |
| Cyprus | Cyprus Postal Services | cypruspost.post | |
| Czech Republic | Česká pošta | cpost.cz | |
| Denmark | Dansk Avis Omdeling | dao.as | Aktieselskab |
| Estonia | Omniva | omniva.ee | |
| Faroe Islands (Kingdom of Denmark) | Posta (company) | posta.fo | |
| Finland | Posti | posti.fi | |
| France | La Poste | laposte.fr | |
| Georgia | Georgian Post | georgianpost.ge | |
| Germany | Deutsche Post | deutschepost.de | Aktiengesellschaft |
| Gibraltar (UK) | Royal Gibraltar Post Office | gibraltar.gov.gi/postal-a-philatelic | |
| Greece | Hellenic Post | elta.gr | |
| Greenland (Kingdom of Denmark) | Post Greenland | post.gl/ | |
| Guernsey (UK) | Guernsey Post | guernseypost.com | |
| Hungary | Magyar Posta | posta.hu | |
| Iceland | Íslandspóstur | postur.is | |
| Ireland | An Post | anpost.ie | |
| Isle of Man | Isle of Man Post Office | gov.im/post | |
| Italy | Poste italiane | poste.it | |
| Jersey (UK) | Jersey Post | jerseypost.com | |
| Kosovo | Posta e Kosovës | postakosoves.com | |
| Latvia | Latvijas Pasts | pasts.lv/ | |
| Liechtenstein | Liechtensteinische Post | post.li | |
| Lithuania | Lietuvos paštas | post.lt | |
| Luxembourg | Post Luxembourg | post.lu | |
| Malta | MaltaPost | maltapost.com | |
| Moldova | Poșta Moldovei | posta.md | |
| Monaco | La Poste Monaco | lapostemonaco.mc | |
| Montenegro | Pošta Crne Gore | postacg.me | |
| Netherlands (Kingdom of the Netherlands) | PostNL | postnl.nl | |
| North Macedonia | North Macedonia Post | posta.com.mk | |
| Norway | Posten | posten.no | |
| Poland | Poczta Polska | poczta-polska.pl | Spółka Akcyjna |
| Portugal | Correios de Portugal | ctt.pt | |
| Romania | Poșta Română | posta-romana.ro | |
| Russia | Russian Post | pochta.ru | |
| San Marino | Poste San Marino | poste.sm/ | |
| Serbia | Pošta Srbije | posta.rs | |
| Slovakia | Slovenská pošta | posta.sk | |
| Slovenia | Pošta Slovenije | posta.si | |
| Spain | Correos | correos.es | |
| Sweden | PostNord | postnord.se | |
| Switzerland | Swiss Post | post.ch/poste.ch/posta.ch | |
| Turkey | PTT (Turkey) | ptt.gov.tr | |
| United Kingdom | Royal Mail | royalmail.com.uk | Privatized in 2013 subsidiary GLS for some EU deliveries (inc. signed-for tracking) |
| Ukraine | Ukrposhta | ukrposhta.com.ua | |
| Vatican City | Poste Vaticane | vaticanstate.val | |

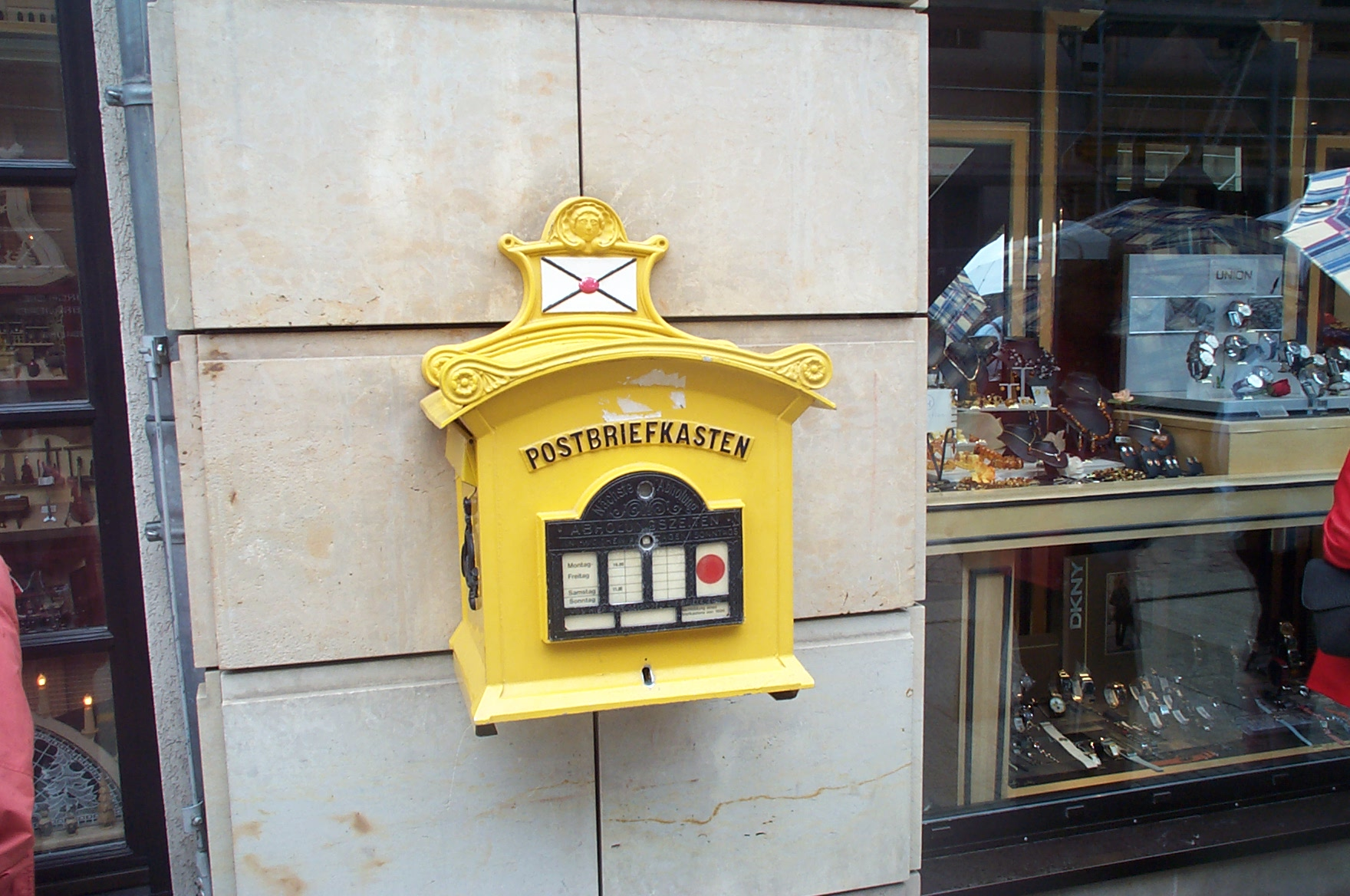
A German old-style-replica Postbriefkasten in use in Dresden

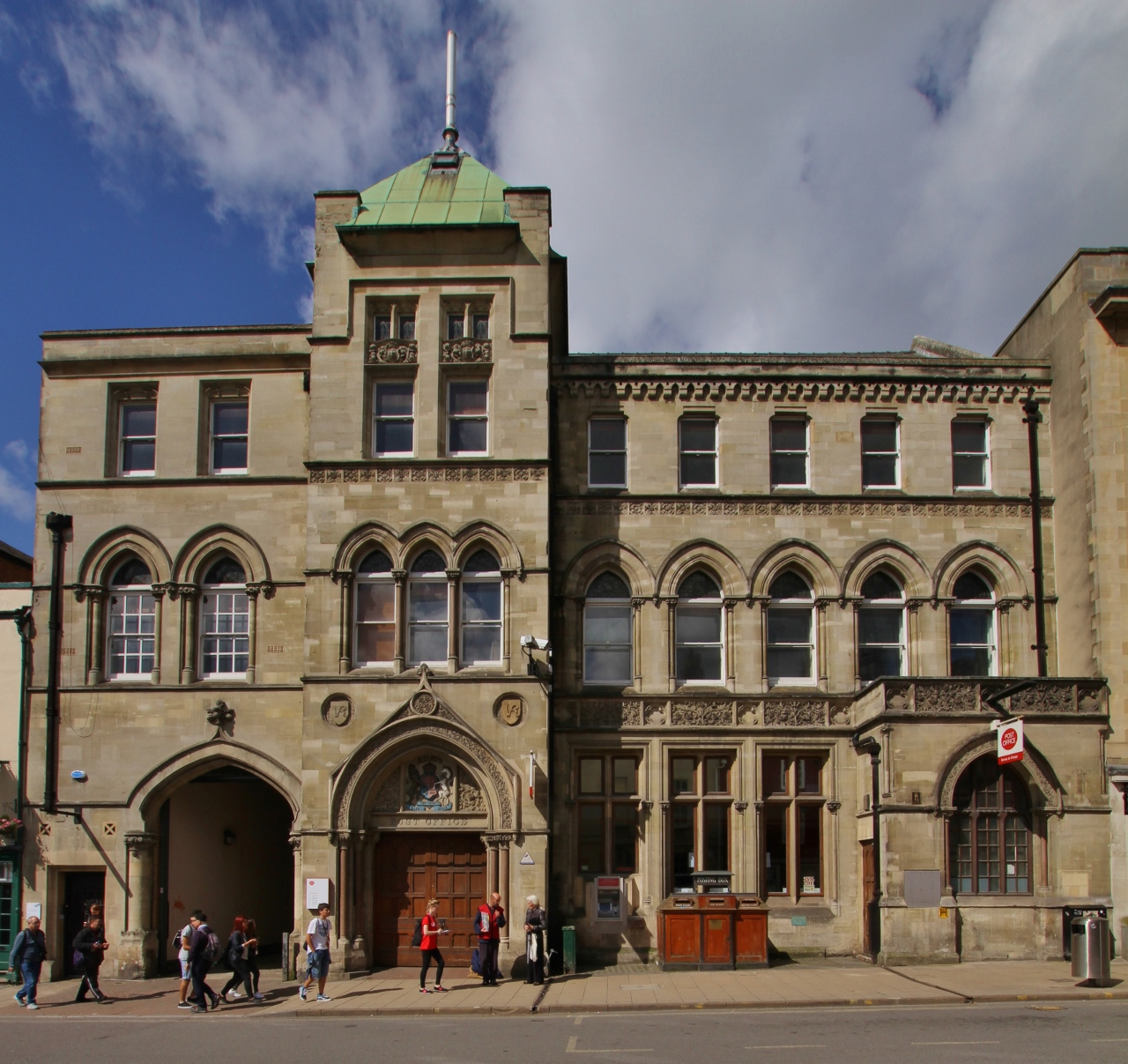
Oxford main post office, England

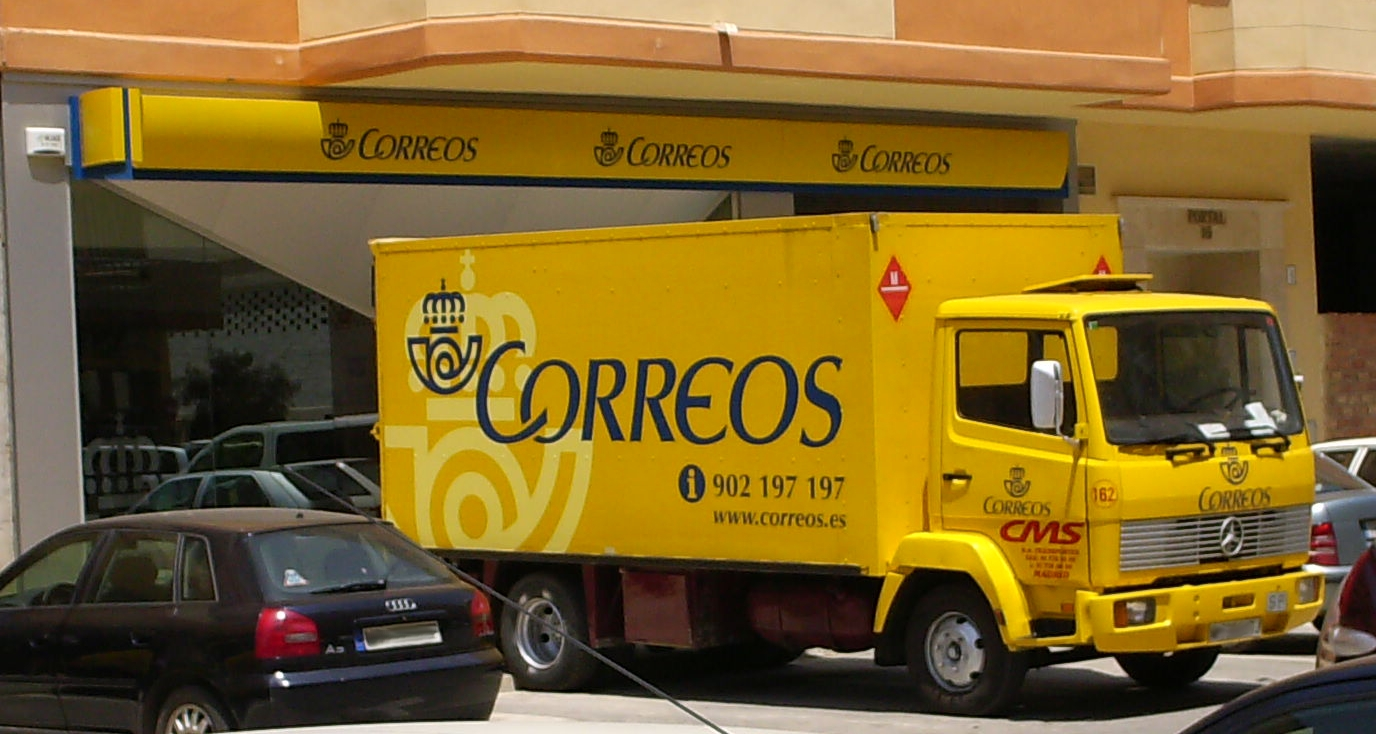
Spanish post truck and office, Spain

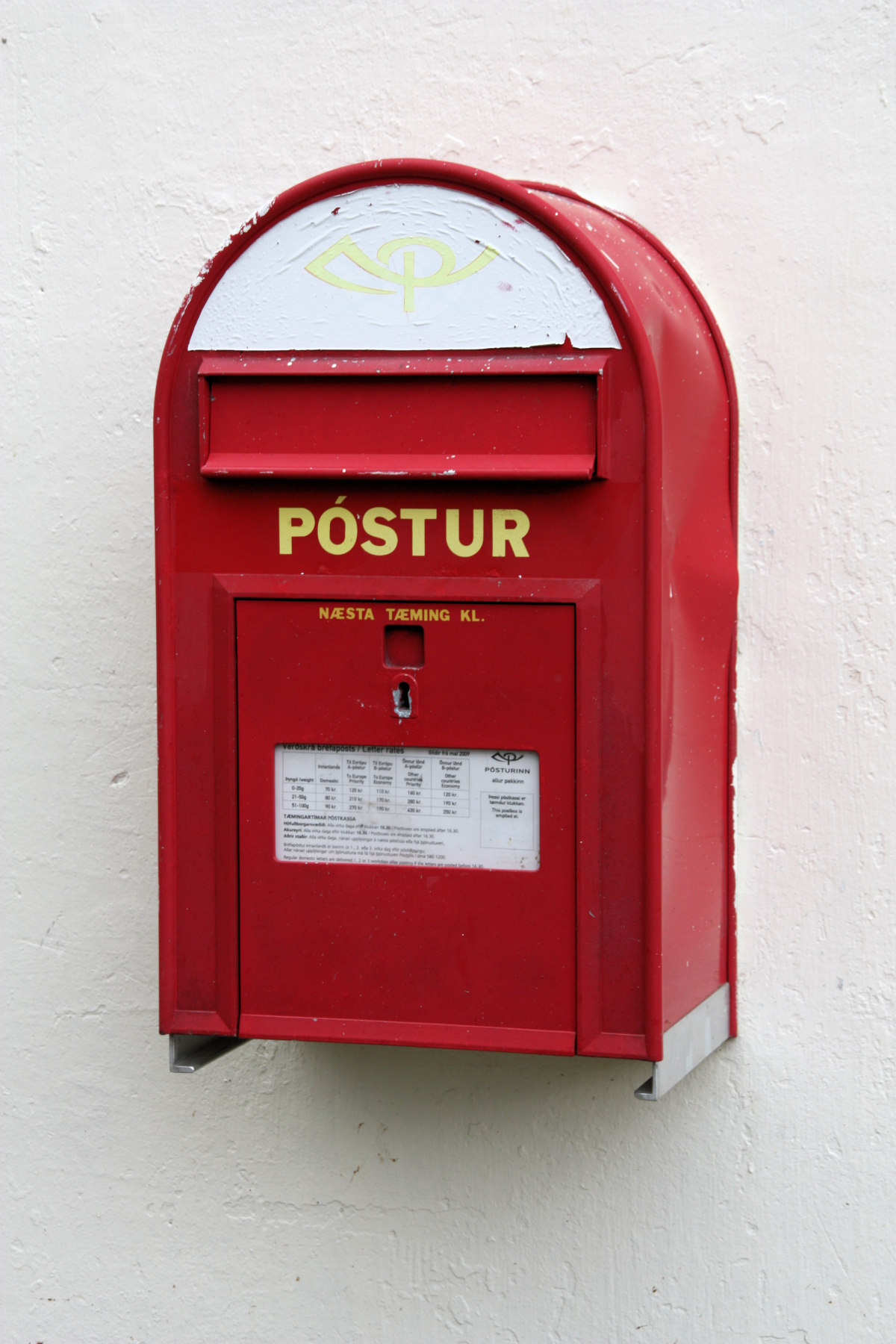
Post box of Íslandspóstur in Iceland

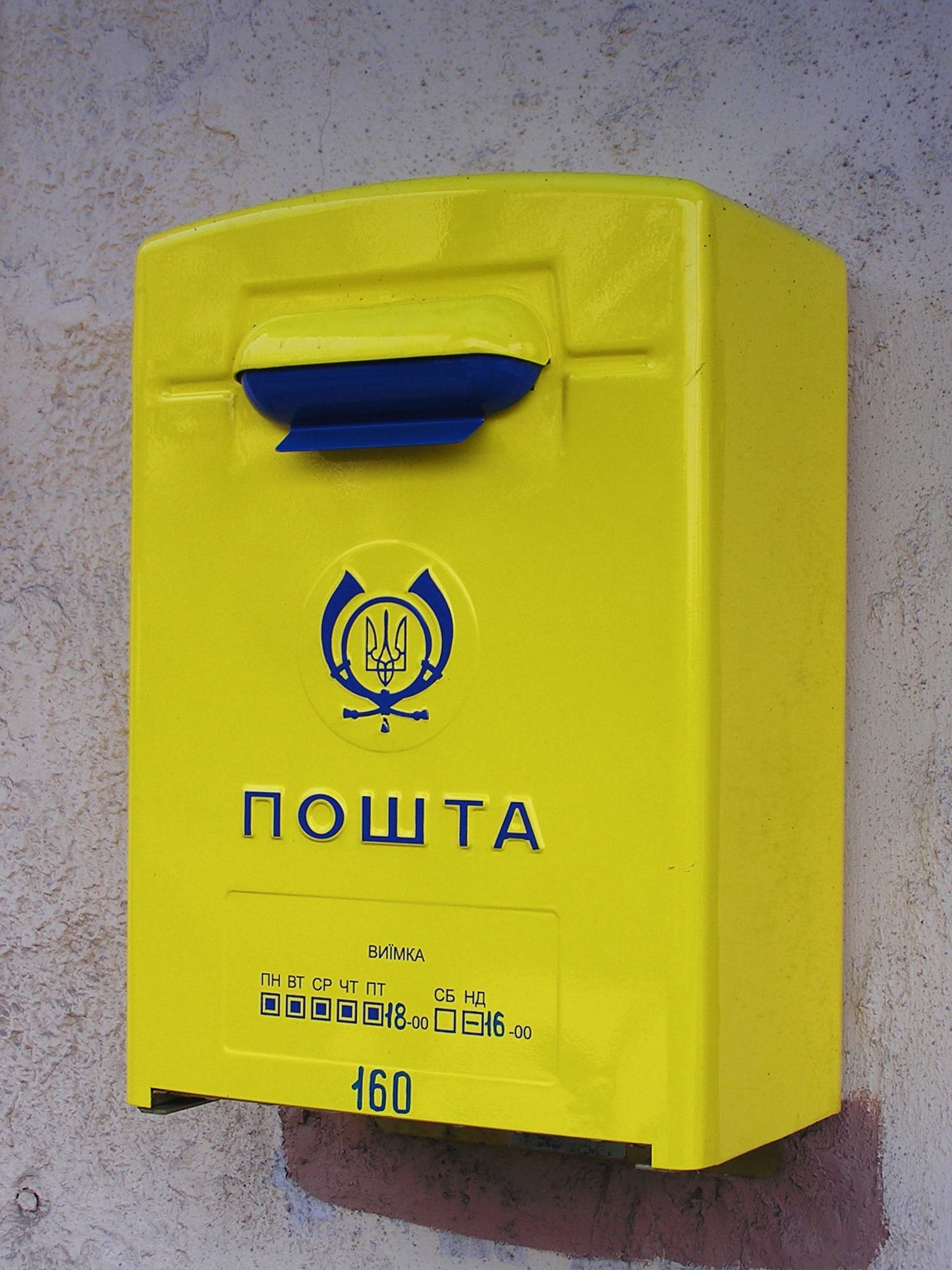
Post box of Ukrposhta, Ukraine

== Oceania ==
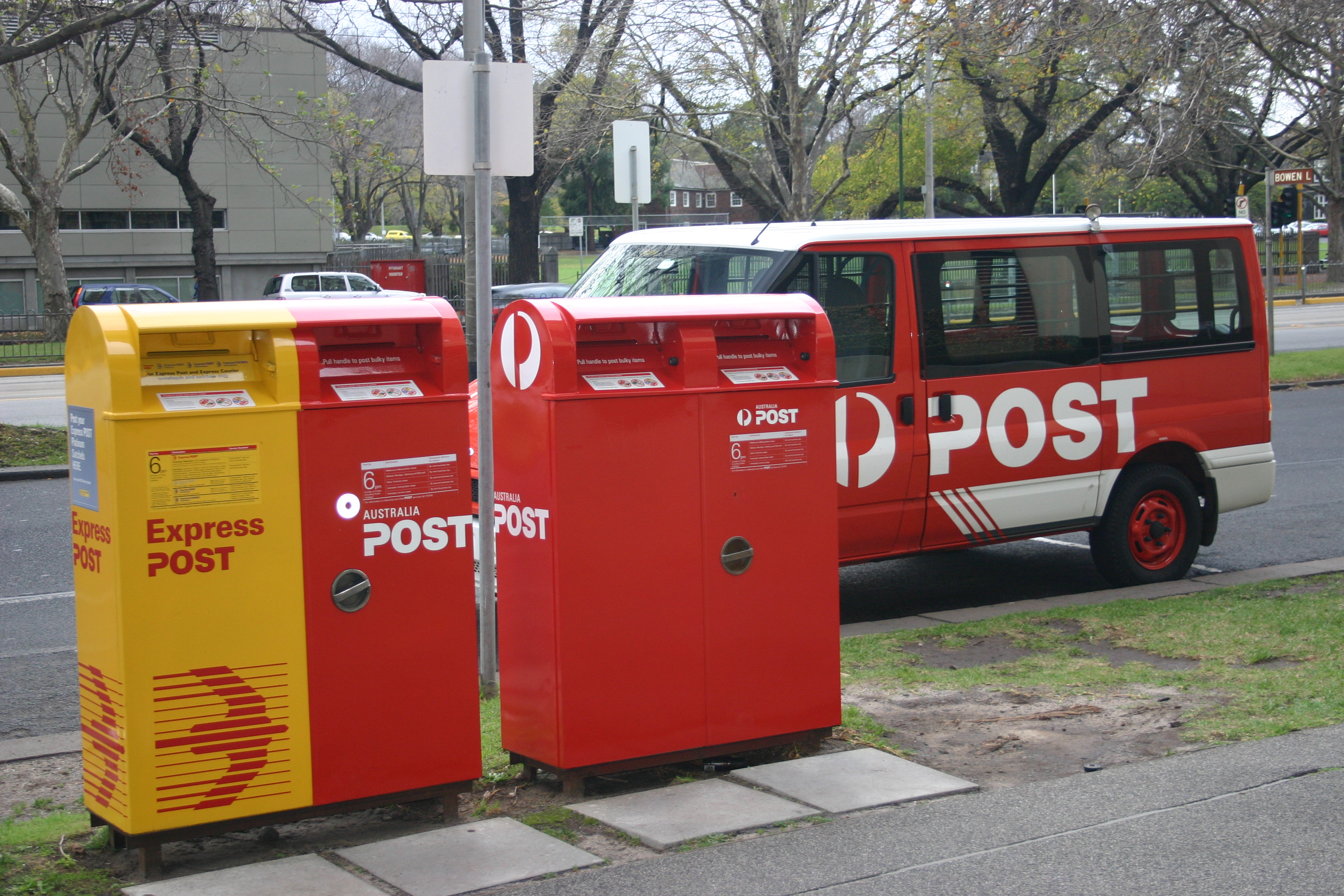
Australian express (yellow) and normal (red) street posting boxes

| Country | Company | Website | Status |
|---|---|---|---|
| Australia | Australia Post | auspost.com.au | Government business enterprise |
| Cook Islands (New Zealand) | Cook Islands Post | telecom.co.ck | |
| Federated States of Micronesia | Federated States of Micronesia Postal Service | post.gov.fm | |
| Fiji | Post Fiji | postfiji.com.fj | |
| Kiribati | Kiribati Public Service Public | pso.gov.ki | |
| Marshall Islands | Marshall Islands Post Office | | |
| Nauru | Nauru General Post Office | naurugov.nr | |
| New Zealand | New Zealand Post | nzpost.co.nz | State-owned enterprise |
| Palau | Palau Post | palaupost.pw | |
| Papua New Guinea | Post PNG | postpng.com.pg | |
| Pitcairn Islands (UK) | Pitcairn Islands General Post Office | | |
| Samoa | Samoa Post | samoapost.ws | |
| Solomon Islands | Solomon Post | solomonpost.com.sb | |
| Tonga | Tonga Post | tongapost.to | |
| Tuvalu | Tuvalu Post | tuvalupost.tv | |
| Vanuatu | Vanuatu Post | vanuatupost.vu | |

== See also ==
- List of postal entities
