= Muisca raft =

Pre-Columbian votive piece

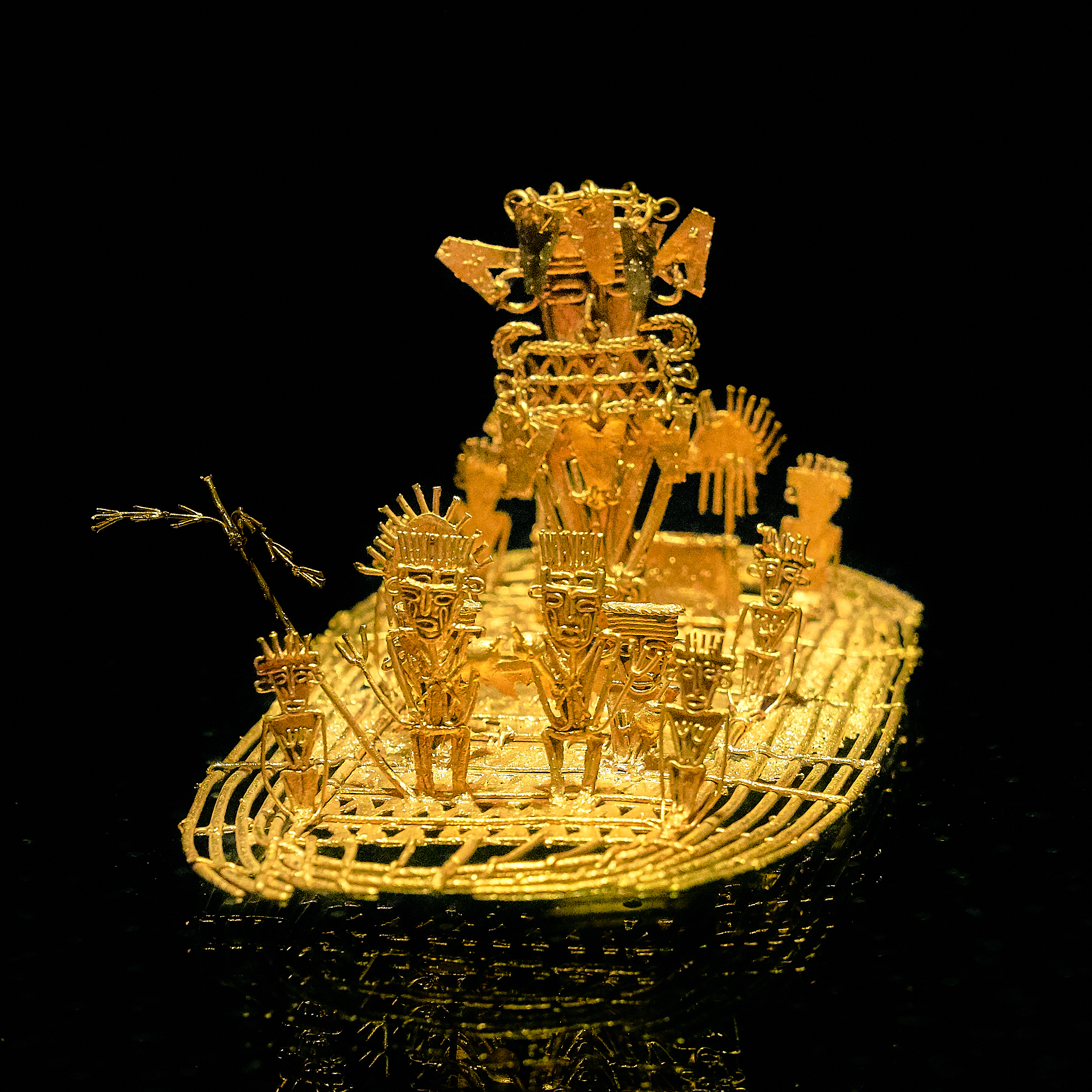
- The Muisca raft
- Material: Gold, silver and copper
- Size: 19.5 cm (7.7 in) × 10.2 cm (4.0 in) × 10.1 cm (4.0 in)
- Created: 1295–1410
- Discovered: 1969 in Pasca
- Present location: Gold Museum, Bogotá, Colombia

The Muisca raft (Balsa Muisca in Spanish), sometimes referred to as the Golden Raft of El Dorado or the Pasca raft, is a pre-Columbian votive piece created by the Muisca, an Andean people of Colombia in the Eastern Ranges of the Colombian Andes that established multiple chiefdoms in the region. The raft was a propitiatory offering made within the historical context of the emerging Muisca chiefdom of Pasca. According to some scholars, the piece probably refers to the gold offering ceremony described in the legend of El Dorado, which occasionally took place at Lake Guatavita. In this ritual, the new chief (zipa), who was aboard a raft and covered with gold dust, tossed gold objects into the lake as offerings to the gods, before immersing himself into the lake. However, other anthropologists and historians consider the raft to not refer specifically to the Guatavita ceremony, as other, similar ceremonies were documented across Muisca territory. The figure was created between 1295 and 1410 AD by lost-wax casting in an alloy of gold with silver and copper. The raft was part of an offering that was placed in a cave in the municipality of Pasca. Since its discovery in 1969, the Muisca raft has become a national emblem for Colombia and has been depicted on postage stamps. The piece is exhibited at the Gold Museum in Bogotá.

== Background ==
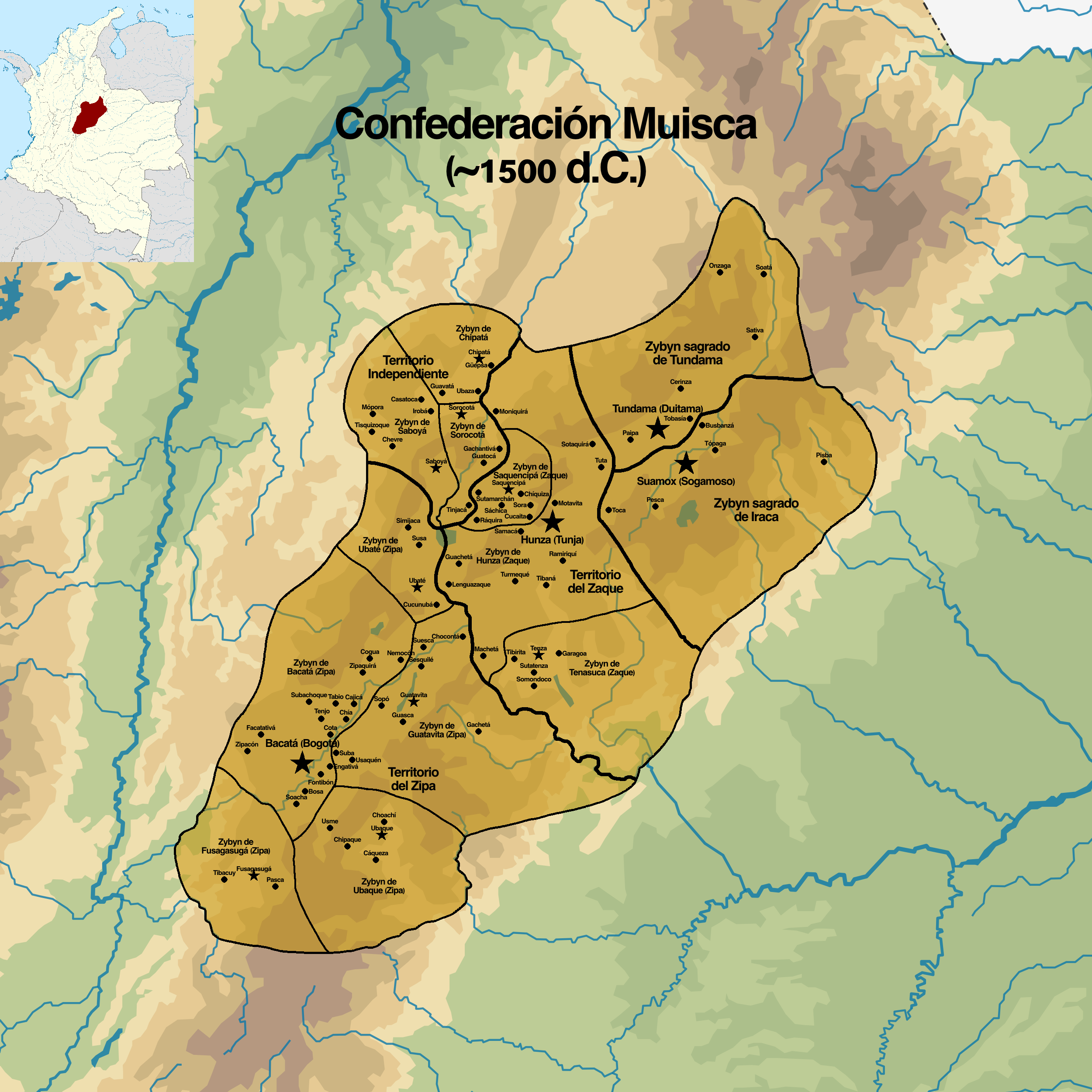
Muisca territory and nearby peoples within modern-day Colombia

=== Muisca people ===
The Muisca people, also known as the Chibcha, were situated at 9000 ft elevation in the eastern Andes of Colombia near modern day Bogotá, the town of Tunja, and Lake Guatavita. While most Muisca villages had a chief and priests, the Muisca were generally an egalitarian agricultural people. They made pottery and textiles and mined emeralds and salt, but they lacked the gold and beeswax needed to create their signature gold pieces. For those raw materials, they bartered with neighboring peoples. Gold was not reduced to the use of the elite or the Muisca chiefs, and was not the principal object of prestige, as it was mainly used for religious offering purposes. Instead, all Muisca families decorated their doors and windows with gold objects.

=== Muisca goldworking ===
Gold was used in Central America by the first centuries AD and was spiritually and symbolically important to Pre-Columbian peoples. The countries of the Isthmus—Costa Rica, Panama, and Colombia—emerged as a single goldworking region that shared styles and methodology, such as the use of lost-wax casting instead of hammering. Metalworking in the region began with objects for religious rituals and royalty, rather than as tools, weapons, or currency; this symbolic use from the outset established a precedent for metalworking throughout the region's history.

Muisca gold pieces are distinct from those of other Pre-Columbian peoples, in terms of their use, manufacture, and appearance. The Muisca votive offerings, called tunjos, were not worn as clothing or jewelry, but instead were used for symbolic purposes. They were often small enough to hold in the hand; sometimes as small as 1.5 cm (0.59 in). The tunjos were lost-wax casts using tumbaga, a gold alloy containing as much as 70% copper, whereas in other regions gold was hammered into the desired shape. Furthermore, the Muisca objects are identifiable by their rough surfaces in comparison to the polished gold in surrounding regions. Muisca art tended to include components that referred back to the raw material used in their own construction; for example, a statue who is depicted to be holding, in pouches, the substance from which it is made. Birds are a common motif in Colombian gold work.

Muisca goldworking influenced a wide region. Local copies of Muisca votive figurines have been found as far away as the Linea Vieja region on the Atlantic slope of Costa Rica. Some of these design traditions remained unchanged for 1,000 years and were prominent at the time of contact.

=== Depicted scene ===
The raft described a scene on a raft, perhaps a ceremony, including a chief and his servants. It was found together with another object which represented a ruler seated on his litter, and was most likely a votive offering commissioned by the chief of Pasca. Traditionally, and notably at the Museo del Oro, it has been interpreted as representing the famous Guatavita ceremony associated with the myth of El Dorado. However, some scholars consider this interpretation to be "euro-centric", as other ceremonies on lakes were documented and the object was not found in association with the Pre-Columbian Guatavita chiefdom.

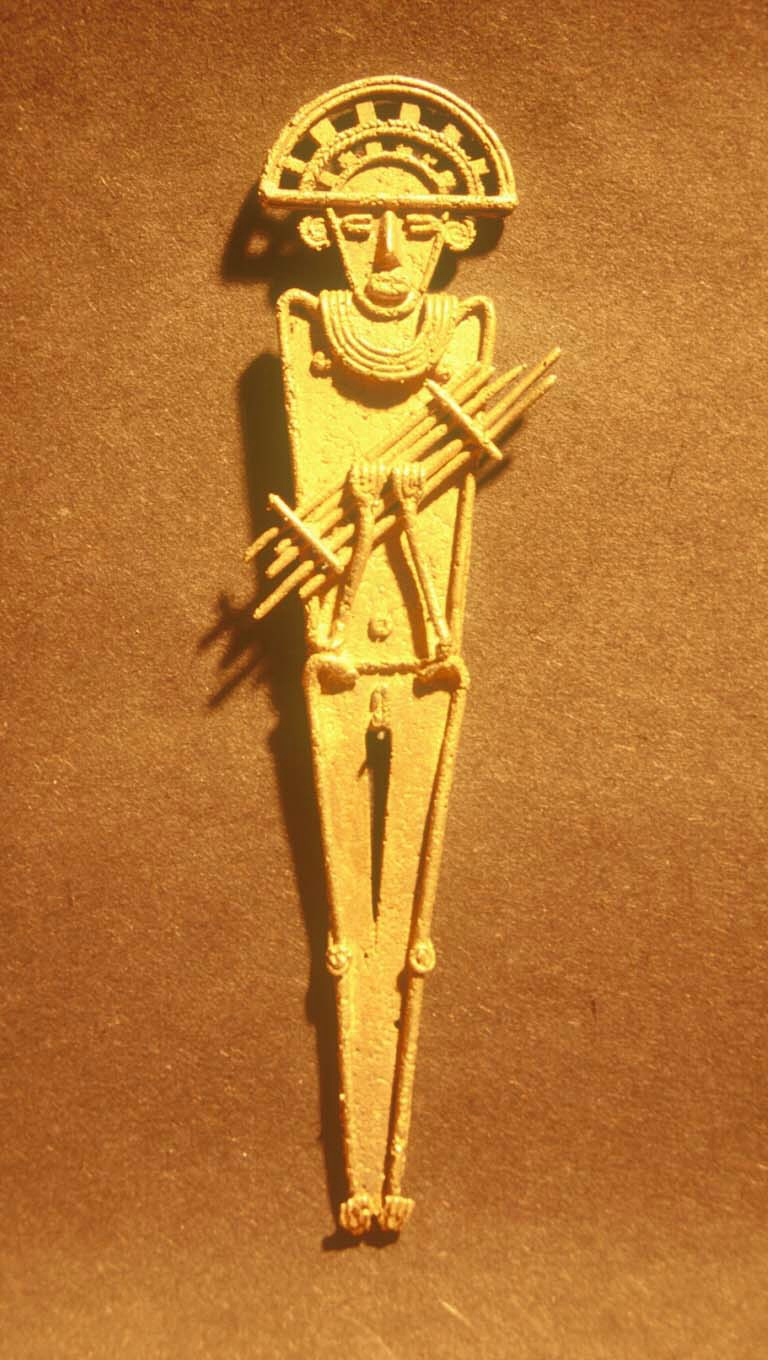
Standing man with miniature raft. Colombian. Walters Art Museum, Baltimore, Maryland.

==== Legend of El Dorado ====
During the Guatavita ceremony, traditionally associated with the raft and detailed in the Legend of El Dorado, a new king covered his entire body in gold dust, floated on a raft to the center of a lake, and threw large quantities of gold votive offerings into the lake. The legend of El Dorado emerged from six accounts, three by the chroniclers Fernandez de Oviedo, Pedro Cieza de Leon, and Juan de Castellanos, and three by the conquistadores Gonzalo Pizarro, Jimenez de Quesada, and Sebastian de Benalcazar; subsequent descriptions are elaborations upon these six accounts. While the story was embellished with each telling, every version had several details in common, such as the lake and the gold dust. It is also known that the Muisca venerated lakes. Jennings details the ceremony as it occurs in one telling:

The El Dorado tale derives from the investiture ceremony of the Muisca rulers. The new chief was coated in gold dust and taken on a raft to the center of the sacred Lake Guatavita. At sunrise, when the light struck his golden body, the chief would dive into the lake, thus washing the gold off, and would emerge as a human ruler born from the divine golden sun. Music, shouting, and then tossing of large quantities of gold into the lake accompanied the ceremony.

However, some experts doubt that the El Dorado depicted in the legend represents the ceremony at Lake Guatavita. The city of El Dorado probably never existed, but El Dorado the Golden Man has a foundation in historical truth; El Dorado probably referred to the ruler of the Muisca.

==== Pasca chiefdom ====
The artifact was made for a votive offering ensemble—composed of the raft, a litter, the vase for the artifacts to be placed in, a smaller vase, and potentially a feline bone—, probably commissioned by the ruler of the Pasca chiefdom (or uzaque) described by the Spanish colonial chronicler Pedro Simon. During the time of the raft's confection, between approximately 1200 and 1400 AD, the Pasca chiefdom was emerging, due to its participation in trade networks and its proximity to non-Muisca groups and powerful Muisca chiefdoms. The offering "could have been made by a Pasca chief at a particular juncture, such as his appointment, […] a period of untest" or by "important caciques such as those of Bogotá, Guasca, or Guatavita" to "exercise their power and dominance […] or reinforce alliances".

== Overview ==
=== Description ===
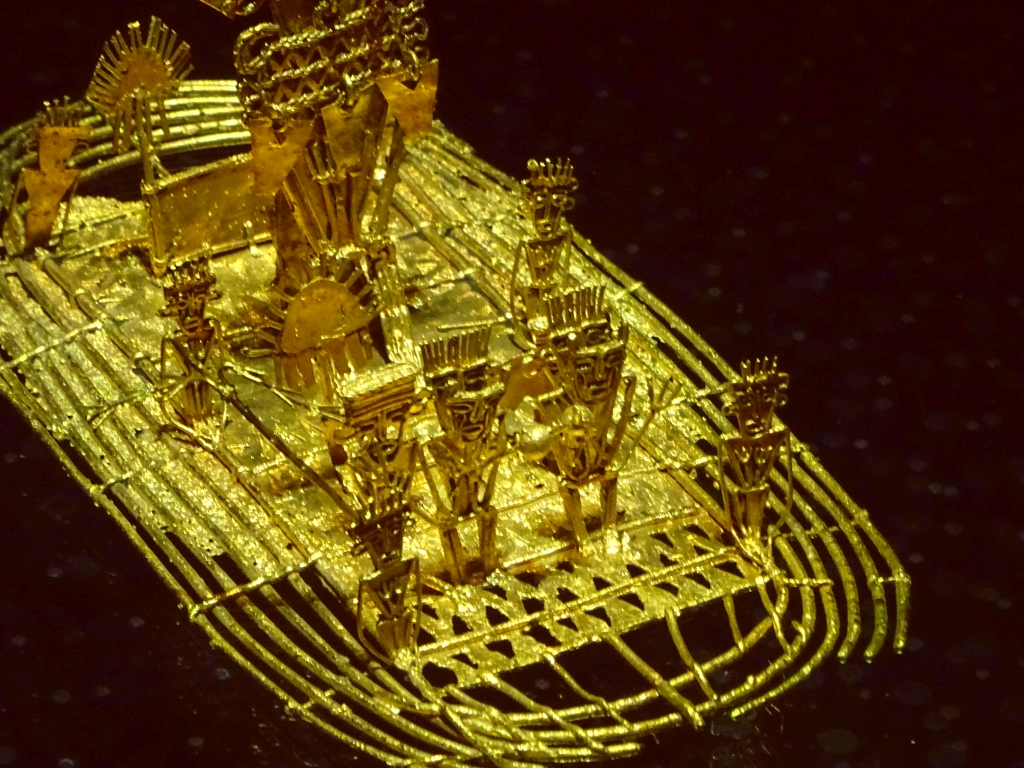
Muisca raft detail

The Muisca raft is a small votive offering made from an alloy of gold, silver, and copper. It measures 19.5 cm (7.7 in) long, by 10.2 cm (4.0 in) wide, by 10.1 cm (4.0 in) high. The raft contains eleven human figures – a central, large seated figure representing the chief or cacique, surrounded by ten smaller figures, representing attendants and oarsmen, some of whom wear masks. The figures rest on top of an oval-shaped reed raft, which is composed of a triangle-patterned central support structure, with wire coils around the perimeter. Like most Muisca goldworking, there are no figures-in-the-round; each figure is cast as a flat plaque, adorned on the front side with wire-like details and gold jewelry.

The surface of the piece is unpolished and appears crude in comparison to Muisca jewelry, but like other votive offerings, the Muisca raft was not intended to be decorative but rather a symbolic offering; the appearance of this piece was typical for its use. Microscopic examination did not reveal any joint anywhere on the raft; the piece, and every ornamental detail, including dangling gold decorations, was created in a single pour of gold. The manufacturing process was intensive; the entire process, from shaping a beeswax template to breaking the mould and revealing the gold piece, likely required hundreds of hours of work undertaken by a single craftsperson.

==== Main figure ====
The central figure, the cacique, is naked, seated, and folds his arms over his chest in a W pattern, a common feature in Muisca gold pieces. He wears a large rectangular nose pendant, adorned with bird heads and trapezoidal decorations, as well as a headdress and possibly a crown. Additional trapezoidal adornments can be seen: three pendants, two ear pendants, and three others around the body. He is seated on a duho (a small chair with a high backrest), and leaning backward. The cacique is surrounded by banners and feather-like projections.

The main figure's importance is apparent from his size and his richly adorned body. The nose pendant is also significant in identifying the chief; according to one Spanish chronicler, future caciques were locked in houses from a young age and when they emerged years later, they pierced their ears and wore gold nose pendants to indicate their new status. Nose pendants were among the most detailed and ornate items in Muisca goldworking. The duho is also associated with the chief, and it is significant that none of the figures that surround the central figure face him—a sign of reverence to the cacique.

==== Attendants and oarsmen ====
The remaining ten figures that surround the cacique, while all much smaller than him, can be grouped into three sizes: two larger figures standing in the front and center of the raft; two medium sized seated figures that surround them; and six smaller standing figures. The two large figures in the front each wear a headdress with eleven feathers, carry a maraca (rattle), wear a mask in the shape of an animal head, and carry a trident next to their waist. The two medium-sized figures flank the larger two, and wear a coiled headdress possibly meant to represent fabric. They each carry a poporo — a gourd-shaped flask that contained the lime that was chewed along with coca leaves. The smaller six figures are positioned around the perimeter of the raft and each wears a headdress and carries a small stick.

The makeup is as follows:
Element (symbol)	% by composition
Gold (Au)	64.7±0.9
Silver (Ag)	16.1±0.4
Copper (Cu)	19.2±1.2

==== Technical details ====
The uniformity of the figures suggest that the raft was created by a single, highly trained artisan. Researchers have applied radiocarbon dating to remnants of charcoal that were left on the raft by the casting mould; the tests yielded a date of 1295–1410 AD for the raft's construction. Using X-ray fluorescence, researchers have identified the "chemical signature" of the gold used in the Muisca raft, and concluded that it came from the lowlands near the banks of the Magdalena river where people still pan for gold today.

=== Discovery ===
There are two known Muisca golden rafts; one from Pasca, the subject of this article, and another from Siecha, which was lost. The Siecha raft was the first to be discovered, and it aided in the discovery of the Pasca raft. In 1856, two brothers from Siecha by the names of Joaquín and Bernardino Tovar partially drained a nearby lagoon, and found a votive raft that they associated with the ceremony referred to in the legend of El Dorado. It was in the hands of diplomat Salomón Koppel who sold it to a museum in Germany, the Ethnologisches Museum. However, when the artifact arrived in the port of Bremen it was destroyed in a fire. Nevertheless, through reverse engineering, a group from Universidad de los Andes (UNIANDES), in Bogotá, Colombia, recreated the Siecha raft in gold and identified a plausible casting process.

A century later, in 1969, a peasant from Pasca by the name of Cruz María Dimaté found several pieces of gold and ceramics in a cave, and described them to Father Jaime Hincapié Santamaría, a parish priest. The priest showed Dimaté a drawing of the Siecha raft in a book by Liborio Zerda, and Dimaté confirmed its similarity to the newly found raft. Father Santamaría arranged for the object to be acquired by the Bank of the Republic and placed in the Gold Museum where it remains.

== Creation ==
=== Raw materials ===
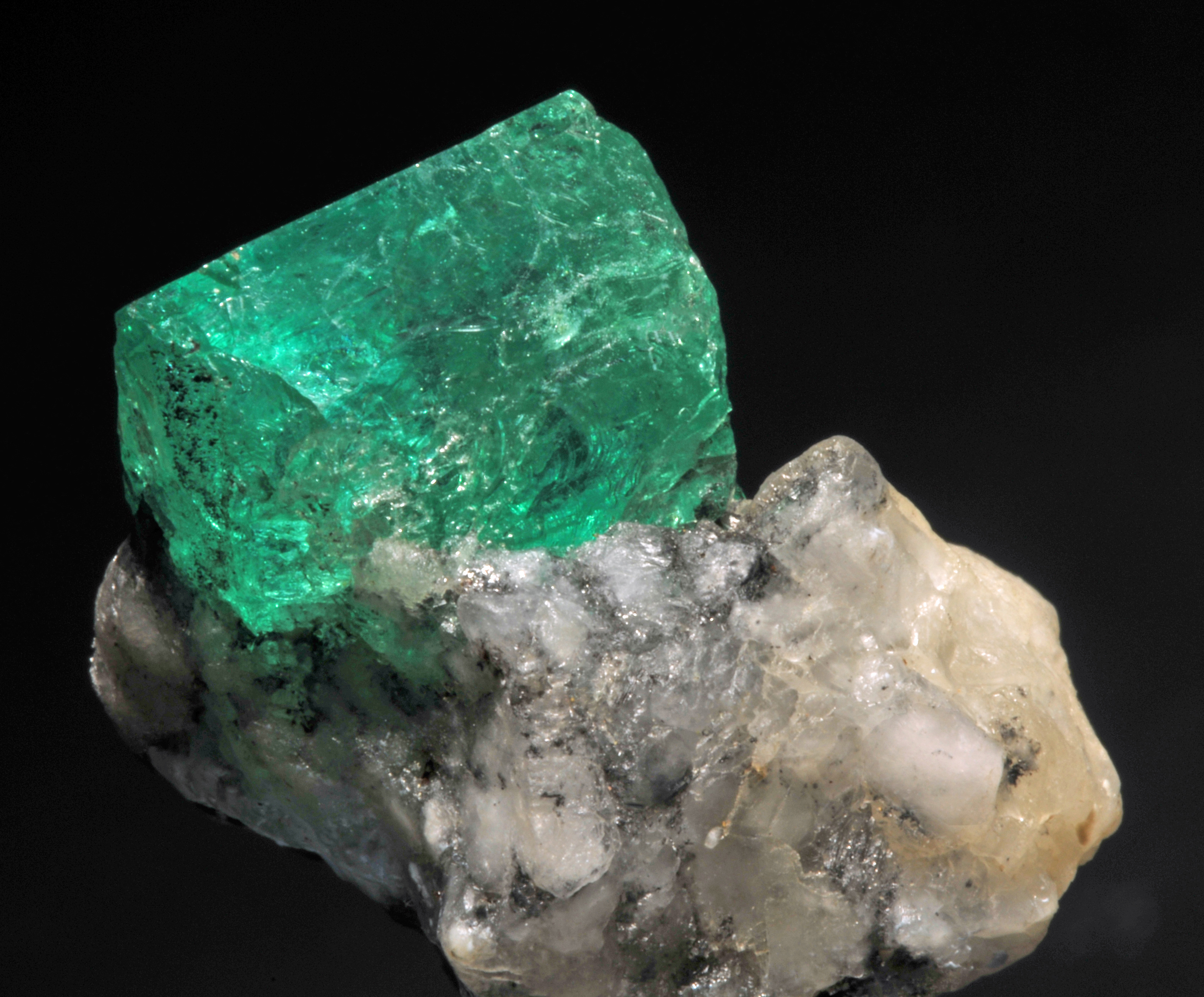
Colombian emerald. The Muisca traded salt, emeralds, and cotton cloth for gold.

The Muisca bartered their salt, emeralds, and cotton cloth to obtain the gold needed for tunjos. The altitude of the region varied greatly, creating small ecological zones in which one or more resources were lacking in each locale, which encouraged trade. Ethnographic studies reveal trade networks in the highlands of Colombia connecting it to surrounding regions, and Spanish language sources confirm that these networks extended to the Inca territories. Barter between the highlands and coast exchanged fish, shells, and gold for coca leaves, chili peppers, and colored feathers. Local traders moved materials between the gold mining regions and the gold-working regions, in which finished products were exchanged for raw gold. Muisca artisans used gold alloys with a variety of different compositions, resulting in a wide range of colourations.

=== Lost-wax casting ===
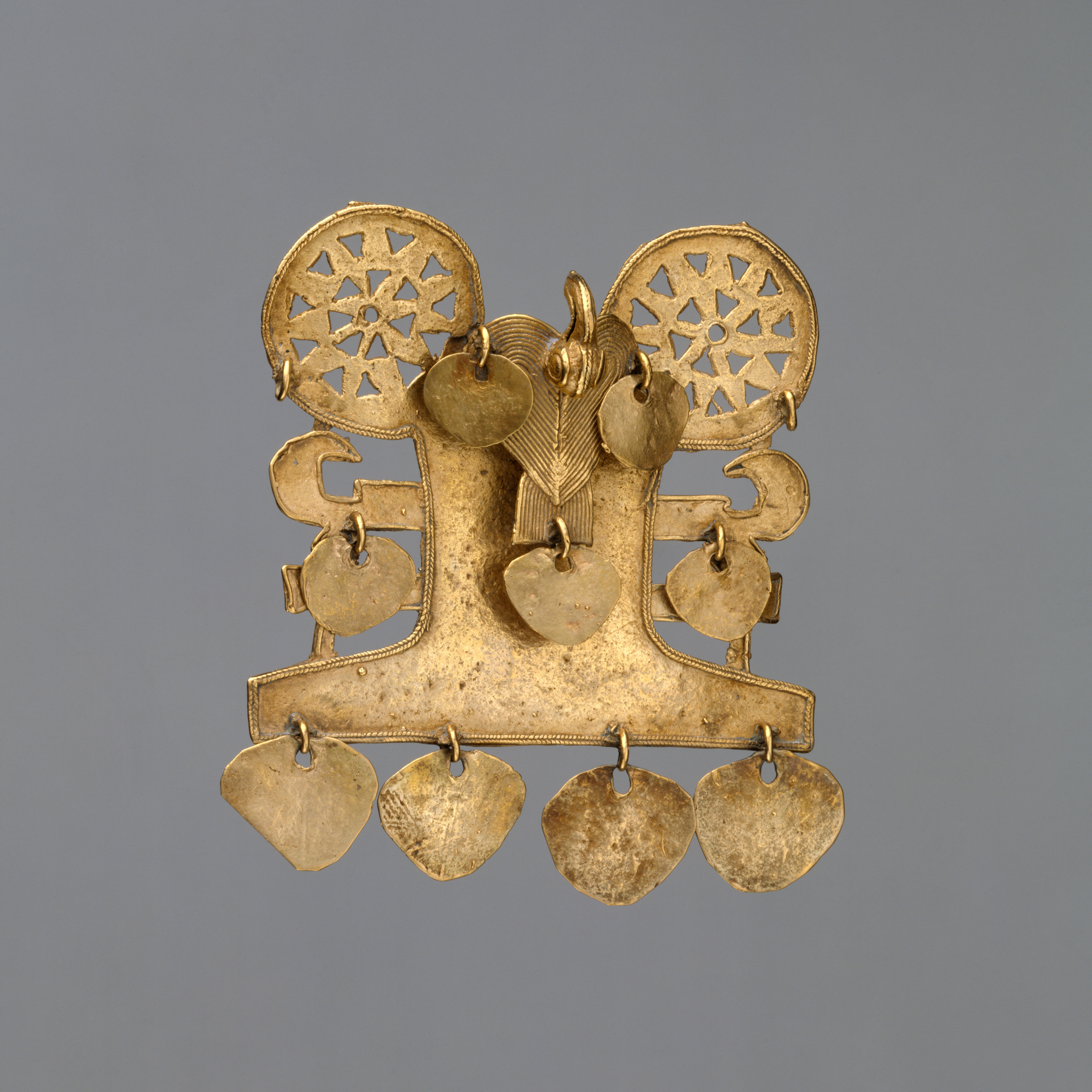
Pendant with bird. Muisca, 10th–16th C., cast gold alloy. Metropolitan Museum of Art. This object illustrates the fine detail of the casting and the unpolished surface of the gold.

To create their gold pieces, the Muisca used a method called lost-wax casting. The manufacturing process itself was likely part of the ritual associated with these tunjos. The process began when the Muisca craftsperson created a wax model in the desired shape of the object, using beeswax harvested from the region. The beeswax was worked into two basic shapes: flat sheets from which geometric shapes could be cut out, such as for the figure's torso; and threads of rolled beeswax, as thin as 1 mm (0.039 in), that could be used for coils and adornments, including finer details such as the eyes or feathers. These constructions reveal great skill on the part of the artisan – the components are highly uniform with few mistakes. The only signs of finger work occur on the bottom of the raft where elements of the design were pressed into the soft base. Each of the wax figures was likely created as a separate piece before being fused together into the ensemble, perhaps by using a warm tool. In addition to the intended design, the artisan added wax feeders allowing for the flow of molten gold.

The wax figurine was then thoroughly covered in a wet, equal mixture of fine charcoal and clay, to form a mould. For the casting process to succeed, it was necessary to pack the wet mixture around the wax, being careful to fill every crevice thoroughly, ensuring that components that are meant to dangle, such as earrings, do not become fused together during casting. The artisan showed great skill in filling these cracks without breaking or warping the soft beeswax. For repeated elements, such as in a string of beads or pendants, the Muisca used stone matrices – blocks that have a figure carved in relief – to aid with the building of the wax template; this ensured some uniformity in the repeated element. The mould was built in successive layers, and the artisan may have increased the ratio of clay to charcoal and also increased the grain size of the mixture as the mould grew in size – to improve its structural integrity. The only portion of the wax model that was not covered was a small opening near the bow of the raft where the molten gold would later be poured in.

Once the clay and charcoal mould dried and hardened, the artisan applied heat to melt the beeswax, and allowed it to run out of the opening, creating a figurine-shaped cavity in the clay. This was the only mould used to cast the Muisca raft. Just prior to the actual casting, the mould was pre-heated to several hundred degrees to allow the smooth flow of molten gold into all the cracks and details before hardening; it also helped protect against fracture from cooling too fast. The final step in the casting was to hammer open the mould, revealing a perfect copy of the beeswax figurine, this time in gold. However, the Muisca raft did have issues during the casting process—a fracture developed at the base of the piece, resulting in a large portion of the raft's base, which was meant to be a crisscross of openwork, showing a thin, solid gold sheet instead.

=== Depletion gilding ===
When the casting was complete, the artisan may have treated the piece with depletion gilding, a technique for increasing the purity of gold on the surface of the object. Colombian gold was combined with copper in an alloy called tumbaga, a Malay word meaning 'copper', and the composition of the alloy was especially chosen by the Muisca craftsperson for each votive offering piece. The depletion gilding process works on the principle that gold is resistant to oxidation whereas other metals are not. The piece is treated by coating the surface with acid or packing it in salt, which reacts with the silver and copper contained in the alloy, but does not react with the gold. The result is a piece with a higher purity of gold on the surface than in the center of the object; the process can be adjusted to yield a variety of surface colorations of the metal. The Muisca generally did not do much else in the way of finishing their gold work, and the Muisca raft followed that trend. There was no effort to fix casting errors, and the surface remained unpolished; charcoal remnants from the mould were left in crevices on the figures.

=== Offering ===
The offering that contained the Muisca raft was placed in a cave in the side of a hill, known as La Campana, located between Lázaro Fonte and El Retiro streets in the Pasca municipality, Cundinamarca. The offering contained three other artifacts, including a smaller gold work, two ceramics (including a large offering vessel and a smaller vessel); it may have also included a feline skull that has been lost. The smaller gold work was also a lost-wax casting depicting a human sitting in a litter, or a basket for carrying royalty using human muscle power. The piece depicts the human with closed eyes and an elongated mouth showing the teeth. The larger ceramic piece was 25.8 cm (10.2 in) high by 31.5 cm (12.4 in) wide, is made of fine paste, and was covered by a red slip. The smaller, rounded vessel was well constructed and finished with a smooth surface and buff.

Muisca offerings were common, and varied across time and place. Offerings included human gold effigies, ceramics, emeralds, hair, blood, and animal skulls; and were deposited in lakes, caves, and behind waterfalls. The purpose of the offering was to gain favor with a deity in hopes they will provide healing; or to bless a marriage, harvest, building, or ceremony. Offerings may also have been associated with political power, as various chiefdoms vied for power.

Sometimes the offering was placed by a jeque, or priest, and sometimes it was placed by a layperson. According to Spanish accounts, the offerings were made to gain favor with a deity, and indeed each shrine was associated with a distinct god that heard specific concerns. Uribe Villegas details the account of one Spanish chronicler:

The Muisca had one god for each necessity. Chibchacum, of the Bogotá province, was the god of merchants, goldsmiths, peasants, and wealthy people; Nencatacoa, of drunkenness, weavers, and blanket painters. Cuchaviva, the rainbow, to whom one should offer figurines of "low karat gold", was the god of childbirth. Among the many gods, Bochica, the main deity, was lord of chiefs and captains, and, like Chibchacum, received only gold offerings.

The message of a Muisca offering was more important than the display. In the case of the Pasca offering containing the Muisca raft, it is likely that it was a response to current political tensions among various chiefdoms in the region. In a time of tension, the raft offering may have been an effort to "reinforce the prestige of a leader in a circumstantial situation". It is likely that the raft was commissioned by a powerful person such as the cacique. The raft itself was time consuming and produced to a high quality, as were the other objects in the offering. The offering vessel itself is one of the largest known from the Muisca.

== Looting and protection ==
Although neither conquistadors nor treasure hunters ever witnessed the ceremony, its legend enticed Europeans, who desired gold to pay for their ships, weapons, and horses, and, they hoped, for personal riches. As a result, adventurers have attempted to recover more artifacts. Heidi King describes such efforts:

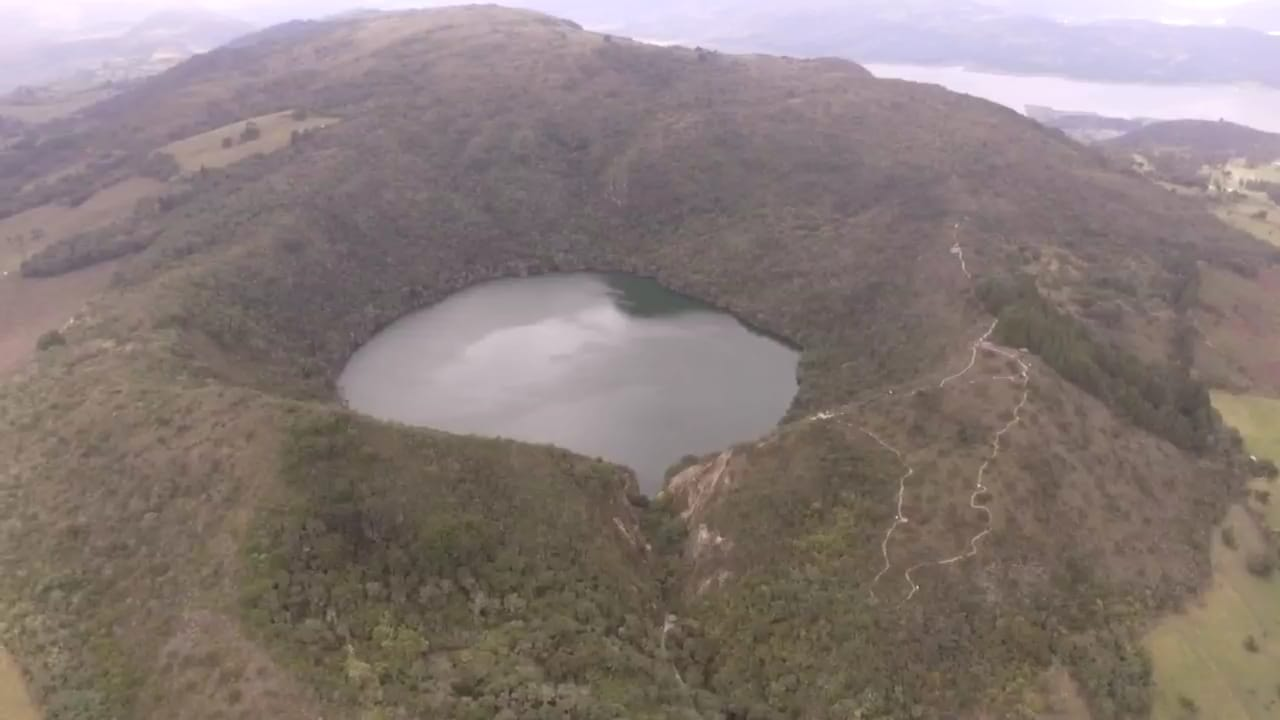
Lake Guatavita with prominent notch cut into its side. The lake was partially drained in the late 16th century by treasure hunters.

In the centuries since the conquest countless lives and great fortunes have been lost in attempts to recover the treasures. The most serious effort was undertaken at the end of the sixteenth century by a wealthy merchant from Santa Fe de Bogota who, with the help of eight thousand local workmen, cut a great notch—still prominent in the landscape—into the mountain on one side of the lake and lowered the water level by about sixty feet. Countless gold objects, and other offerings, including an emerald the size of a hen's egg, were recovered from the edges of the lake bed. Several expeditions followed, but the central zone of the lake remains untouched.

The Spanish found large quantities of gold in Lake Guatavita. When searching for treasure in the lake became too costly, they took gold pieces directly from the Muisca in their villages. The stolen artifacts were melted into ingots and doubloons, which Phillip II had shipped back to Spain.

Today, protections are in place to preserve the Muisca heritage, including tunjos like the Muisca raft. As part of Colombia's historical and cultural heritage plan, the government placed Lake Guatavita under legal protection in 1965. The Muisca raft, together with a large collection of other tunjos, are held at the Gold Museum in Bogotá. The museum's director, archaeologist Maria Alicia Uribe Villegas, as well as archaeometallurgist Marcos Martinón-Torres, have applied modern techniques to study and preserve over 80 such tunjos at the museum. On 10 March 2004 Colombia's postal service released a souvenir sheet depicting the Muisca raft on two postage stamps.

== See also ==
- Muisca
- El Dorado
- Muisca goldworking
- Lake Guatavita
- Colombian mythology
- Indigenous peoples in Colombia
