= Postal codes in Austria =

Austrian post code system

Postal codes in Austria were introduced in 1966. known locally as 'Postleitzahlen' (PLZ) are a fundamental aspect of the nation's logistical infrastructure, providing a systematic means of organizing mail delivery and geographical categorization. The term 'Postleitzahlen' translates to 'postal codes' in English.

Austria's postal codes typically consist of four digits, with the initial digit often representing one of Austria's nine federal states, providing a broad regional categorization. However, exceptions exist where certain regions or municipalities may share the same initial digit despite belonging to different states, or where specific geographic or administrative factors may result in variations to this pattern. The subsequent digits refine the geographical scope further, identifying specific districts and municipalities within the respective state. These codes are instrumental in facilitating efficient mail delivery, enabling precise localization of addresses across Austria's diverse landscape.

== System ==
The first indicates the state:

- 1xxx: Vienna
- 2xxx: Lower Austria (east of Vienna)
- 3xxx: Lower Austria (west of Vienna)
- 4xxx: Upper Austria
- 5xxx: Salzburg and west Upper Austria
- 6xxx: Tyrol and Vorarlberg (without East Tyrol)
- 7xxx: Burgenland
- 8xxx: Styria
- 9xxx: Carinthia and East Tyrol

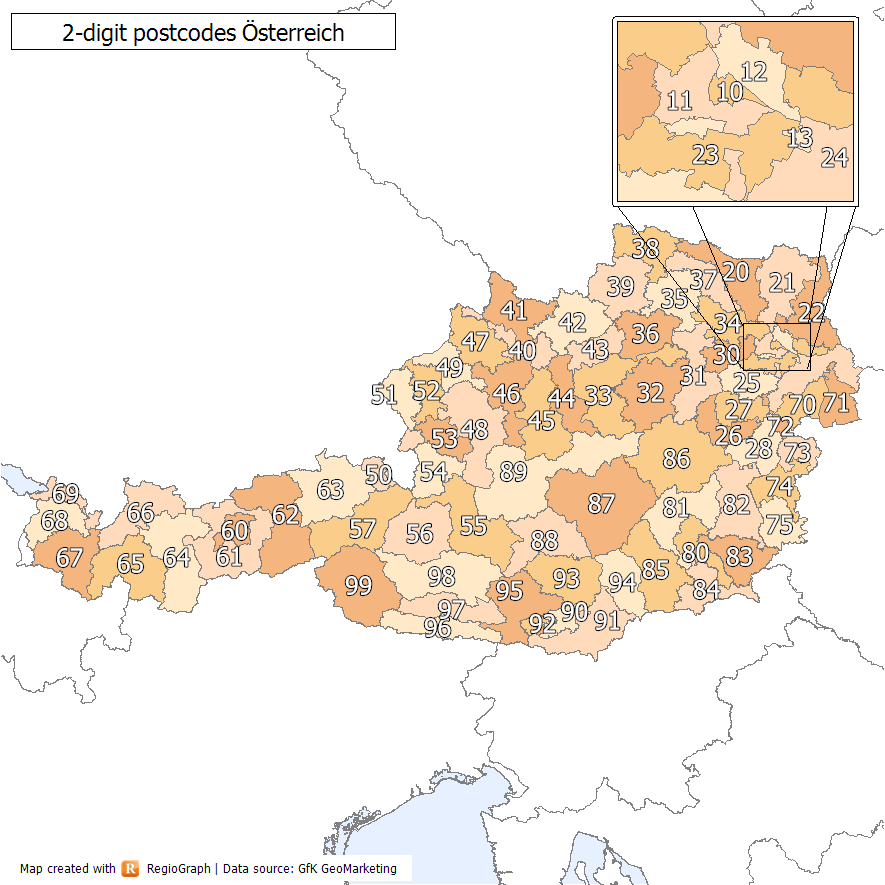
2-digit postcode areas Austria(defined through the first two postcode digits)

The second number indicates the regional area in the state, the third number is for the routing allocation, following railways and post car routes and the fourth number indicates the post office. Every post office has its own number. There are some exceptions to this rule: In Vienna, the second and third numbers show the district, so 1120 would be the twelfth district. Also, some cities close to the German border in Vorarlberg have Austrian and German postcodes.

There are also some special post codes: the airport has its own post code (1300), the UN (1400) and some big companies also have their own post code, for example the ORF, the Austrian National Broadcasting Service (1136). These special post codes are not listed in the public phonebook, though there is a book which contains them and can be bought at an Austrian post office.

== See also ==
- See List of national postal services#Europe – Europe
