= Congolese Posts and Savings Company =

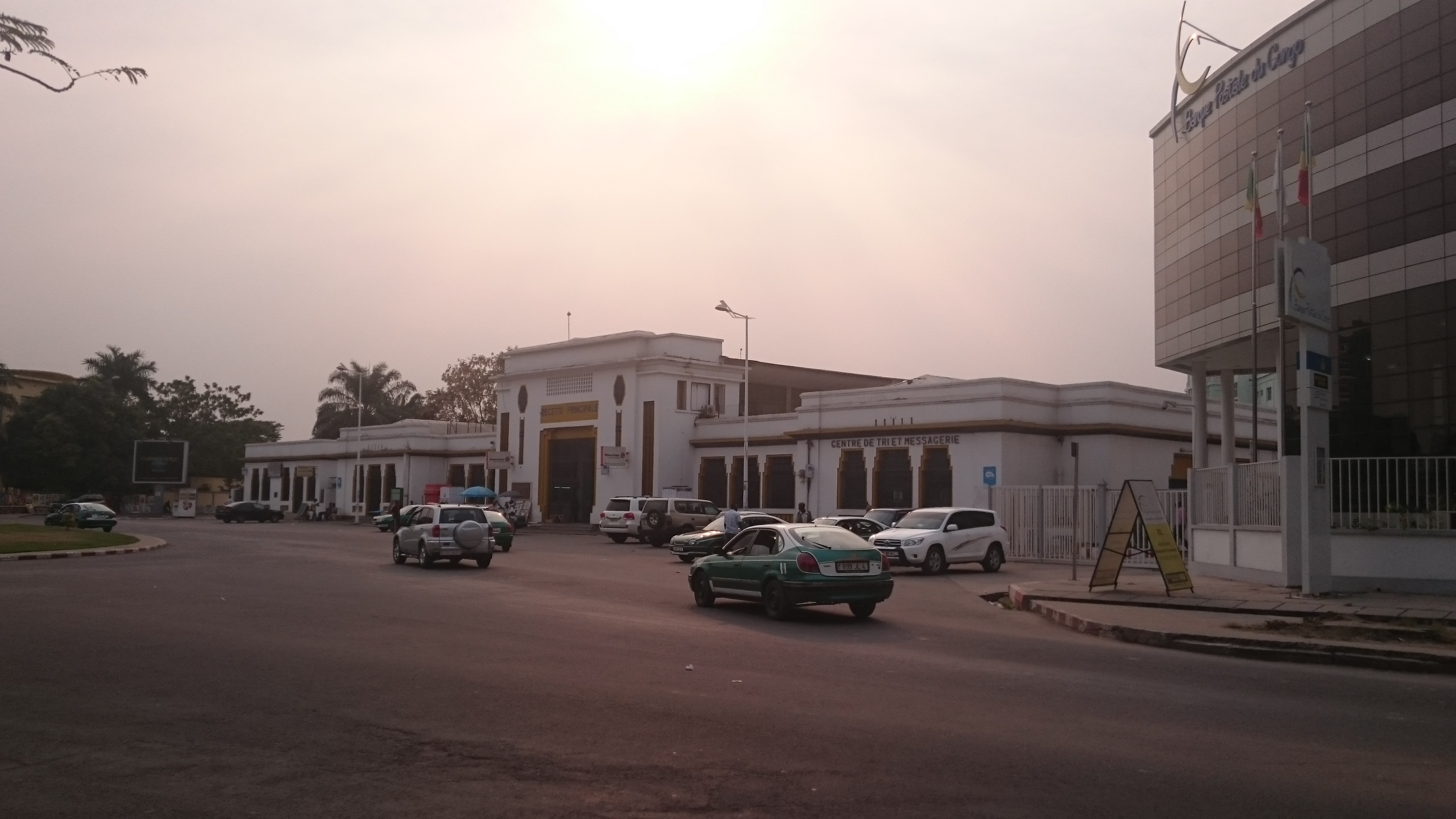
Brazzaville Post Office, 2015

The Congolese Posts and Savings Company (French: Société des postes et d'épargne du Congo, pronounced [sɔsjete de pɔst e depaʁɲ dy kɔ̃ɡo], SOPECO) is a government owned postal company in the Republic of Congo. It is a corporation created on 1 July 2001 by Ordinance No. 10-2001. There are forty-eight post offices, mostly in major cities. Many private corporations provide postal services, often without the permission of the government. Many of these companies have been in business since before any legislation regulating the postal industry had been passed.

Originally the postal administration was admitted into the Universal Postal Union on 3 May 1961 and remains a member. Post codes are not used in the Congo.

== See also ==
- Postage stamps and postal history of the Republic of the Congo
