= Société Nationale des Postes et Services Financiers =

- Industry: Postal services, courier
- Headquarters: BP 5000, Moroni, Comoros
- Services: Letter post, parcel service, EMS, delivery, Financial services
- Website: snpsf.com

The Société Nationale des Postes et Services Financiers is the public operator responsible for postal service in Comoros. Nadjib Dhakoine was appointed as the CEO in April of 2017.

== See also ==
- Communications in Comoros
