= National Post Company of the Islamic Republic of Iran =

National postal operator of Iran

Iran Post Company
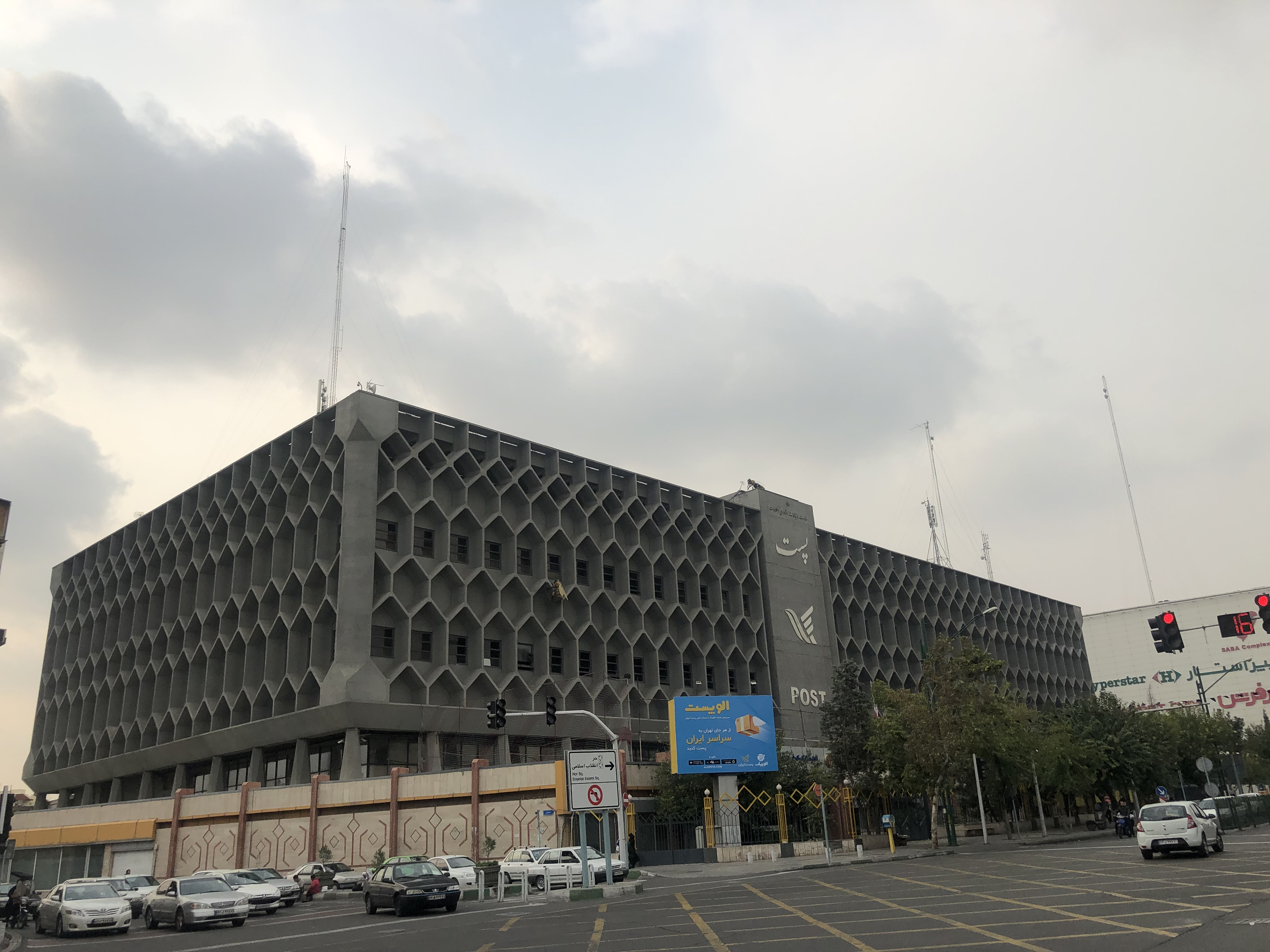
- Iran Post headquarters in Tehran
- Type: Public
- Founder: Ministry of Information and Communications Technology of Iran
- Headquarters: Tehran, Iran
- Area served: Worldwide
- Key people: Mohammad Ahmadi (CEO)
- Products: Post
- Website: Post.ir

Iran Post is the government-owned and operated corporation responsible for providing postal services in Iran.

== See also ==
- List of national postal services#Asia
