= Correos de Nicaragua =

Nicaraguan Postal Service (Correos de Nicaragua)
- Company type: Public Service
- Industry: Postal administration
- Founded: Nicaragua
- Headquarters: Managua
- Products: First Class mail Domestic Mail; Express Mail; Logistics
- Revenue: unknown
- Website: Official Website

The Nicaraguan Postal Service (Spanish: Correos de Nicaragua), is a postal service that is decentralized from the Nicaraguan government, but offers a public service to the people.

== See also ==
- Universal Postal Union
- Postal Union of the Americas, Spain and Portugal
