= Correos de El Salvador =

National post office of El Salvador

- Industry: Postal service
- Headquarters: El Salvador
- Website: www.correos.gob.sv

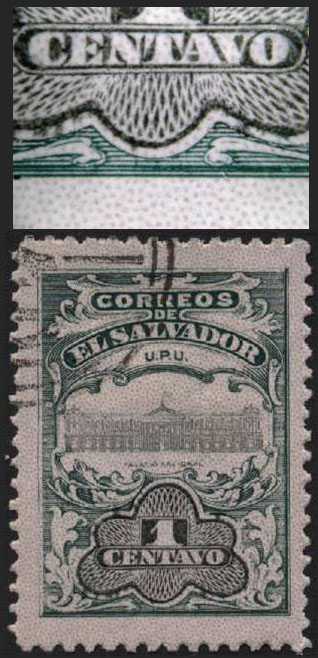
El Salvador 1907 1c Stamp with Colored Dots magnified.

Correos de El Salvador is the national post office of El Salvador.
