= Gambia Postal Services Corporation =

The Gambia Postal Services Corporation or GAMPOST is the company responsible for postal service in the Gambia.

GAMPOST was established by an Act of Parliament in 2005 to provide a national postal service within The Gambia and between places outside The Gambia. The public corporation offers also domestic money transfer (DMT), called Postal Money Transfer (PMT).

Its registered Head Office is in the capital Banjul, 3 Liberation Avenue. Postal service branches are also in Serrekunda, Bakau, Brikama, Soma, Farafenni, Kerewan, Kaur, Janganbureh, Basse, Wassu, Brusubi, Bwiam and at the Banjul International Airport.

GAMPOST is a member of the Universal Postal Union and the Pan-African Postal Union, who are setting the rules for international mail exchanges.
