= Postal Corporation of Jamaica =

The Postal Corporation of Jamaica Ltd. is the national post office of Jamaica.
