= Société tchadienne des postes et de l'épargne =

Société tchadienne des postes et de l'épargne (lit. 'Chadian Post and Savings Company', STPE) is the company responsible for postal service in Chad. The STPE was created by Law 008/PR/1998 of 17 August 1998, and was renewed by Law No. 015/PR/2014 of 21 March 2014. It is endowed with financial and management autonomy, and placed under the supervision of the Ministry of New Information and Communication Technologies. The Regulatory Authority for Electronic Communications and Posts (ARCEP) is responsible for ensuring compliance with the operating rules of the postal sector.
