= SALPOST =

Sierra Leone Postal Service Ltd
- Company type: State-owned enterprise
- Industry: Postal service
- Headquarters: Freetown, Sierra Leone
- Website: salpost.gov.sl

SALPOST (Sierra Leone Postal Services Limited) is the national post office of Sierra Leone.

Sierra Leone Postal Service Ltd, also known as SALPOST, is the national post office of Sierra Leone.

A member of the Universal Postal Union, Sierra Leone officially joined the Universal Postal Union on 29 January 1962.
