= Régie Nationale des Postes =

Postal service in Burundi

National Postal Administration
- Trade name: RNP
- Native name: Régie Nationale des Postes
- Type: Government owned
- Industry: Postal services
- Founded: January 1, 1992; 34 years ago
- Headquarters: Boulevard Emery Patrice Lumumba, Bujumbura
- Area served: Burundi
- Products: Postal delivery
- Website: https://www.poste-burundi.bi/fr/

Régie Nationale des Postes is the company responsible for postal service in Burundi.

Previously a function of the Ministry of Transport, Posts and Telecommunications, it was reformed by decree number 100/021 of 7 March 1991, officially establishing the service as a separate entity on 1 January 1992.

== See also ==
- Communications in Burundi
- List of companies of Burundi
- Economy of Burundi
