= Eritrean Postal Service =

Agency overview
- Type: Postal service
- Jurisdiction: Government of Eritrea
- Headquarters: Asmara, Eritrea; 15°20′N 38°56′E
- Agency executive: Girmatsion Tewelde, Manager
- Website: eripostal.com

The Eritrean Postal Service (EPS) is the government organisation responsible for the postal service in Eritrea.

In 2009, the Eritrean Postal Service delivered 1.8 million letters.

== See also ==
- Communications in Eritrea
