= La Poste du Togo =

La Poste du Togo is the company responsible for postal service in Togo.

Togo is a member of the West African Postal Conference.
