= CAMPOST =

Cameroonian public Company providing postal services

- Type: State-owned enterprise
- Industry: Courier
- Founded: 23 April 2004; 22 years ago
- Headquarters: Boulevard du 20 mai Yaounde, Cameroon
- Area served: National
- Products: postal products, financial and "innovative products".
- Number of employees: ▲894 (2022)

CAMPOST is the company responsible for postal service in Cameroon.

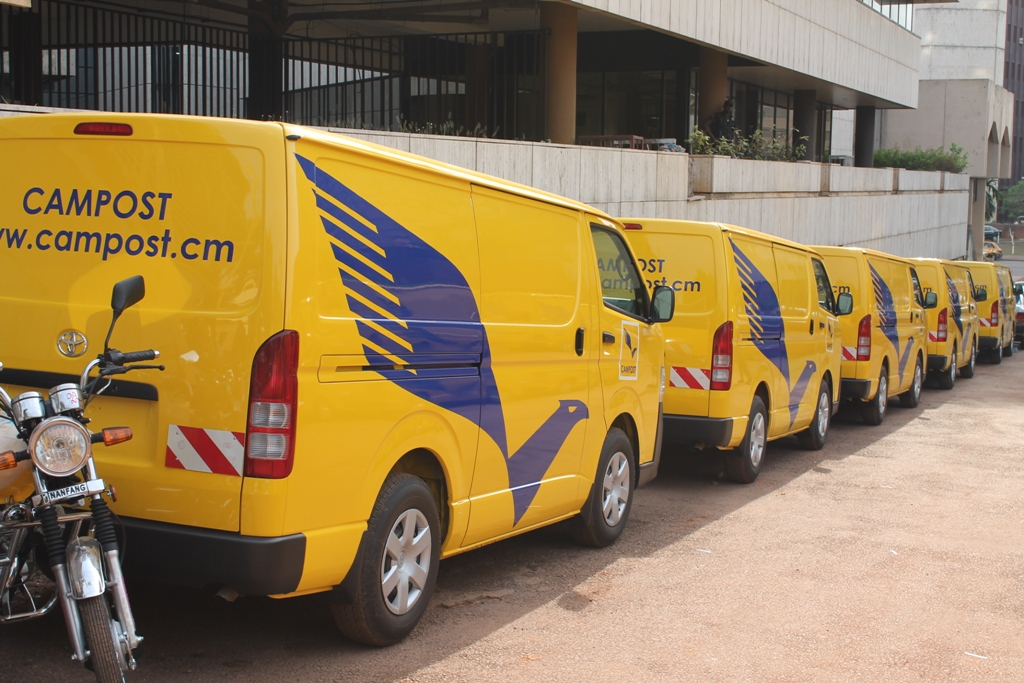
CAMPOST mail delivery vehicles.

It offers postal products, banking services and business services including server hosting, videoconferencing and IP phone services.

It has been a member of the Universal Postal Union since 26 July 1960. CAMPOST is regulated by the Agence de régulation des marchés publics (ARMP).

== Creation ==
CAMPOST is a public postal enterprise created by presidential decree in April 2004. As of 1 January 2007, the state of Cameroon was the sole shareholder. Since 2007, CAMPOST is managed by the Canadian company Tecsult International Limited, responsible for cleaning up its management. The Cameroon Postal Services is placed under the technical supervision of the Ministry of Posts and Telecommunications and under the financial supervision of the Ministry of Finance.

18th Anniversary : 23 April 2022

CAMPOST does the following:

- Builds and operates postal networks and services.
- Provides postal financial services.
- Promotes national savings.
- Offers money transfer services.
- Provides insurance and estate management services

== Products and services ==
The Cameroon Postal Services offers several products and services to its different targets. They can be grouped under postal products, financial and "innovative products".

Poster Products	Financial Products	Innovative Products	logistics Product
Express Mail Service (EMS)	Current Accounts of Postal Cheques	Call Centre	CAMLOG
Courrier des Administrations et des Entreprises (CADEN)	Transfer (MELO and MEI)	CAMPOST Videoconference	
Post Office Box	Postal savings	CAMPOST Telesurveillance	
Philately	School fees loan	Interconnected Solutions	
Post Packages	Mandate card	Data Center	
Publipostage	Mandate letter	E-commerce	
Letters	Insurance	CampostMoney	
City post	eSchool	ePeage	
	CAMO		

== Local ==
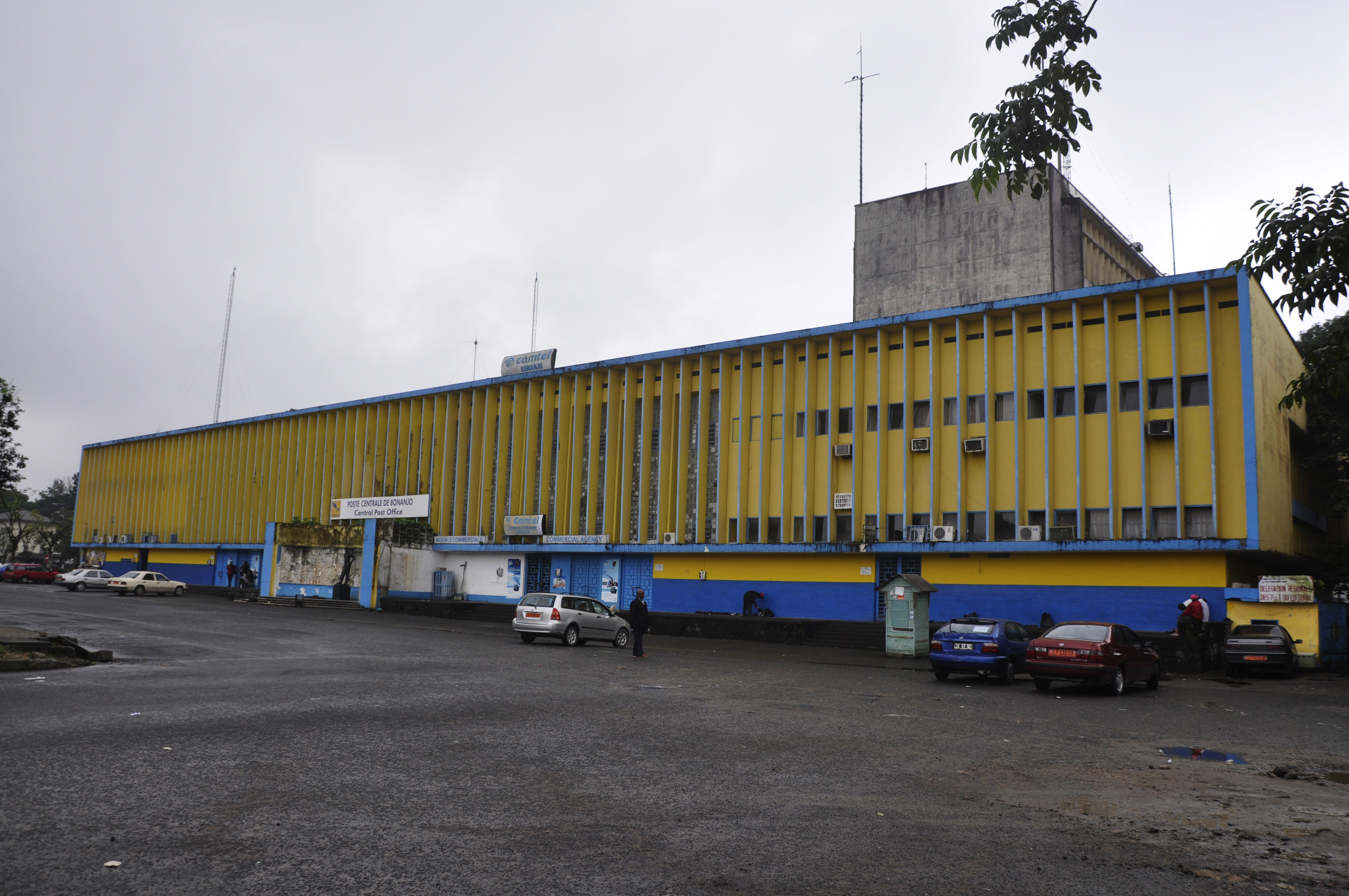
Poste centrale of Douala (Right view)

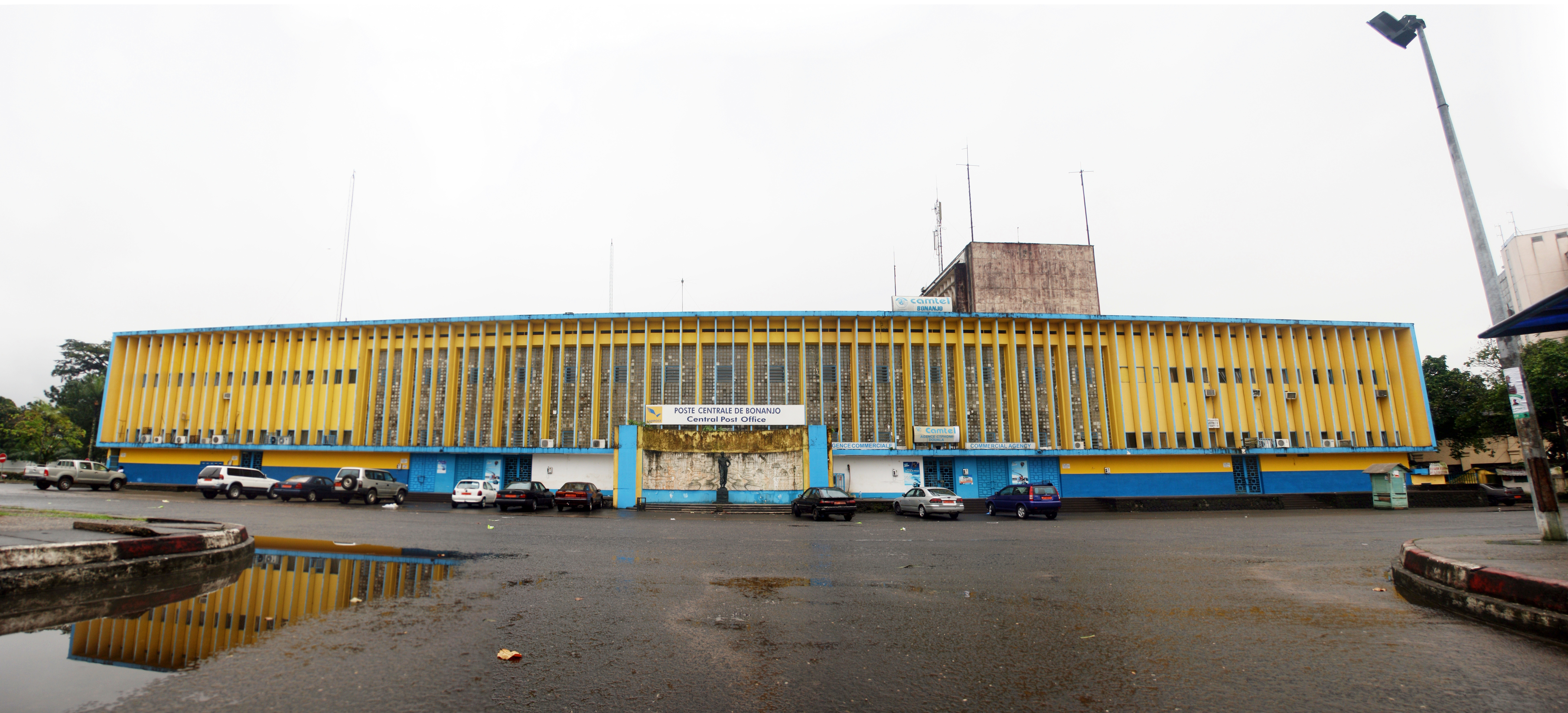
Poste centrale of Douala (front view)

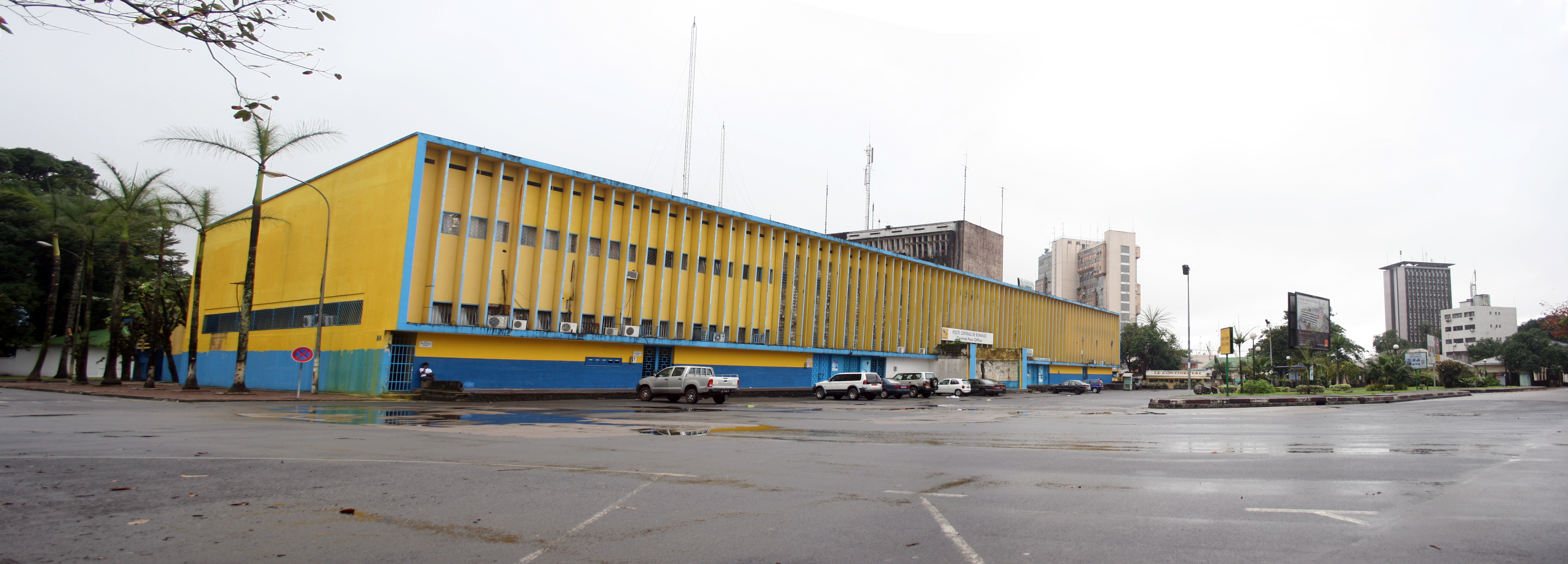
Poste centrale of Douala (left view)

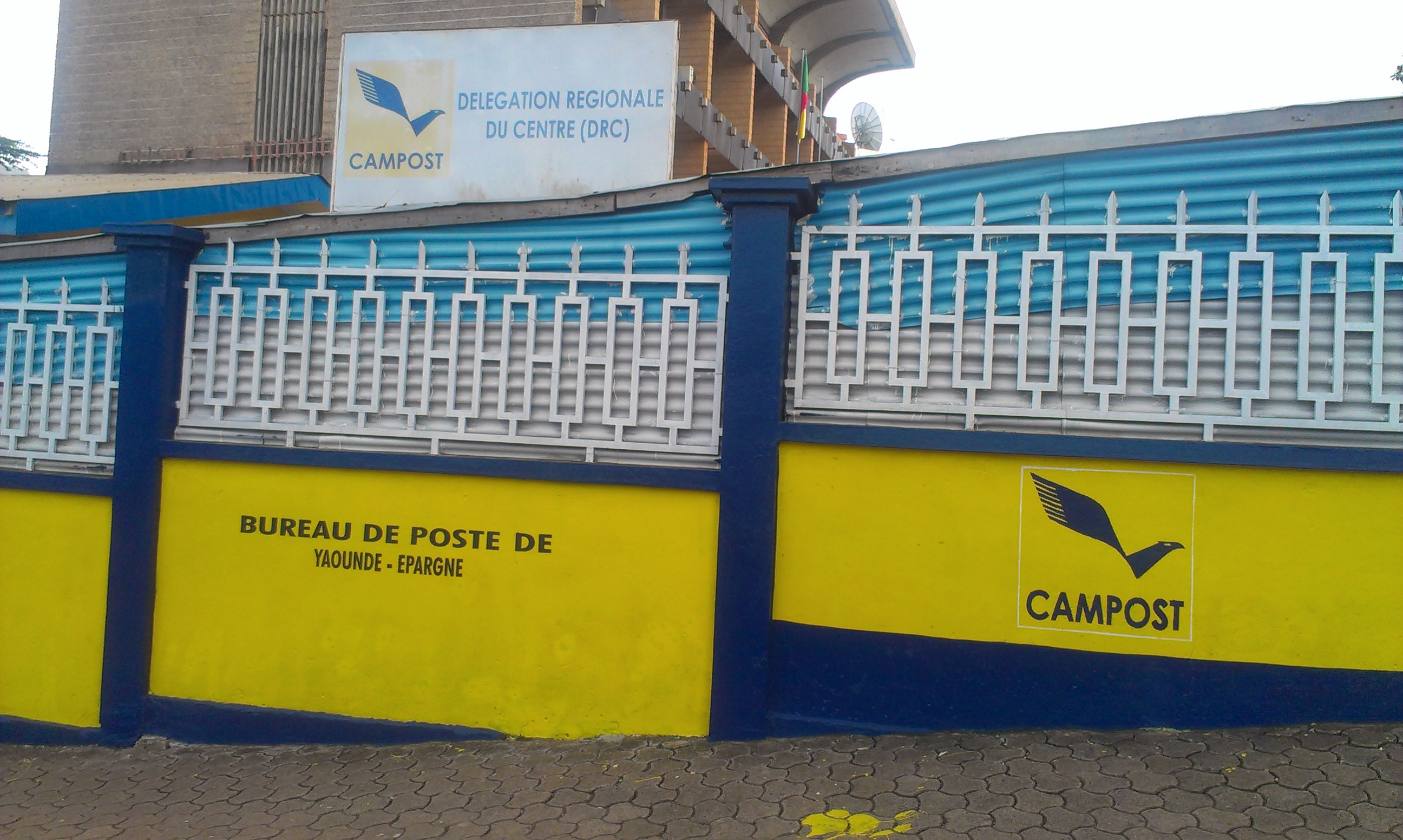
Bureau Campost at Yaoundé
