= Post PNG =

- Type: Postal service
- Headquarters: National Capital District
- Location: Papua New Guinea
- Website: www.postpng.com.pg

Post PNG is the organisation responsible for postal service in Papua New Guinea. It is a member of the Universal Postal Union and was created by the Postal Services Act 1996.

Post PNG operates 40 post offices and has around 350 employees.

== See also ==
- Australia Post
- Postage stamps and postal history of Papua New Guinea
