= Yemen Post =

Yemen Postal Authority (Arabic: البريد اليمني, lit. 'Yemeni Post') is the national postal authority of Yemen. It has the sole privilege of providing domestic and international postal services such as letter post, parcel post, money orders, postal banking, EMS, fax, philately etc. The Ministry of Communications and Information Technologies supervises Yemen Post's activities.

== See also ==
- Postage stamps and postal history of Yemen
