= La Poste (Ivory Coast) =

Postal company in Côte d'Ivoire

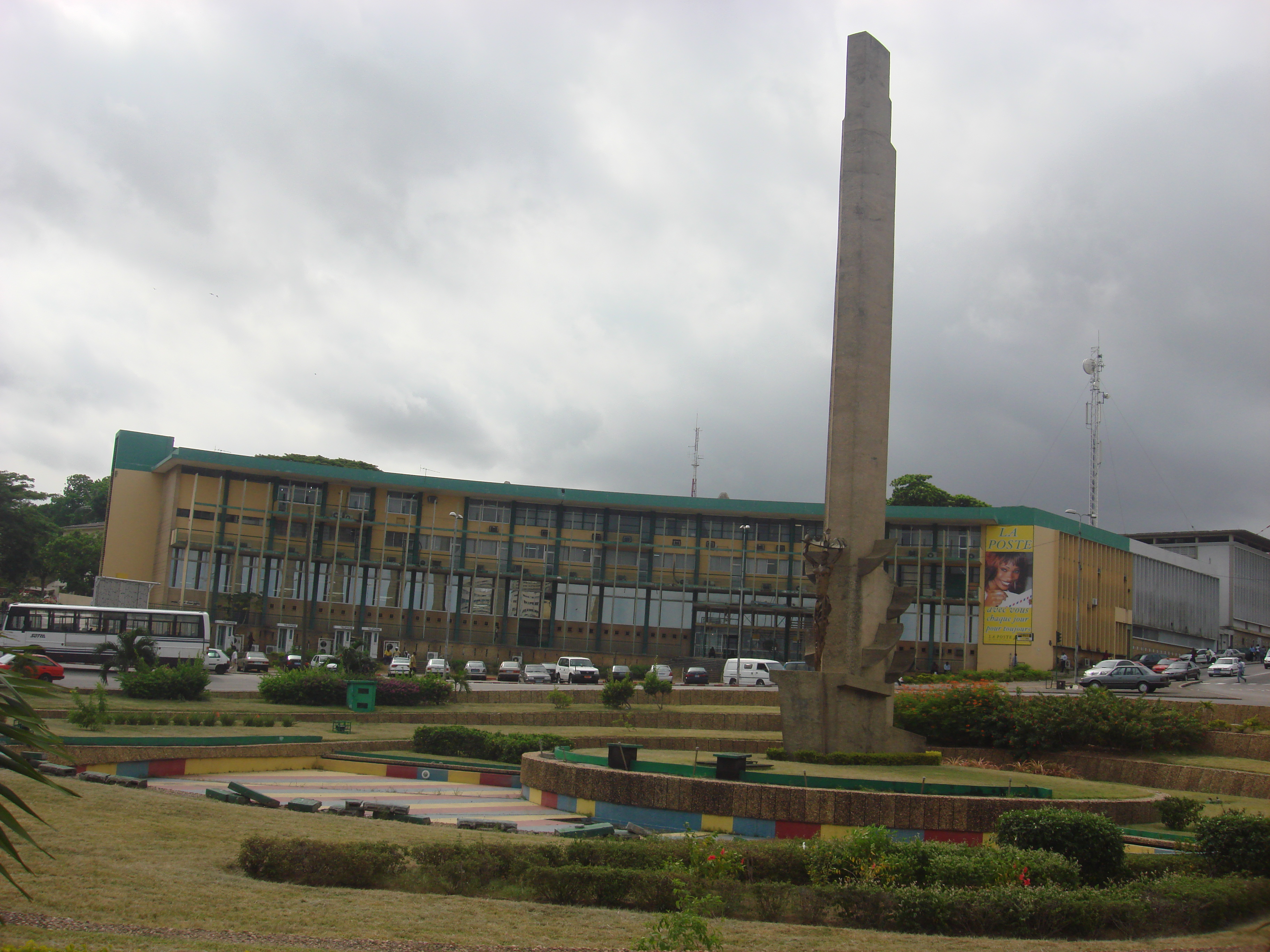
Post Office and Republic Plaza and sculpture, Plateau district, Abidjan, Côte d’Ivoire.

La Poste (French pronunciation: [la pɔst]) is the company responsible for postal service in Côte d'Ivoire. Côte d'Ivoire is a member of the West African Postal Conference.

The postal service is a Crown corporation that delivers mail (letters, maps, documents) and goods (packages and parcels), along with transferring money. It has 197 offices throughout the territory, 56 distribution centers in rural areas, two postal sorting centers, two centers of parcels, and a philatelic center.

The postal service has existed in Côte d'Ivoire since the nineteenth century. The postal service is the traditional means of communication in this country, but alternative methods of communication and transportation provided by private companies have developed rapidly in recent years.
