= Correo de Guatemala =

National post office of Guatemala

Correo de Guatemala S.A. is the national post office of Guatemala.
