= Correios de Timor-Leste =

Government agency responsible for postal service in Timor-Leste

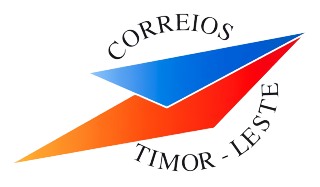
- Logo of Correios de Timor-Leste

Postal Authority overview
- Formed: 20 May 2002
- Type: Agency of the Government of Timor-Leste
- Headquarters: Dili, Timor-Leste
- Postal Authority executive: Director
- Website: http://www.correios.gov.tl/

Correios de Timor-Leste (Portuguese pronunciation: [kuˈʁɐjuʒ ðɨ tiˈmoɾ ˈlɛʃtɨ], lit. 'Post of Timor-Leste', abbr. CTL) is the government agency responsible for providing postal services in Timor-Leste.

== History ==
Correios de Timor-Leste became a member of the Universal Postal Union on 28 November 2003. The authority is also a member of the International Association of Portuguese-Speaking Communications (AICEP) from 2002.

== See also ==
- Postage stamps and postal history of Timor-Leste
- Communications in Timor-Leste
