= Correios da Guiné-Bissau =

Company responsible for postal service in Guinea-Bissau

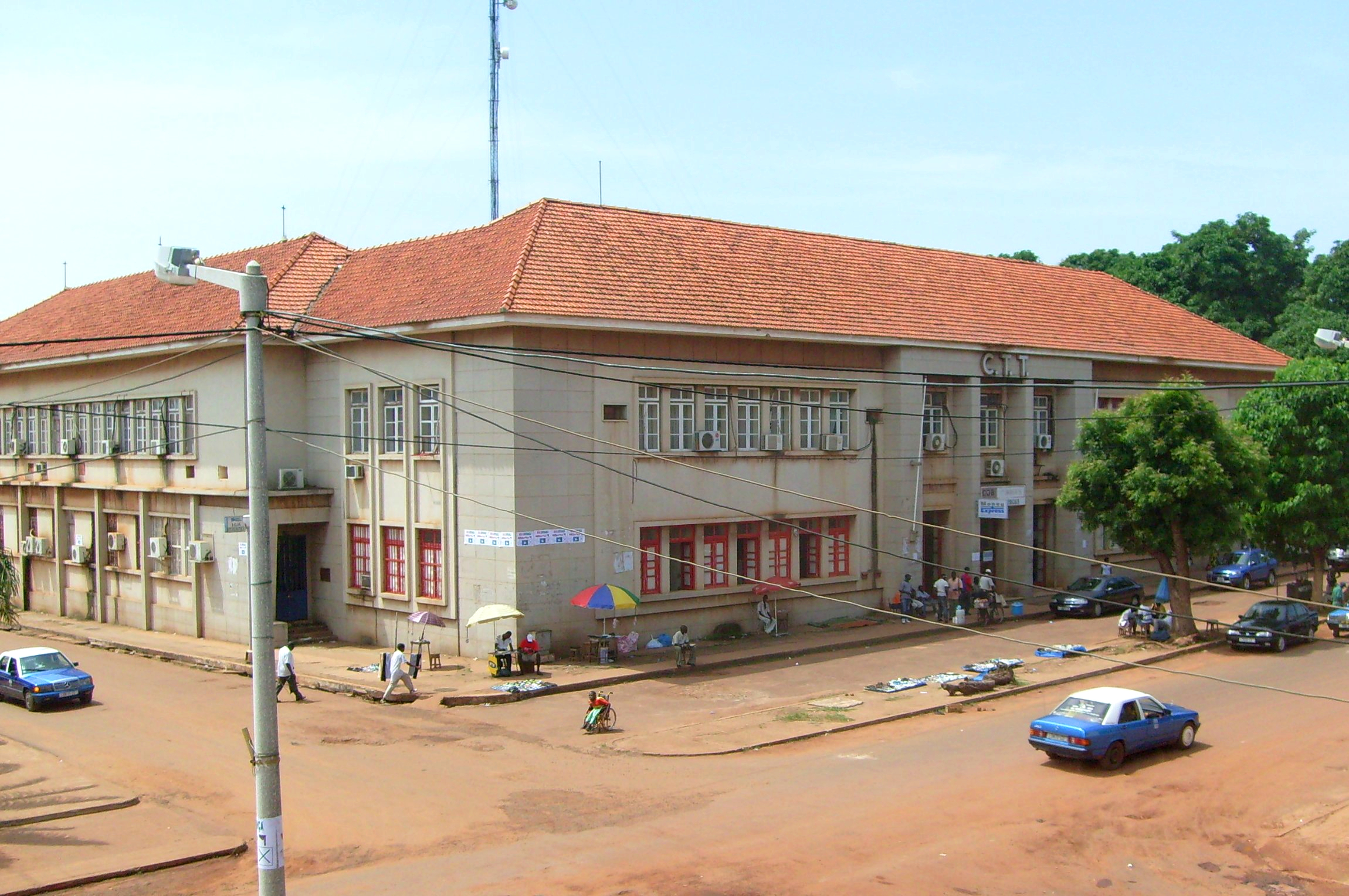
- Central post office building, Bissau, Guinea-Bissau

Agency overview
- Formed: 1973
- Jurisdiction: Guinea-Bissau
- Headquarters: Bissau

Correios da Guiné-Bissau (Portuguese pronunciation: [kuˈʁɐjuʒ ðɐ ɣiˈnɛ βiˈsaw], lit. 'Post of Guinea-Bissau') is the company responsible for postal service in Guinea-Bissau. It is a government-owned company whose headquarters is located in the former colonial building of Post Office, Telegraph and Telephone, in the capital city of Bissau. It was founded between 1973 and 1974 and joined the Universal Postal Union on 30 May 1974, and is a member of the International Association of Communications of Portuguese Expression.
