= 4-72 =

Colombian postal-system operator

Servicios Postales Nacionales

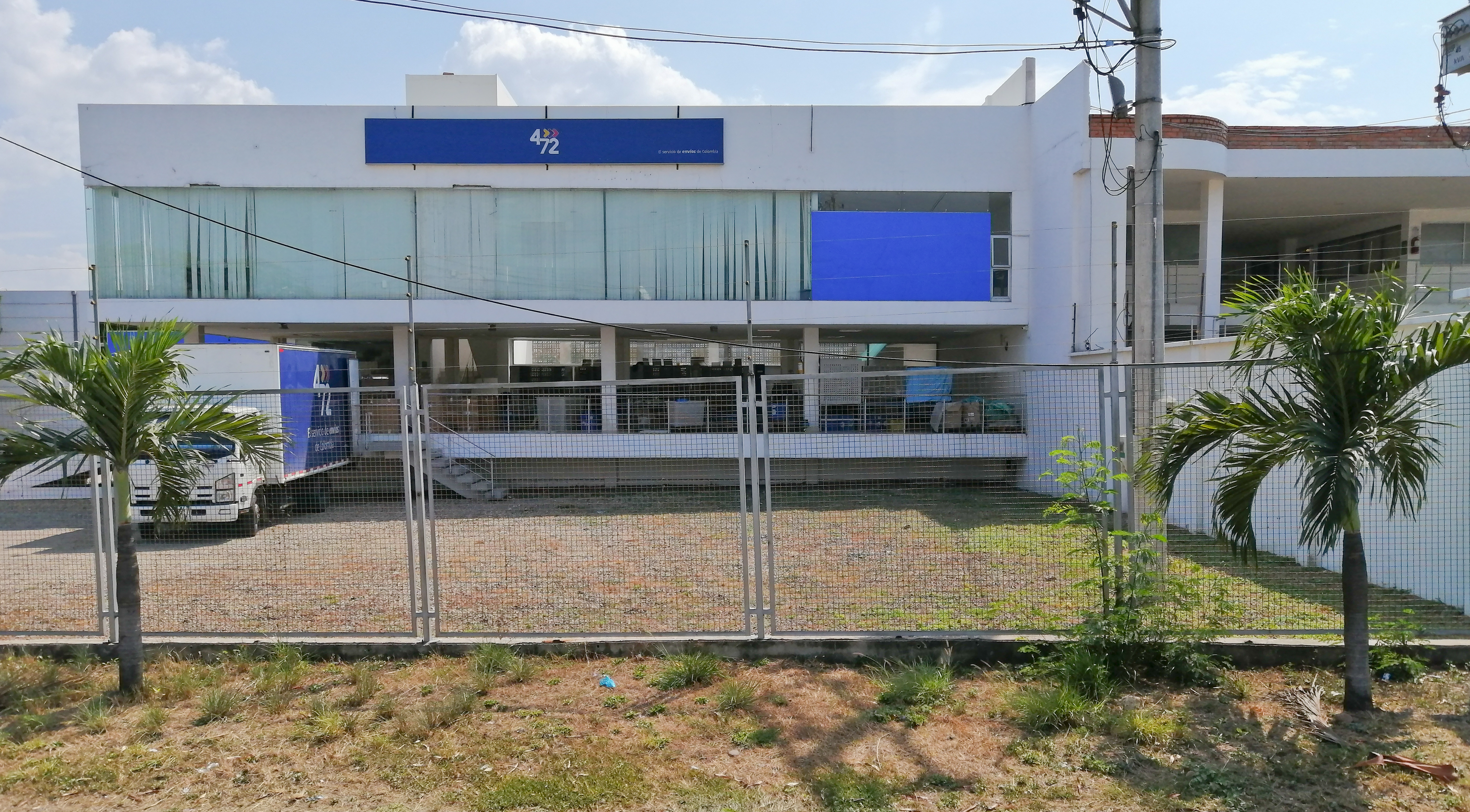
- Trade name: 4-72
- Type: Public company
- Industry: Postal service
- Predecessor: Adpostal
- Founded: 2006; 20 years ago
- Headquarters: Bogotá, Colombia
- Area served: Colombia
- Services: National and international postage, express courier, postal payment
- Website: 4-72.com.co

Flag of 4-72

Servicios Postales Nacionales is the company which operates as Colombia's official postal service under the name 4-72 (cuatro setenta y dos). The company assumed operations from the liquidated state company Adpostal in late 2006. In addition to providing both national and international mail service and express courier service, 4-72 also facilitates postal payment services, among other services. The name 4-72 derives from the simplified coordinates of the geographic center of Colombia (4°N, 72°W). It is associated with the Ministry of Information Technologies and Communications.
