= Correo Nacional Paraguayo =

National post office of Paraguay

- Industry: Postal service
- Headquarters: Paraguay

Correo Nacional Paraguayo is the national post office of Paraguay.

== See also ==
- Universal Postal Union
- Postal Union of the Americas, Spain and Portugal
- Agencia Boliviana de Correos
- Correos del Ecuador
- Saudi Post
- Syrian Post
- Oman Post
- Cyprus Postal Services
- O′zbekiston Pochtasi
- Tajik Post
- Vietnam Post Corporation
- Brunei Postal Services Department
- Maldives Post
- Philippine Postal Corporation
- Mongol Post
- North Korean Postal Service
