= Saigon Central Post Office =

Post office in Ho Chi Minh City, Vietnam

- Bưu điện Sài Gòn, Bưu điện Trung tâm Sài Gòn, Tòa nhà Bưu điện Thành phố Hồ Chí Minh
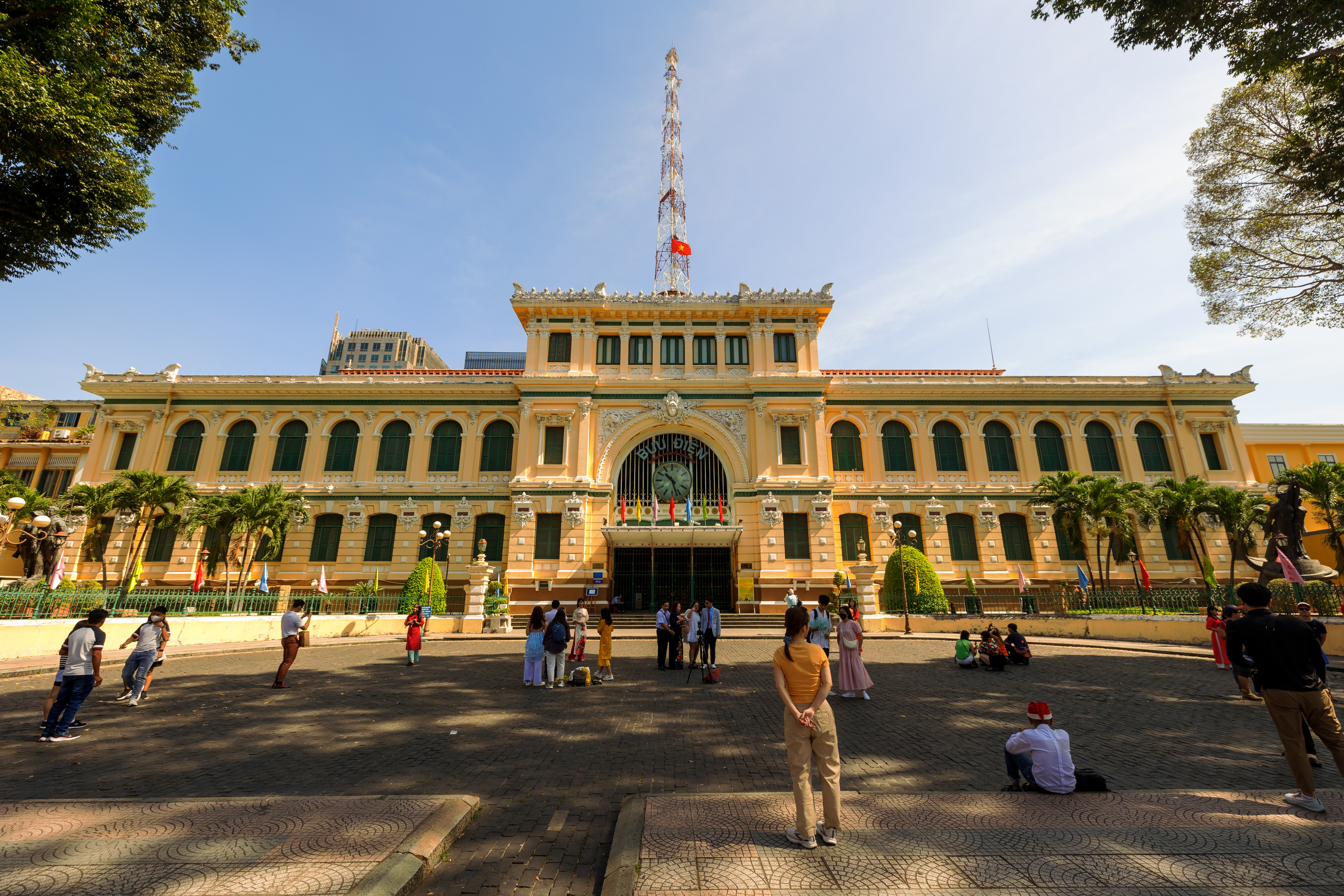
- Saigon Central Post Office in 2023
- Interactive map of the Saigon Central Post Office area
- Former names: Sở dây thép Sài Gòn (Vietnamese; in French colonial period)
- Alternative names: Saigon Post Office; Ho Chi Minh City Post Office Building

General information
- Type: Post Office
- Architectural style: Eclecticism
- Location: No.2 Paris Commune Square, Saigon, Ho Chi Minh City, Vietnam
- Coordinates: 10°46′48″N 106°42′00″E
- Years built: 1860-1863 (Former building); 1886-1891 (Current building)
- Renovated: 2014
- Renovation cost: US$200,000
- Owner: Vietnam Post

Design and construction
- Architects: Gustave Eiffel (Former building); Auguste Henri Vildieu, Foulhoux (Current building)

The Saigon Central Post Office (Vietnamese: Bưu điện Trung tâm Sài Gòn, French: Poste centrale de Saïgon) is a post office in Paris Commune Square, Saigon ward, Ho Chi Minh City, next to the Saigon Notre-Dame Basilica, the city's cathedral.

== History ==
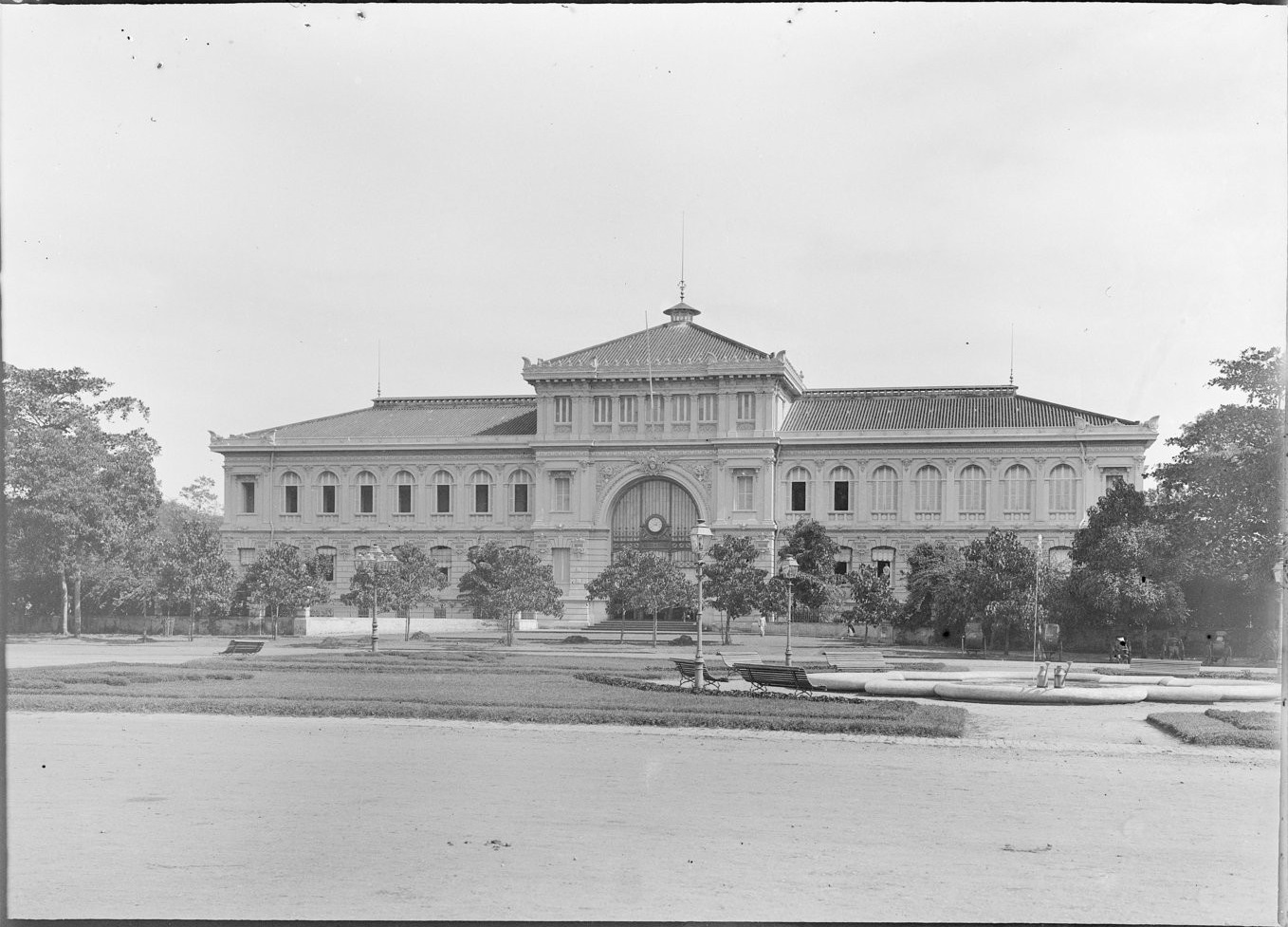
Saigon Central Post Office in 1895

The building was constructed when Vietnam was part of French Indochina in the late 19th century. It counts with Gothic, Renaissance and French influences. It was constructed between 1886 and 1891 and is now a tourist attraction.

It was designed by Alfred Foulhoux, but is often erroneously credited as being the work of Gustave Eiffel or a collaboration between Foulhoux and Hanoi-based Auguste Henri Vildieu. As translated by the historian Tim Doling, the journal Architecte constructeur: Revue du monde architectural et artistique of 15 September 1891 commented: “The inauguration the new Saigon Post Office, which was held on 14 July, had been postponed until the return of the Governor General. This monument, adorned with a most artistic façade, is particularly well laid out and well equipped for the different services to which it is intended; it does the greatest honour to the skill and talent of the distinguished Chief Architect of the Colony, M. Foulhoux.”

On the outside wall of the post office there are several plaques commemorating important scientists and engineers, who contributed to the development of the communication technologies of the time. These include Morse, Ampere, Volta, Ohm, and Faraday.

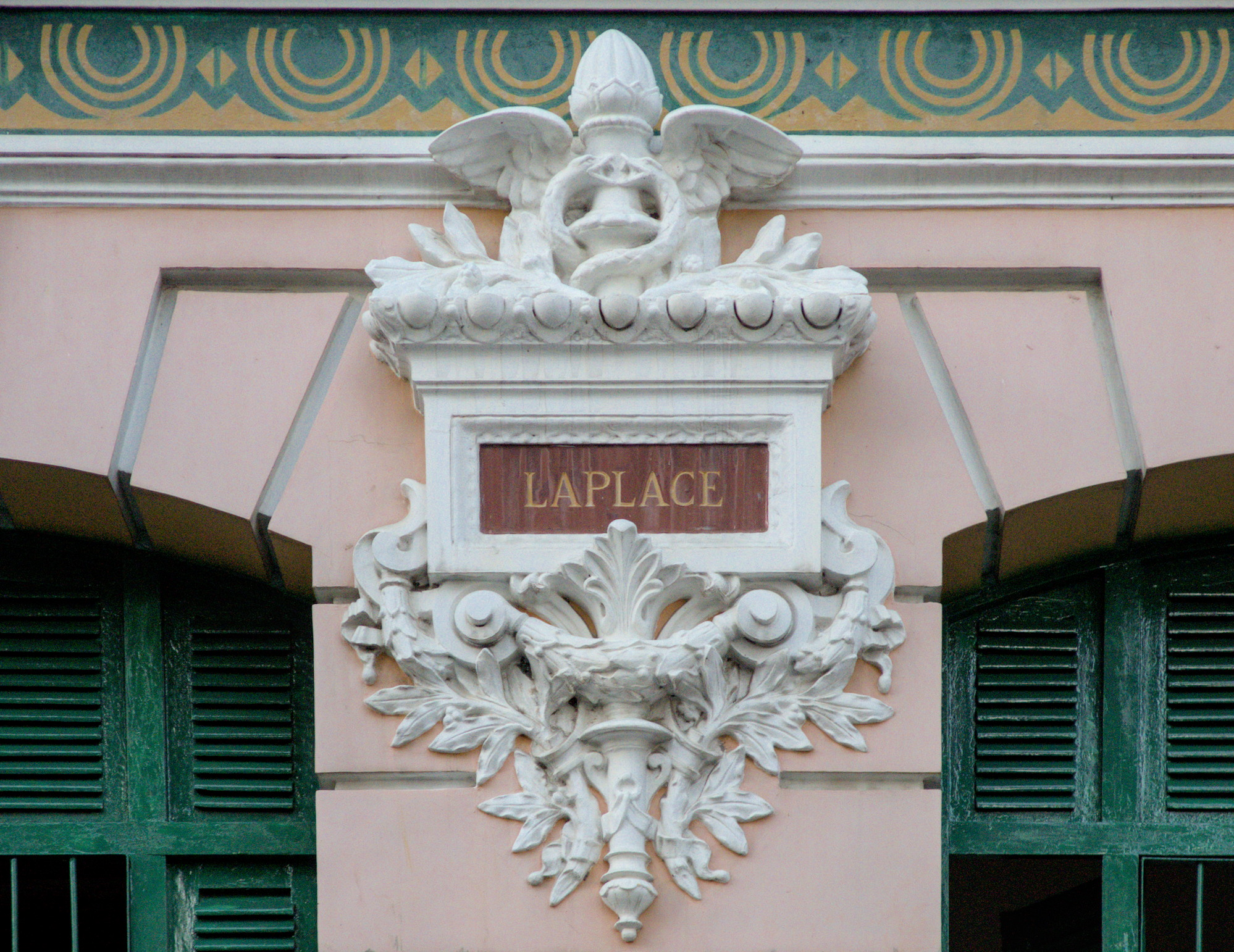
Plaque commemorating Laplace

Inside the Saigon Central Post office of special note are two painted maps that were created just after the post office was built, the first one located on the left side of the building is a map of Southern Vietnam and Cambodia titled Lignes telegraphiques du Sud Vietnam et Cambodge 1892 ("Telegraphic lines of Southern Vietnam and Cambodia 1892").

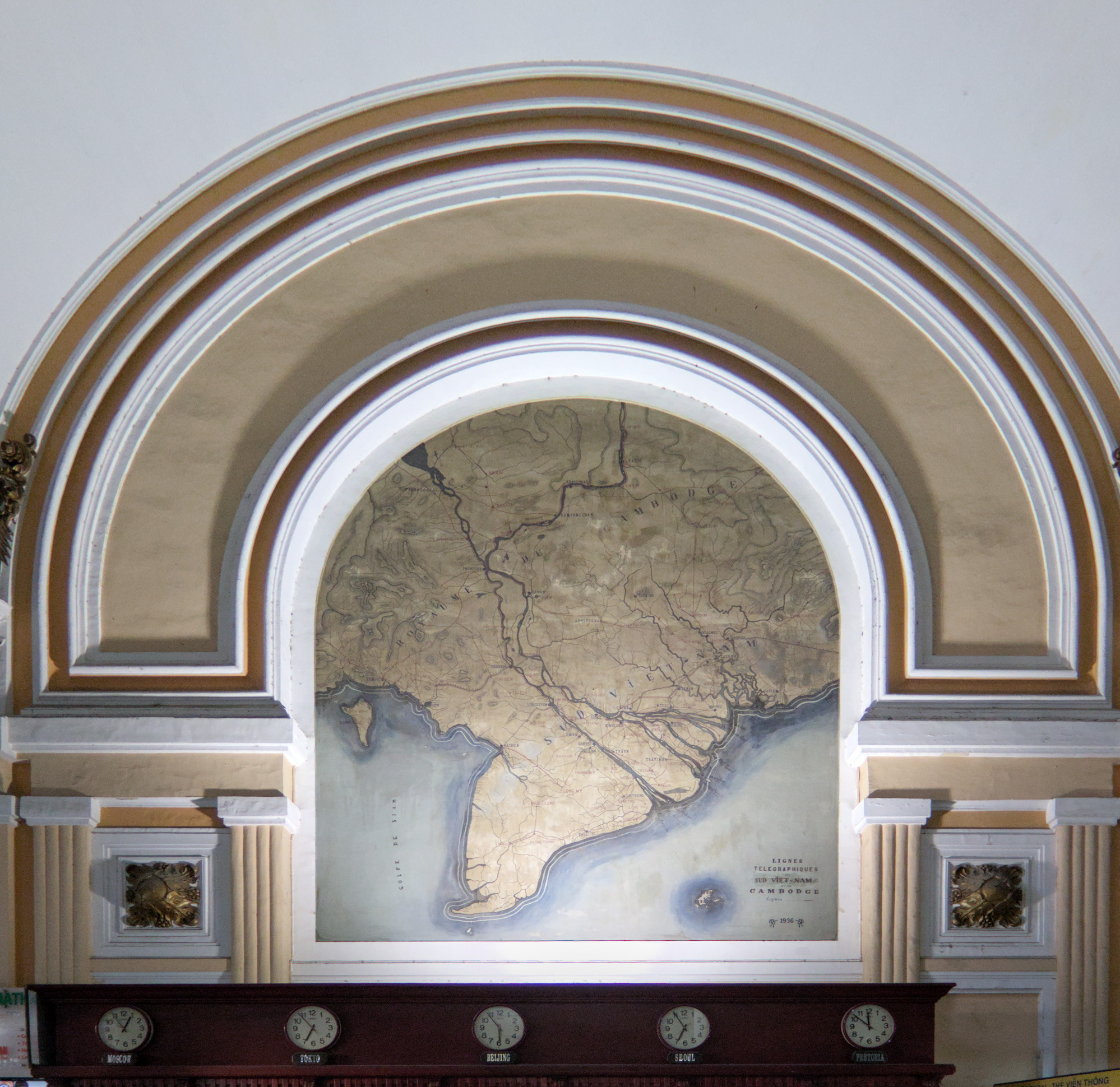
Map of South Vietnam and Cambodia showing telegraph lines

The second map of greater Saigon is titled Saigon et ses environs 1892 ("Saigon and its surroundings 1892").

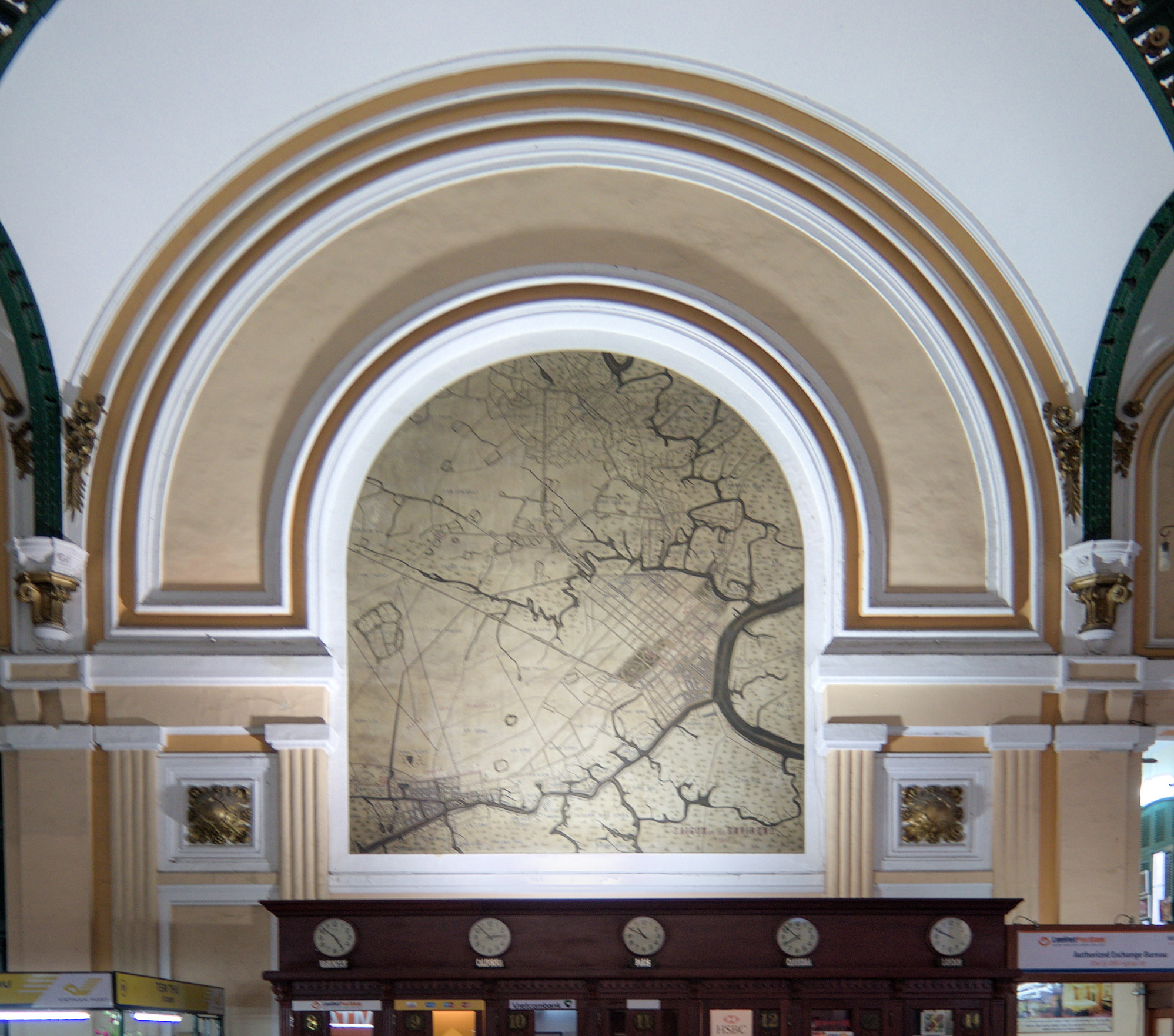
Map of Inner Saigon with its suburb in French Colonial period, bounded by the Saigon River (East) with Canal de Ceinture (West), Nhieu Loc–Thi Nghe Channel (North), and Bến Nghé Channel (South)

Dương Văn Ngộ, known for being the last public letter writer in Vietnam, worked at the office from 1990 to 2021.

== Gallery ==
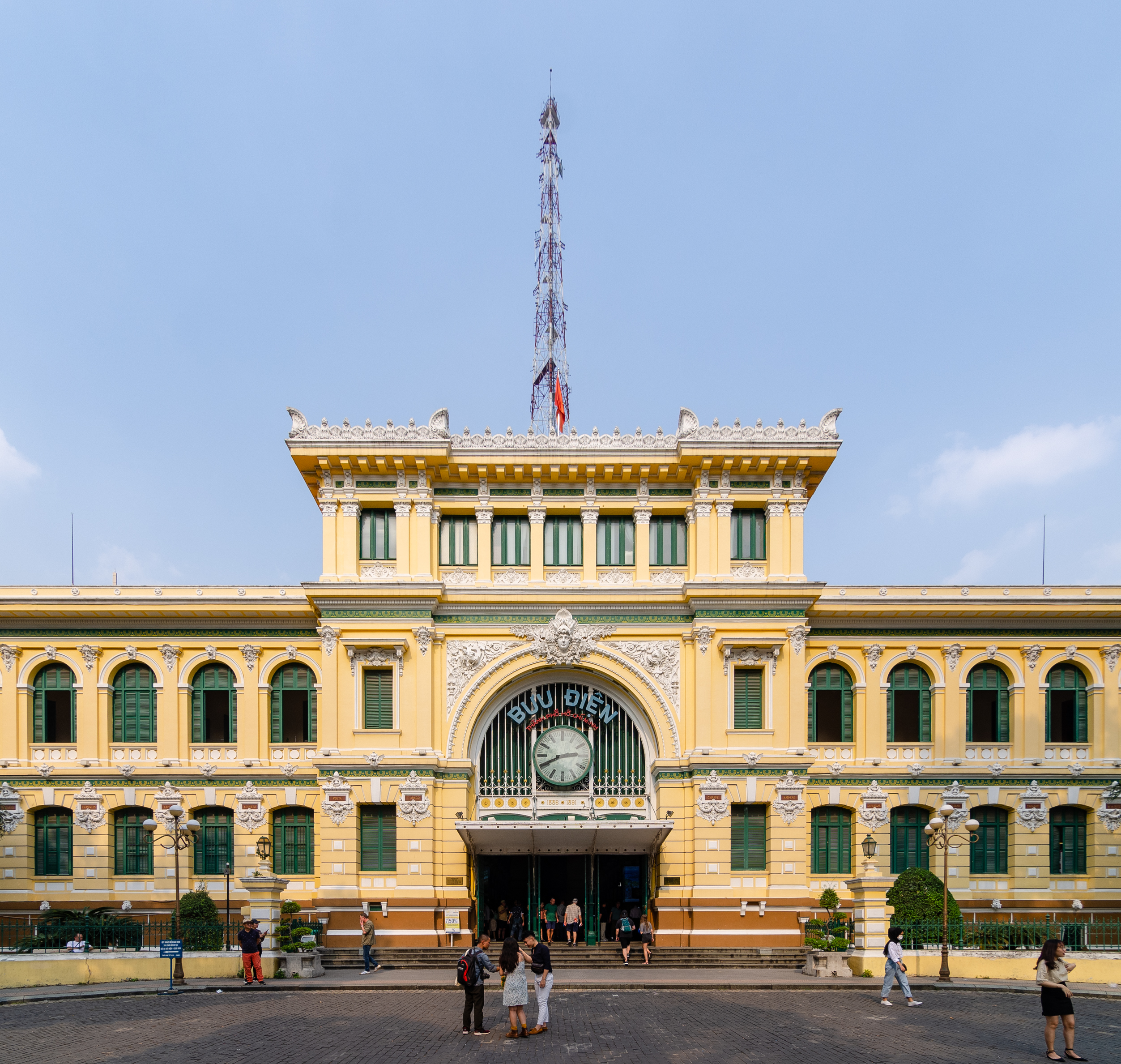
Front view of the Saigon Central Post Office with the VNPT BTS antenna behind

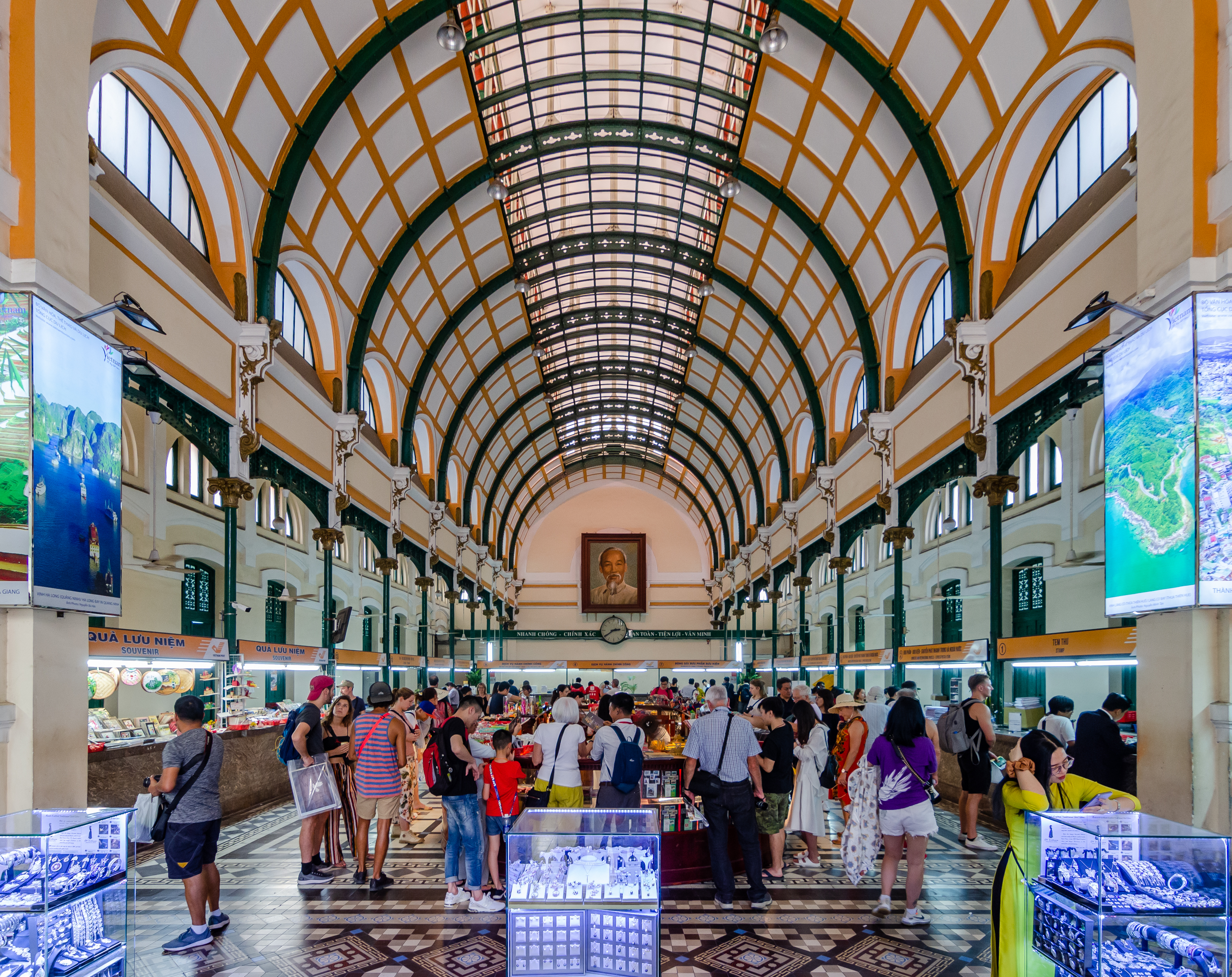
Interior view of the Saigon Central Post Office with portrait of Ho Chi Minh centrally on the back wall
