= Postal Union of the Americas, Spain and Portugal =

- Unión Postal de las Américas, España y Portugal; União Postal das Américas, Espanha e Portugal
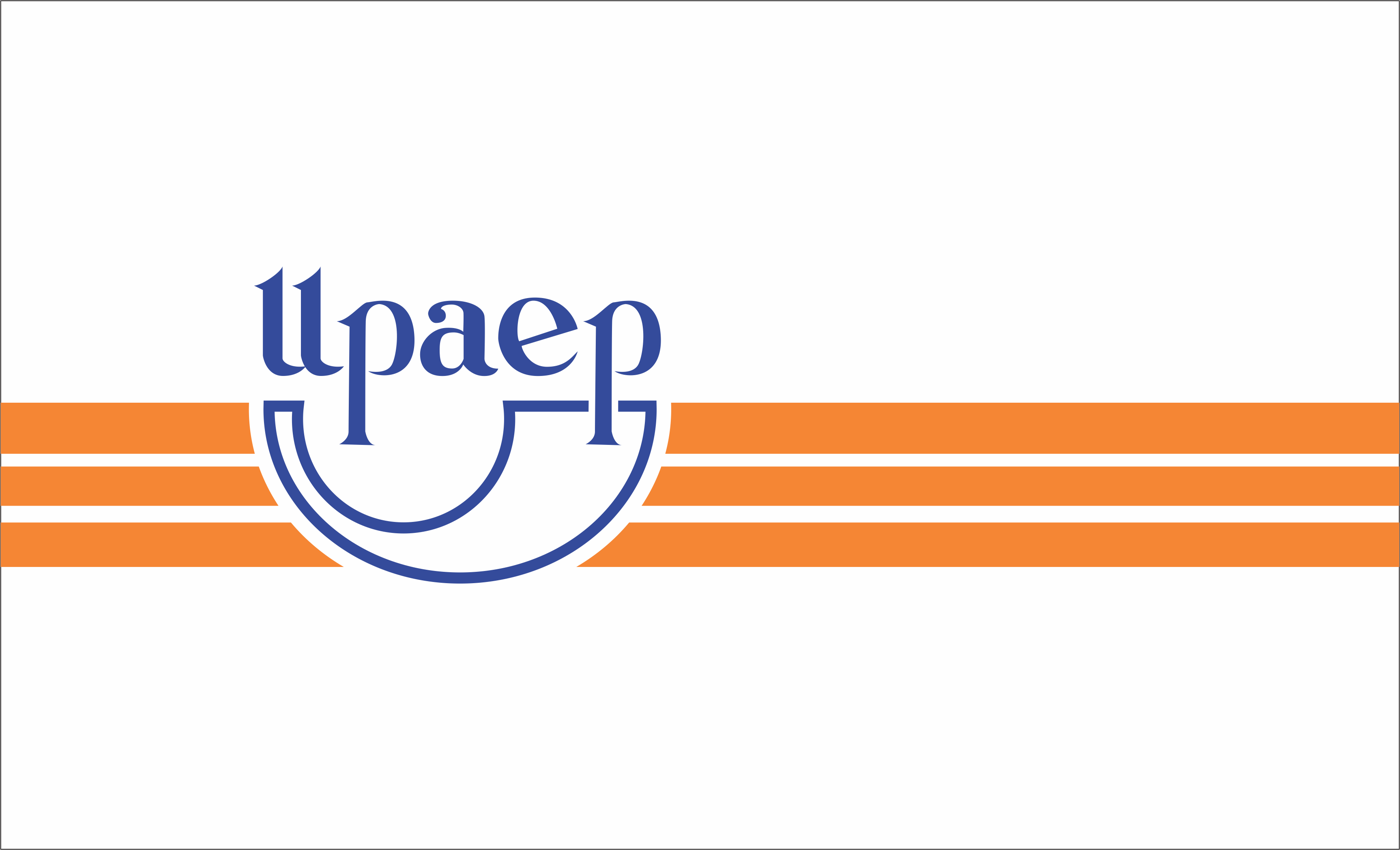
- Abbreviation: UPAEP
- Formation: 1911
- Founded at: Montevideo, Uruguay
- Type: Regional organization
- Headquarters: Montevideo, Uruguay
- Fields: Postal, mail
- Official language: Spanish and Portuguese (official languages)
- Secretary General: Roberto Cavanna
- Website: www.upaep.int

The Postal Union of the Americas, Spain and Portugal (Spanish: Unión Postal de las Américas, España y Portugal; Portuguese: União Postal das Américas, Espanha e Portugal; UPAEP) is a regional association of the postal authorities in Latin America, portions of the Caribbean, the United States, Canada, Spain, and Portugal, and is headquartered in Montevideo, Uruguay. It was founded in 1911 as a restricted union of the Universal Postal Union.

== History ==
The UPAEP's predecessors include:

- Unión Gran Colombiana (1838): Ecuador, Venezuela, and Colombia.
- Lima Convention (1848): Bolivia, Chile, Ecuador, Colombia, and Peru
- Lima Convention (1864): Bolivia, Colombia, Ecuador, Guatemala, El Salvador, Peru, and Venezuela
- Bolivarian Postal Agreement (1911): Bolivia, Colombia, Ecuador, Peru, and Venezuela

The South American Postal Congress (Spanish: Congreso Postal Sudamericano) was held on 8 January 1911 with delegates from Argentina, Bolivia, Brazil, Chile, Ecuador, Paraguay, Peru, Uruguay, and Venezuela. The union was later renamed the Panamerican Postal Congress (Spanish: Congreso Postal Panamericano) in 1926, the American-Spanish Postal Congress (Spanish: Congreso Postal Americoespañol) in 1936, the Postal Union of the Americas and Spain (Spanish: Unión Postal de las Américas y España) in 1966, and the Postal Union of the Americas, Spain and Portugal in 1990.

== Member countries ==
The Postal Union of the Americas, Spain and Portugal consists of the following member postal administrations:

- Argentina (Correo Argentino) (1911)
- Aruba (Post Aruba) (1993)
- Bolivia (Empresa de Correos de Bolivia) (1911)
- Brazil (Correios) (1911)
- Canada (Canada Post) (1931)
- Chile (Correos de Chile) (1911)
- Colombia (Servicios Postales Nacionales) (1911)
- Costa Rica (Correos de Costa Rica) (1921)
- Cuba (Empresa de Correos de Cuba) (1921)
- Curaçao (CPost International) (1993)
- Dominican Republic (Instituto Postal Dominicano) (1921)
- Ecuador (Correos del Ecuador) (1911)
- El Salvador (General Postal Directorate) (1921)
- Guatemala (Correo de Guatemala) (1921)
- Haiti (Post of Haiti) (1931)
- Honduras (Honducor) (1926)
- Mexico (Correos de México) (1921)
- Nicaragua (Nicaraguan Postal Service) (1921)
- Panama (Correos y Telégrafos Nacionales de Panamá) (1921)
- Paraguay (Correo Nacional Paraguayo) (1911)
- Peru (Serpost) (1911)
- Portugal (Correios de Portugal) (1990)
- Sint Maarten (Postal Services Sint Maarten) (2014)
- Spain (Correos) (1926)
- Suriname (Surinaams Postbedrijf) (1978)
- United States (United States Postal Service) (1921)
- Uruguay (Correo Uruguayo) (1911)
- Venezuela (IPOSTEL) (1911)

== See also ==
- Ibero-America
- Caribbean Postal Union
- European Conference of Postal and Telecommunications Administrations (CEPT)
- Universal Postal Union
- List of telecommunications regulatory bodies
