= UPAEP =

UPAEP may refer to:

- Postal Union of the Americas, Spain and Portugal
- Universidad Popular Autónoma del Estado de Puebla
