= Dương Văn Ngộ =

Vietnamese postal worker (1930–2023)

- Born: 3 March 1930; District 6, Saigon, French Indochina
- Died: 1 August 2023 (aged 93)
- Known for: Being the longest-serving and last public letter writer and translator employed by VNPT
- Children: 6

Dương Văn Ngộ (Vietnamese: [jɨ̄əŋ vāŋ ŋôwˀ]; 3 March 1930 – 1 August 2023) was a Vietnamese postal worker and polyglot public letter writer known for being the longest-serving and last public letter writer and translator in Vietnam. During his three decades of work as a letter-writer, Ngộ wrote thousands of letters. He retired in 2021 from his desk in the Saigon Central Post Office following 70 years of work in the Vietnamese postal service.

== Early life and career ==
I think of this as my life, and only death can stop me from thinking about it.

– Dương Văn Ngộ on his profession

Ngộ was born on 3 March 1930 in Phú Lâm, District 6, Saigon (now Ho Chi Minh City) as the fifth of six children in a family with Hoa (Vietnamese Chinese) ancestry. His father worked in the trades while his mother did not hold a steady job, instead mending sacks on an ad hoc basis for money. In 1942, Ngộ became one of the few impoverished students accepted to the prestigious Petrus Ký High School (now Lê Hồng Phong High School For The Gifted). At 16 years old, he became interested in the mail and began working at the Thị Nghè district post office. Starting in 1948, he became an official employee at the Saigon Central Post Office, sorting letters into boxes. Later, Ngộ would take on other roles, and was temporarily transferred to the Ministry of Transport and Post. When he was 36, the post office arranged for him to learn English and French, although Ngộ claims his French proficiency dates to an excellent primary school education. For English education, the post office's board of directors organized special tutoring from an American pilot at the Vietnamese-American Association.

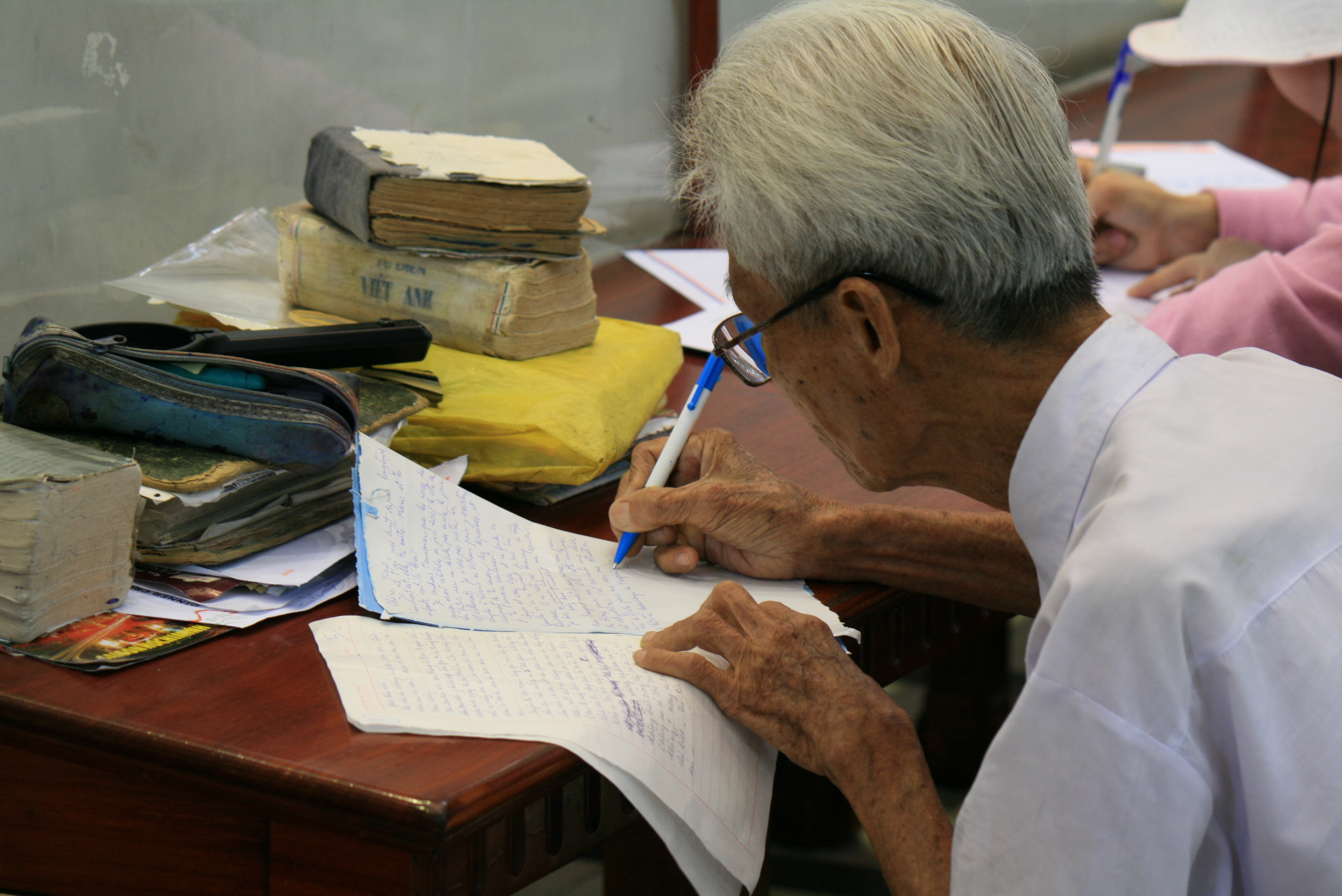
Ngộ at his post in April 2011

Although eligible to retire and collect a pension in 1990, Ngộ instead requested assignment to the public letter-writing service (also known as letters for hire), which had only six people at the time. Eventually, all of the other writers died, leaving only Ngộ. He convinced the post office to give him a desk at the end of the hall where he could offer his services. Each weekday, Ngộ worked from 8 in the morning to 3:30 in the afternoon writing letters and providing tourist information. He was commonly seen with a black bag, which contained various materials including dictionaries for his work.

Ngộ was able to parse letters written in German and could read and write them in French, English, and his native Vietnamese. Since 1990, he had written letters to recipients worldwide. Ngộ saw his profession as a labor of love and a way to publicize and promote Vietnam. While the shift to digital telecommunications had reduced his customer base, Ngộ remained popular with visitors and tourists, many of whom wanted to take pictures with him.

In 2021, he was forced to retire due to his age and weakening senses, although he still attempted to sneak in and continue working.

== Personal life ==
Ngộ married a woman also born in 1930. They had six children: two sons and four daughters. One daughter has an intellectual disorder, and relies on her elder sister for care. He boasted that all of his children performed well in their studies.

Ngộ died on 1 August 2023, at the age of 93.

== Recognition ==
Ngộ gained various titles and nicknames from the Vietnamese press for his work and was officially recognized by the Vietnam Records Book Center as the longest-serving public letter writer in 2009. Afterwards, many people came to the post office to see him in action, noting that he was the last writer in Saigon and then Vietnam in general. In 2016, he received a prize and 20 million VND from the Kova Priza Committee. He later became featured in international media outlets. He met with Herman Van Rompuy, then-President of the European Council, in 2012.

He has been described as a hallmark of the Saigon Central Post Office.
