= Paris Commune Square =

Square in Ho Chi Minh City, Vietnam

- City square
- Công trường Công xã Paris
- Former names: Place Pigneau de Béhaine, Hòa Bình Square, John F. Kennedy Square
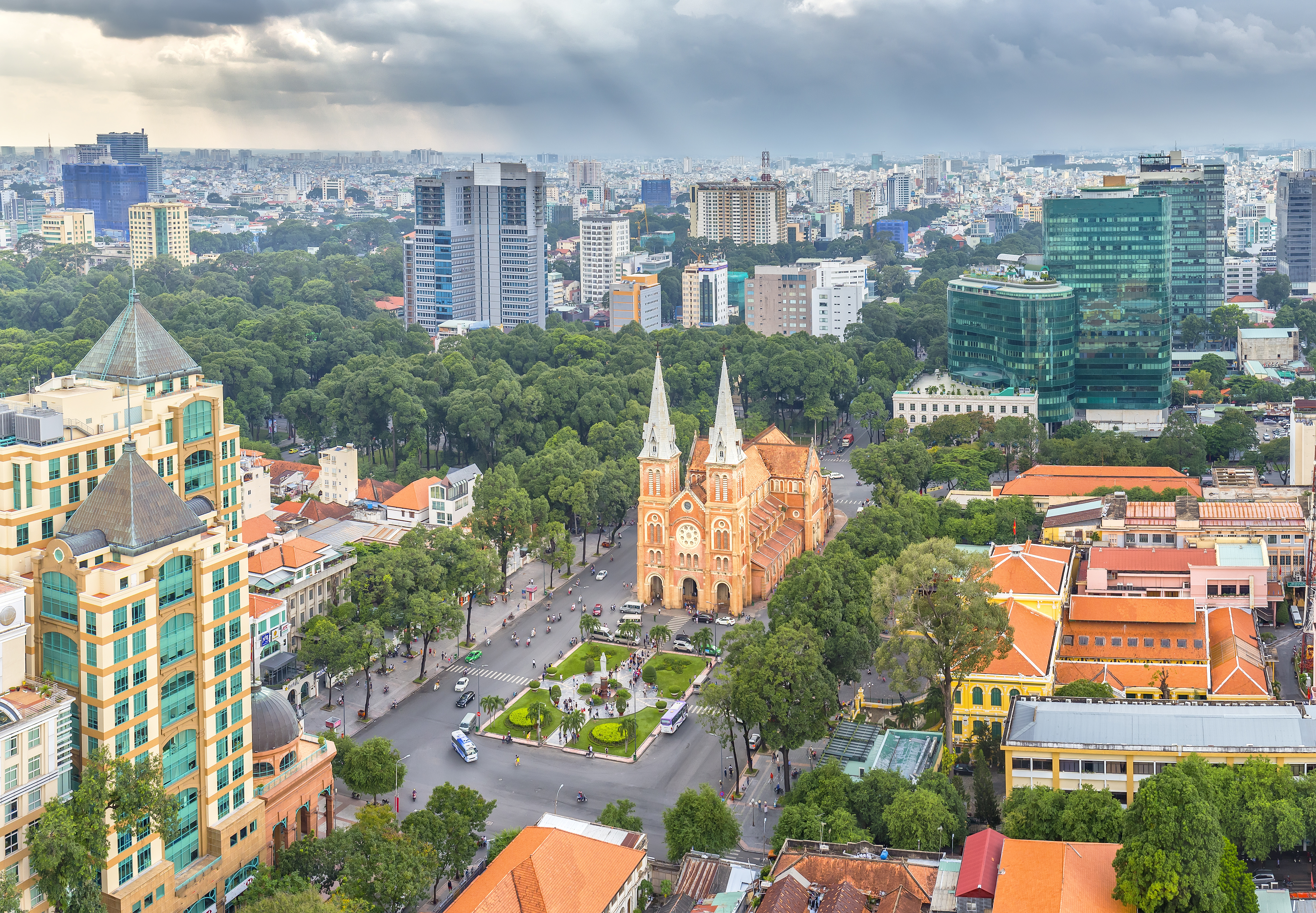
- Paris Commune Square in 2016, seen from Vincom Center Đồng Khởi
- Dedicated to: Paris Commune (1789–1795)
- Owner: Ho Chi Minh City
- Location: Saigon, Ho Chi Minh City
- Interactive map of Paris Commune Square
- Coordinates: 10°46′46″N 106°41′58″E

Paris Commune Square (Vietnamese: Công trường Công xã Paris) is a small square and roundabout located in Saigon ward, Ho Chi Minh City, Vietnam. It lies between Lê Duẩn Boulevard and Nguyễn Du Street and surrounds the Notre-Dame Cathedral Basilica of Saigon. This is also the starting point of the famous Đồng Khởi Street. The square is surrounded by two remarkable architectural works: Notre-Dame Cathedral and Central Post Office, and as both the construction are located here, the square is also marked as the city's kilometre zero.

== History ==
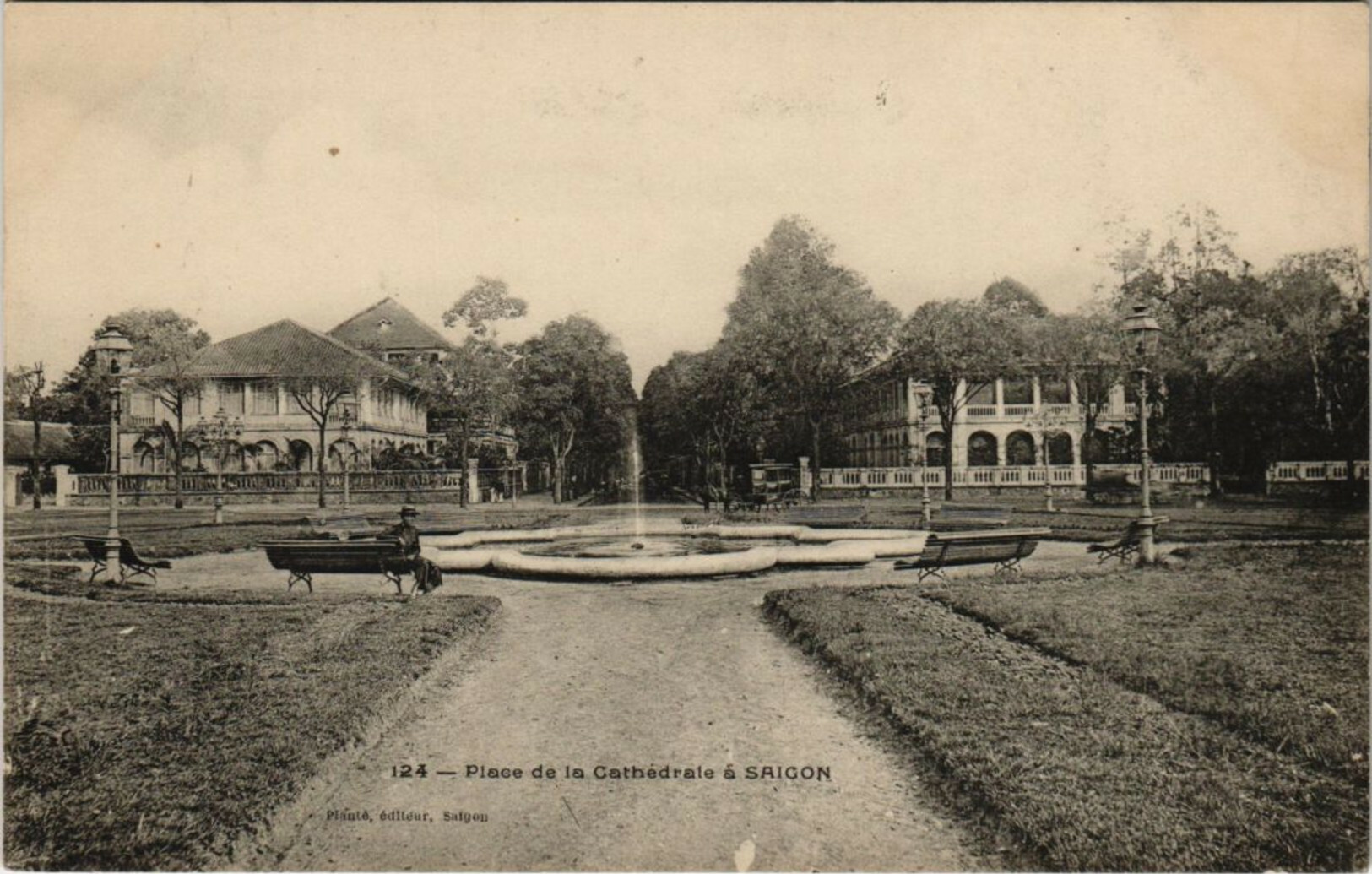
A small fountain initially occupied the site of the future statue in the garden's center

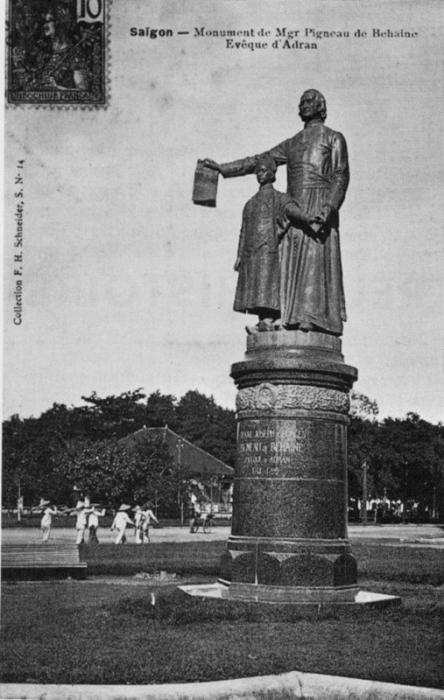
Bronze statue of Pigneau de Béhaine and Prince Cảnh on the square, circa 1900s

The square was originally named Place de la Cathédrale (roughly translated "Cathedral Square") dated back to the French colonial period. In 1903, the colonial government erected a bronze statue of French Catholic priest Pierre Pigneau de Béhaine and juvenile Prince Nguyễn Phúc Cảnh in the center of the garden in front of the cathedral, and the square is thus known as Place Pigneau de Béhaine. It was brought down in October 1945 leaving behind an empty statue pedestal. There was no statue on the site until 1959 under the First Republic of Vietnam, when a new statue of Our Lady of Peace (Vietnamese: Tượng Đức Bà Hòa Bình) was erected in honor of the Blessed Virgin Mary. The square itself was called Hòa Bình Square (Vietnamese: Công trường Hòa Bình, literally "Peace Square"). In May 1964, the South Vietnamese government renamed it President John F. Kennedy Square (Vietnamese: Công trường Tổng thống John F. Kennedy) honoring the same name assassinated U.S. President. After the Fall of Saigon, the square was renamed Công trường Công xã Paris (literally means "Paris Commune Square") by the Provisional Revolutionary Government.

== Surrounding landmarks ==
List of buildings surround the square, the buildings does not have the street name is bearing the square as its address

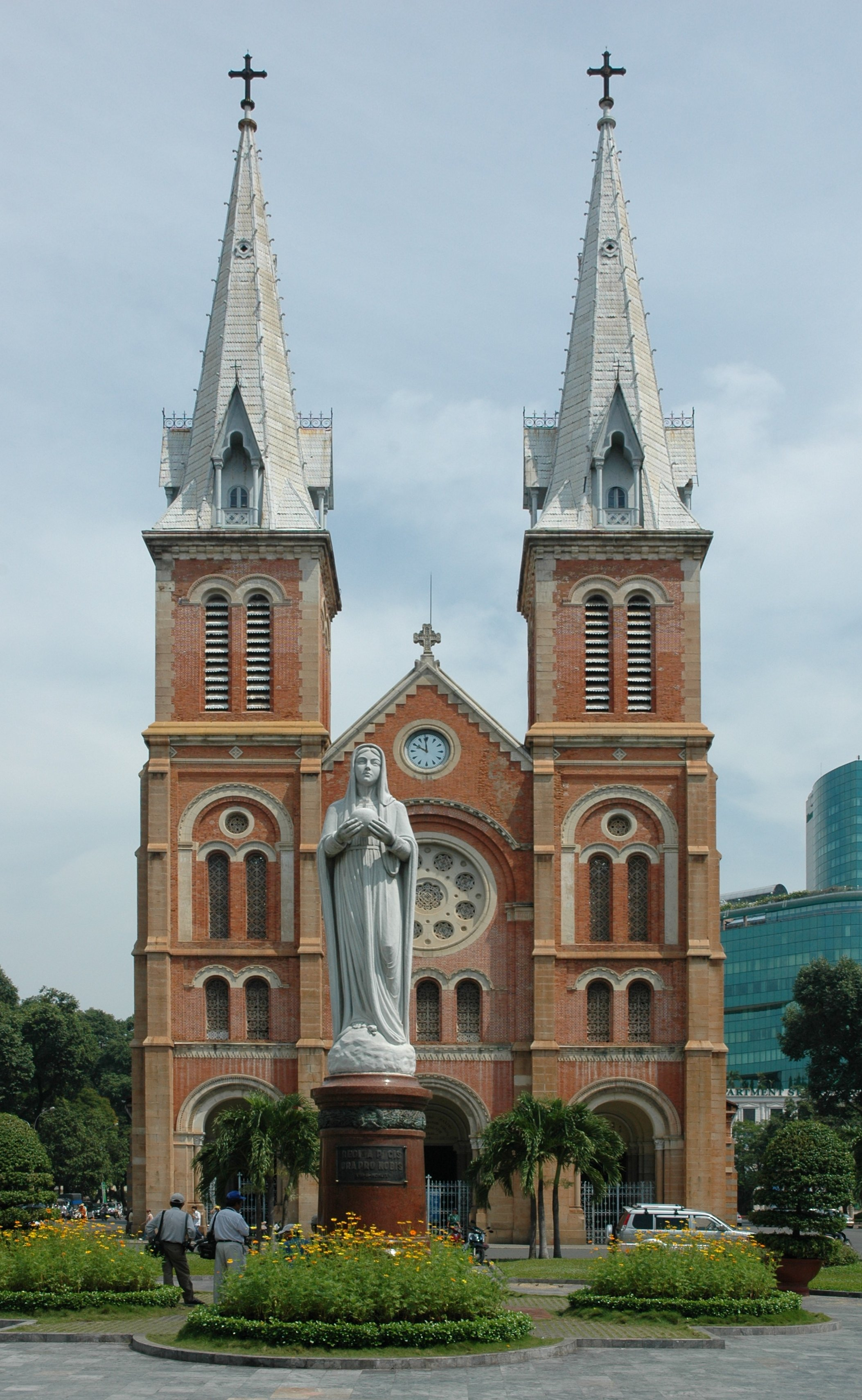
Notre-Dame Cathedral Basilica of Saigon, No.1

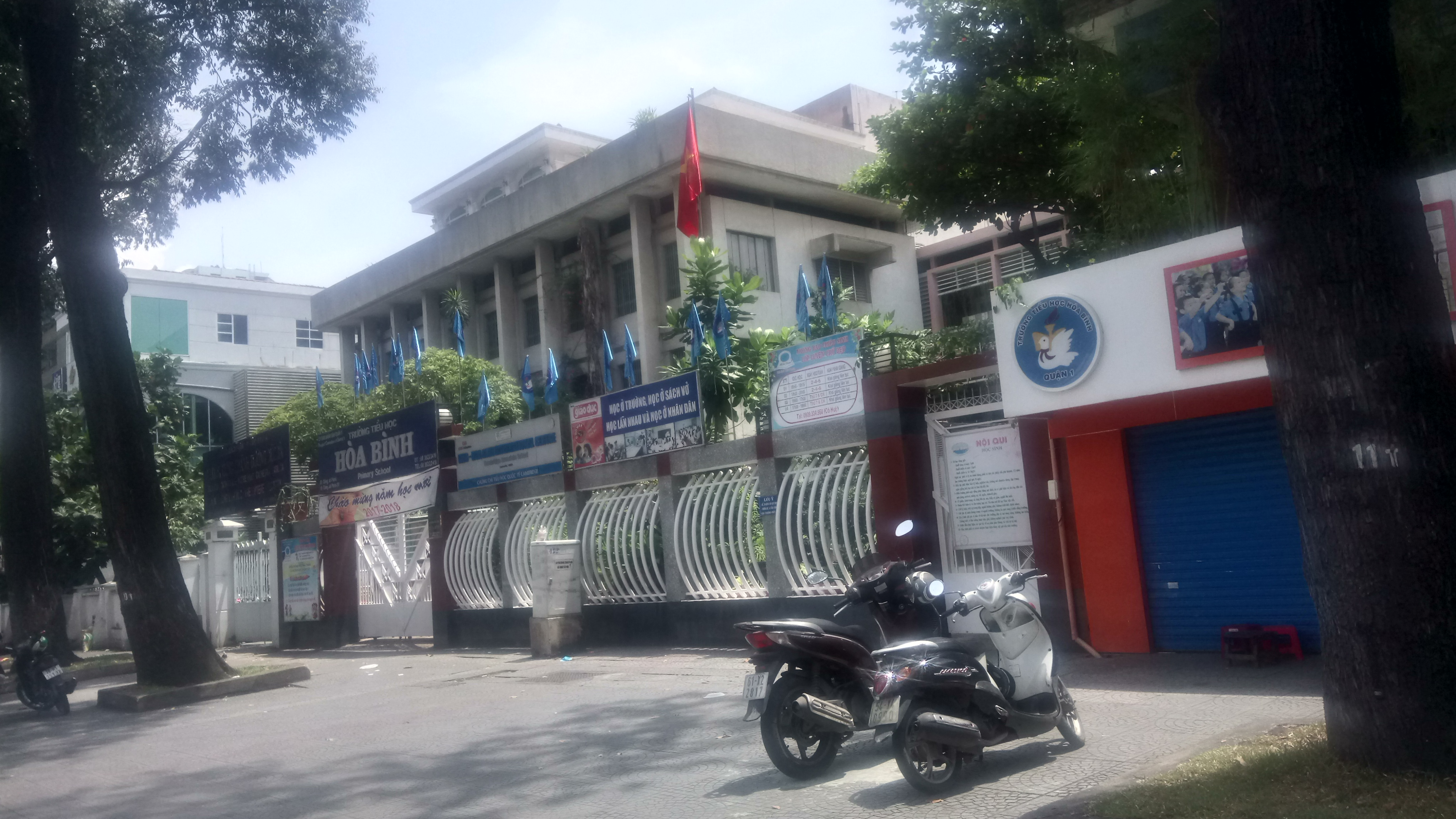
Hòa Bình Primary School with Đức Bà Hòa Bình - Catholic Bookstore, No.1

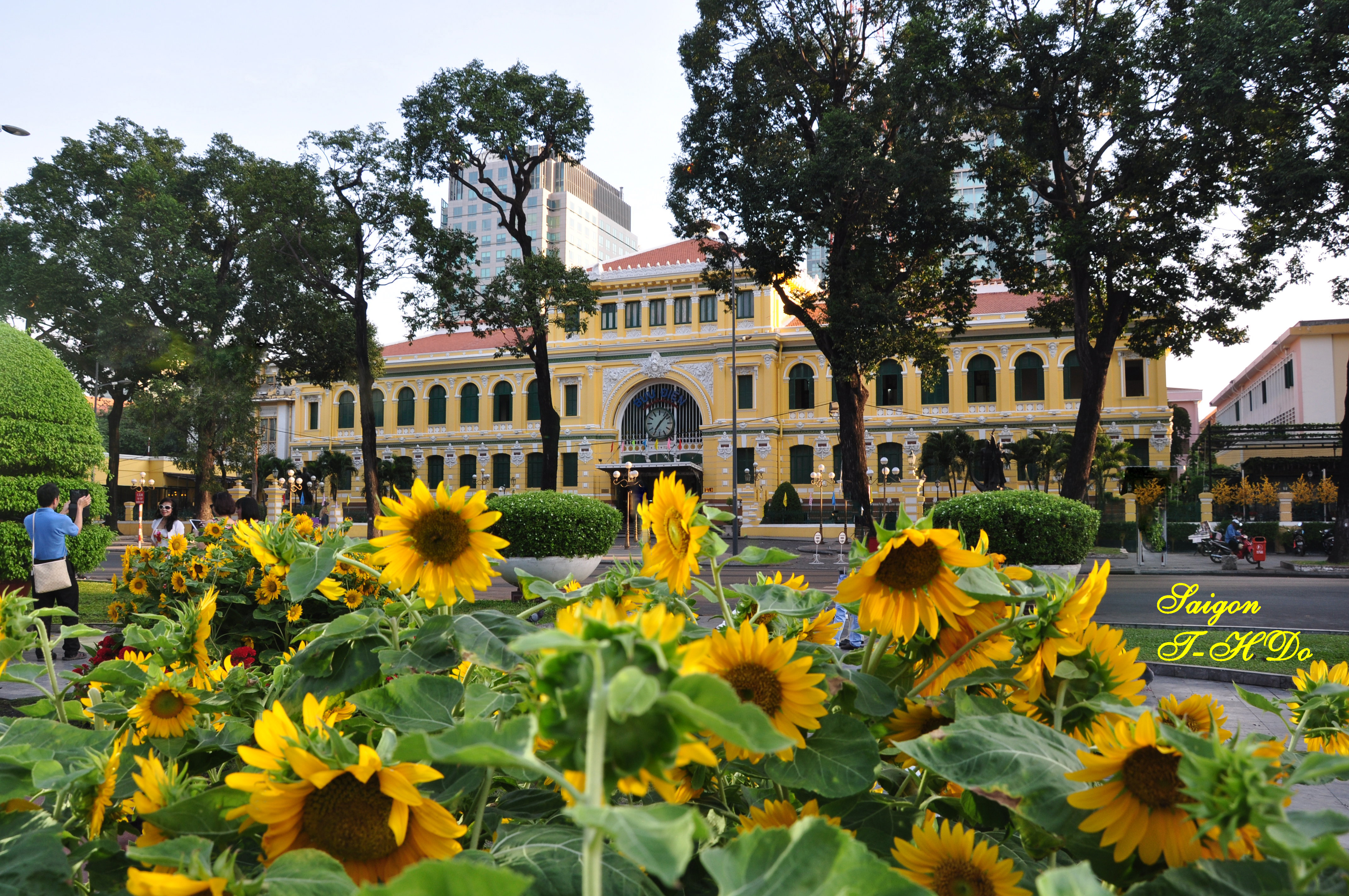
Saigon Central Post Office, No.2

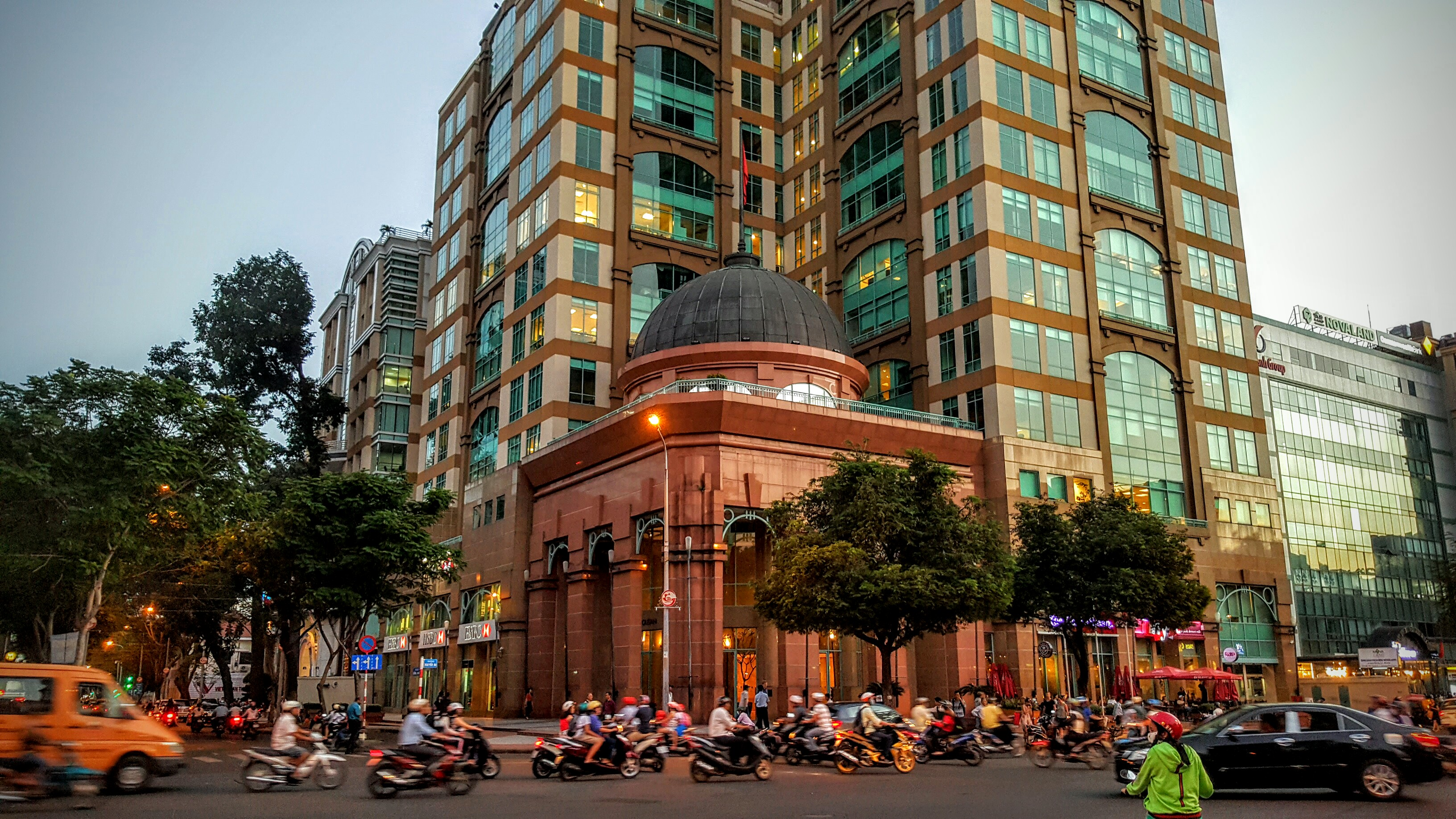
Metropolitan Building, 235 Đồng Khởi and Han Nam - NovaLand Office Building, 65 Nguyễn Du Building

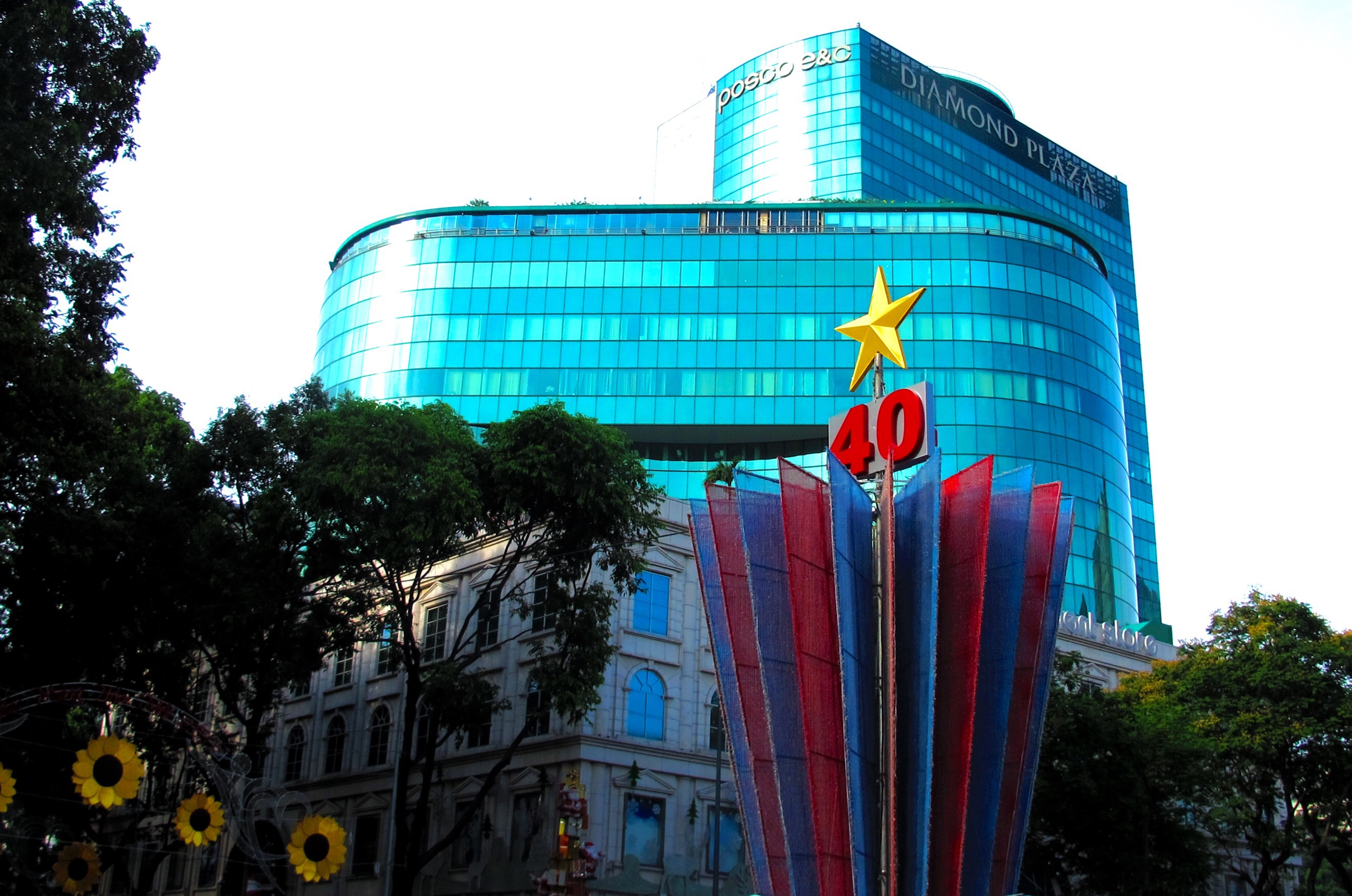
Diamond Plaza, 34 Lê Duẩn Boulevard and the roundabout behind the Saigon Notre Dame

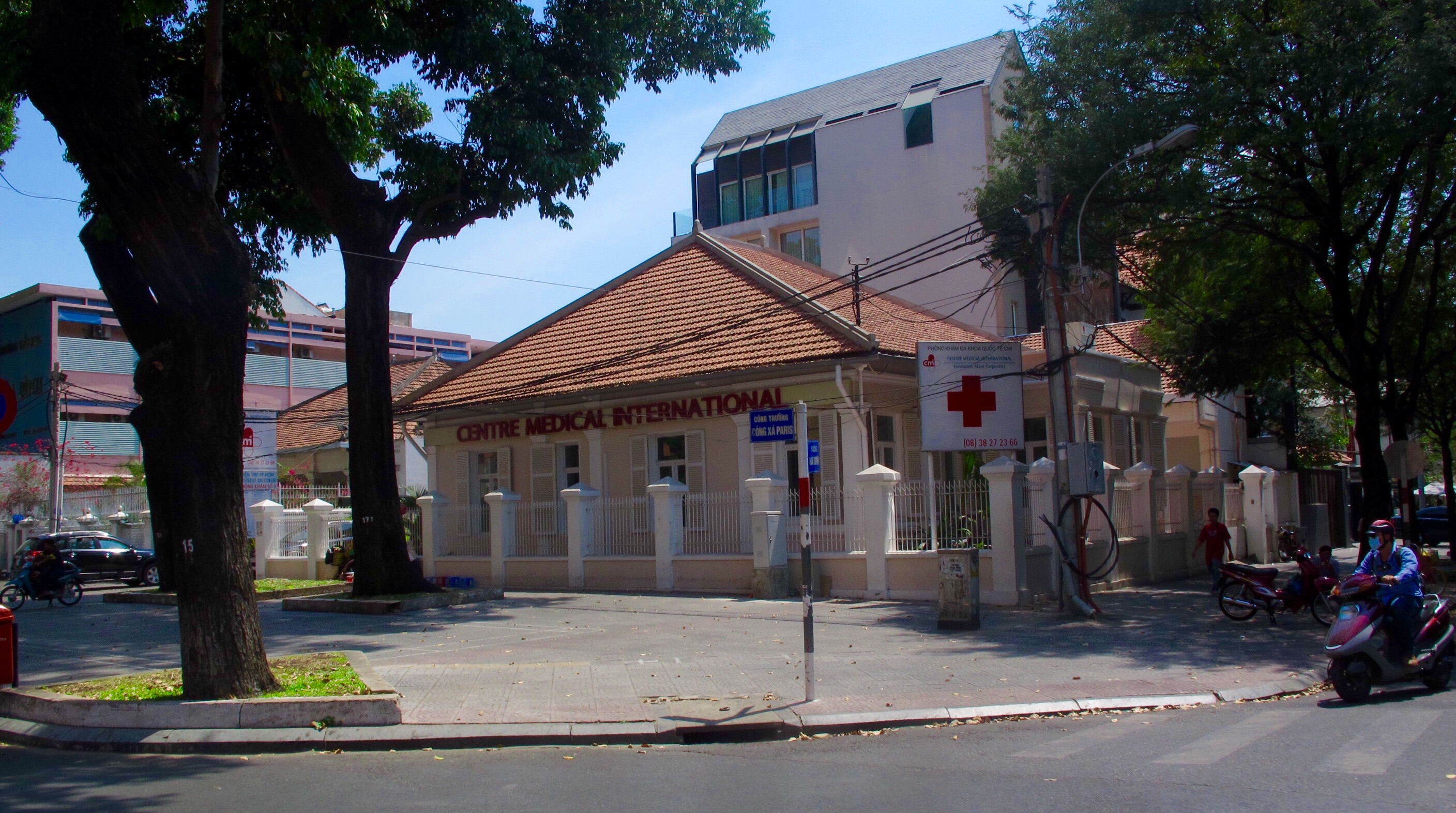
No.1 Hàn Thuyên Mansion, formerly Centre Médical International

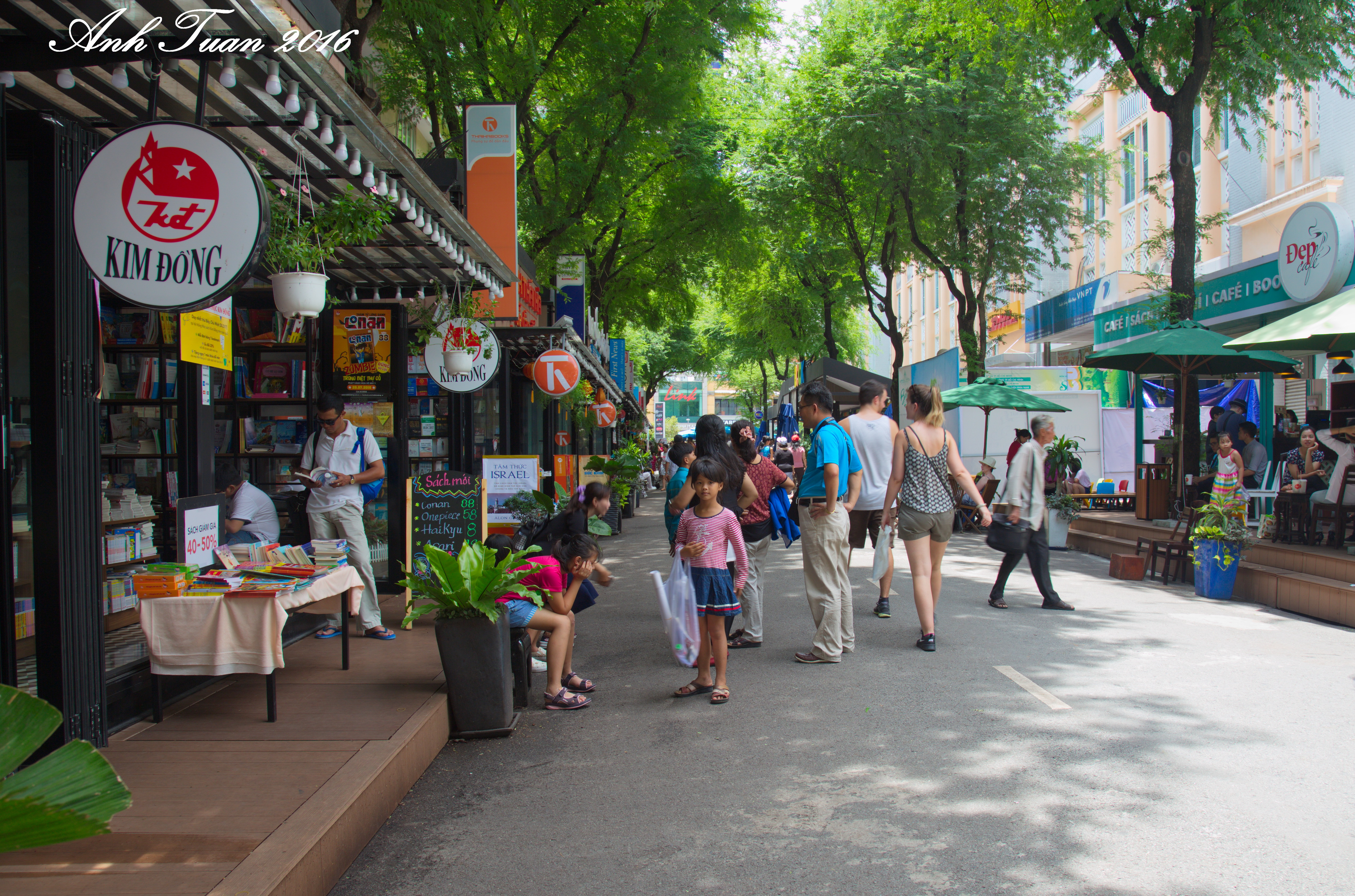
Nguyễn Văn Bình Street - Main Street Book of Ho Chi Minh City
