= CTT Correios de Portugal =

National postal service company of Portugal

CTT – Correios de Portugal, S.A.
- CTT's current logo since March 2020.
- Type: Sociedade Anónima
- Traded as: Euronext Lisbon: CTT; PSI-20 component
- ISIN: PTCTT0AM0001
- Industry: Postal services, Courier
- Founded: 6 November 1520; 505 years ago as Correio Público
- Headquarters: Lisbon, Portugal
- Key people: João Bento (CEO)
- Services: Letter post, parcel service, EMS
- Website: ctt.pt

CTT – Correios de Portugal, S.A. (Portuguese pronunciation: [ˈse.te.te kuˈʁɐjuʒ ðɨ puɾtuˈɣal], lit. 'CTT – Post of Portugal') is a Portuguese company that operates as both the national postal service of Portugal and a commercial group with subsidiaries operating in banking, e-commerce, and other postal services. It was founded in 1520 by King Manuel I of Portugal, during the Portuguese Renaissance, and CTT is the oldest company still in operation in Portugal to this day.

The acronym CTT comes from the company's former name (Portuguese: Correios, Telégrafos e Telefones, which means "Post, Telegraph and Telephone"), which was also the designation of postal services for the former Portuguese Colonies and is still used for CTT – Post of Macau today.

In 1991, CTT became a public limited company, and in December 2013 its shares were listed on Euronext Lisbon.

In 2007, CTT began to offer a mobile phone service in Portugal, under the brand name Phone-ix. Phone-ix was closed down on 1 January 2019.

In 2014, CTT was privatized by the Portuguese government to raise money and comply with European Union requirements for its bailout. In the previous year, 70% of the CTT shares had already been tendered.

Its current and longest-running visual identity (that were introduced on 4 October 2004) were receiving subsequent redesigns in July 2015 and March 2020, but its logo (the current one that were introduced on 4 October 2004) remains virtually unchanged.

== History ==
- 1520: King Manuel I creates the public mail service of Portugal, the Correio Público—Public Post Office.
- 1533: The first postal service regulations in Portugal.
- 1753: The first financial mail regulations in Portugal.
- 1821: The beginning of house-to-house mail delivery in Portugal.
- 1880: The fusion of the Post Office and the Telegraphs Department into a single service, the Department of Posts, Telegraphs and Lighthouses—Direcção-Geral de Correios, Telégraphos e Faróis.
- 1911: the department received administrative and financial autonomy from the Portuguese State and became the General Administration of Posts, Telegraphs and Telephones—Administração-Geral dos Correios, Telégrafos e Telefones—adopting the CTT acronym which was kept until today, even after several changes of its official name.
- 1953: CTT adopts the horse rider logo. The logo represents an ancient postman rider of the CTT, announcing his arrival with a bugle. The logo was redesigned three times, most recently in 2004.
- 1969: CTT becomes a State Company, adopting the name CTT Correios e Telecomunicações de Portugal—CTT Posts and Telecommunications of Portugal.
- 1992: the telecommunications companies (TLP, Marconi and TDP) service is separated from the CTT, becoming an autonomous company, when it created Telecom Portugal S.A., later in 1994 it merged and created Portugal Telecom (PT Portugal) following the spin-off of CTT and in 2018 it moved this name of Altice Portugal. At the same time, CTT becomes a public limited company (with all shares owned by the Portuguese government), adopting the name CTT Correios de Portugal—CTT Posts of Portugal.
- 30 November 2007: CTT launches Phone-ix, a mobile virtual network operator (MVNO) operating on the MEO network.
- 2014: the CTT becomes an entirely private company.
- 1 January 2019: CTT closes down Phone-ix.

== The CTT group ==
The CTT group includes the following subsidiaries:

- CTT Correios: national and international regular mail delivering company;
- CTT Expresso: national and international express mail service;
- Banco CTT: Portuguese bank belonging to CTT competing with Banco BPI and Novo Banco;
- Mailtec: management and information systems research & development company;
- PostContacto: non addressed mail delivering company;
- Campos Envelopagem: direct marketing and editorial mail company;
- PayShop: utility services pay net service;
- Tourline Express: express mail service (Spain).

== Gallery ==
CTT Expresso

PayShop

Phone-ix

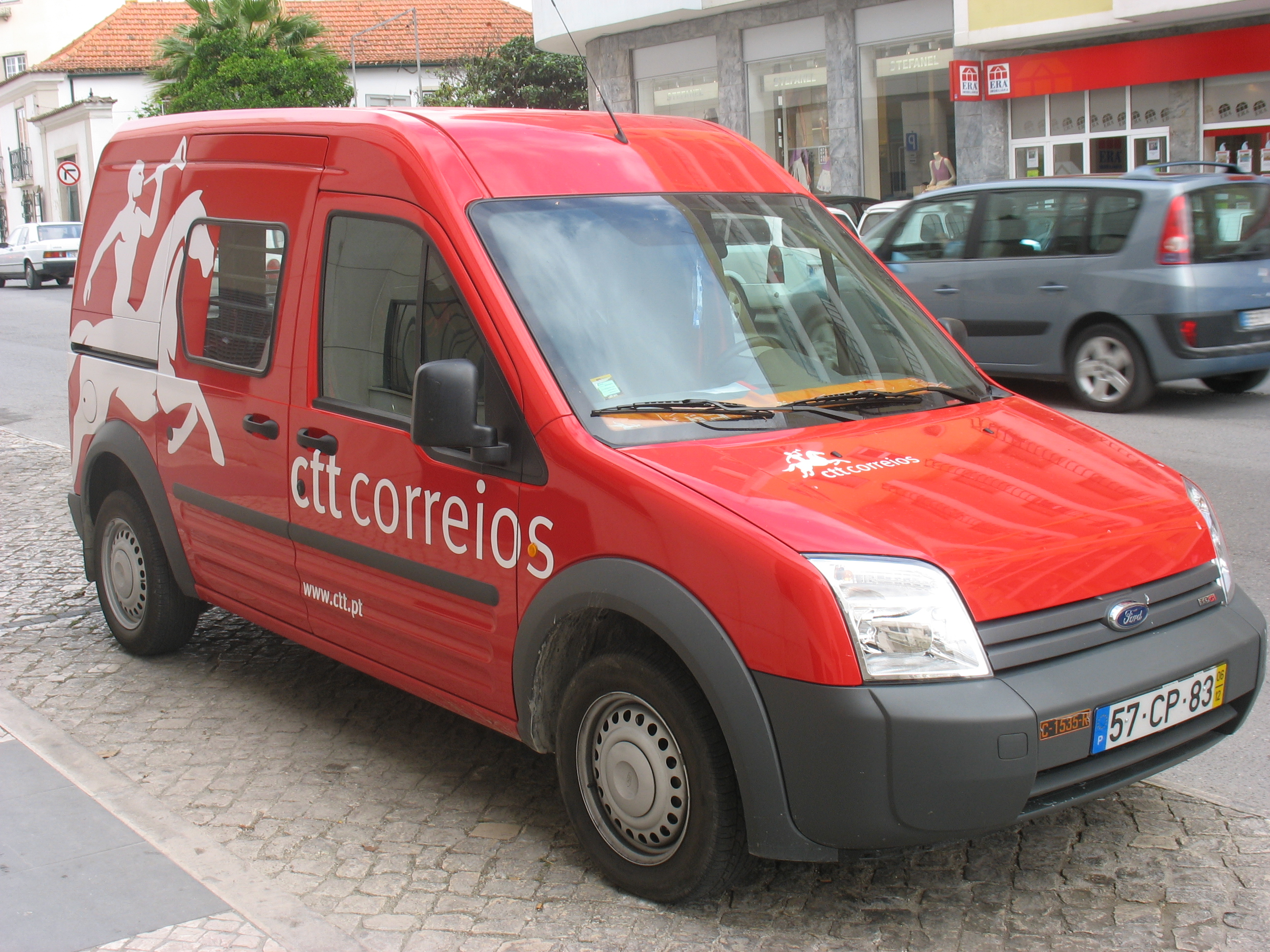
A CTT mail delivery vehicle

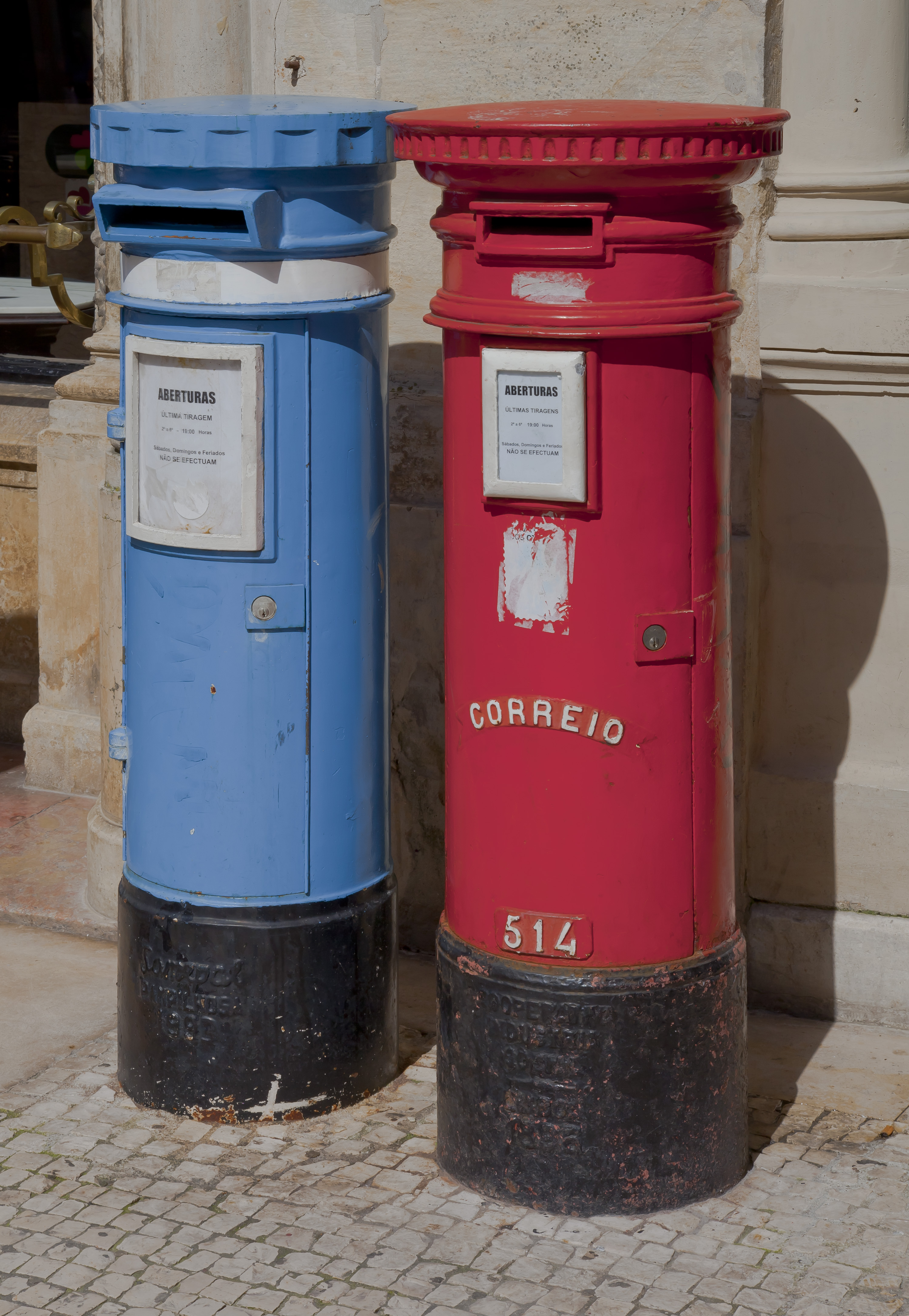
CTT traditional mail boxes for normal mail (red) and priority mail (blue)

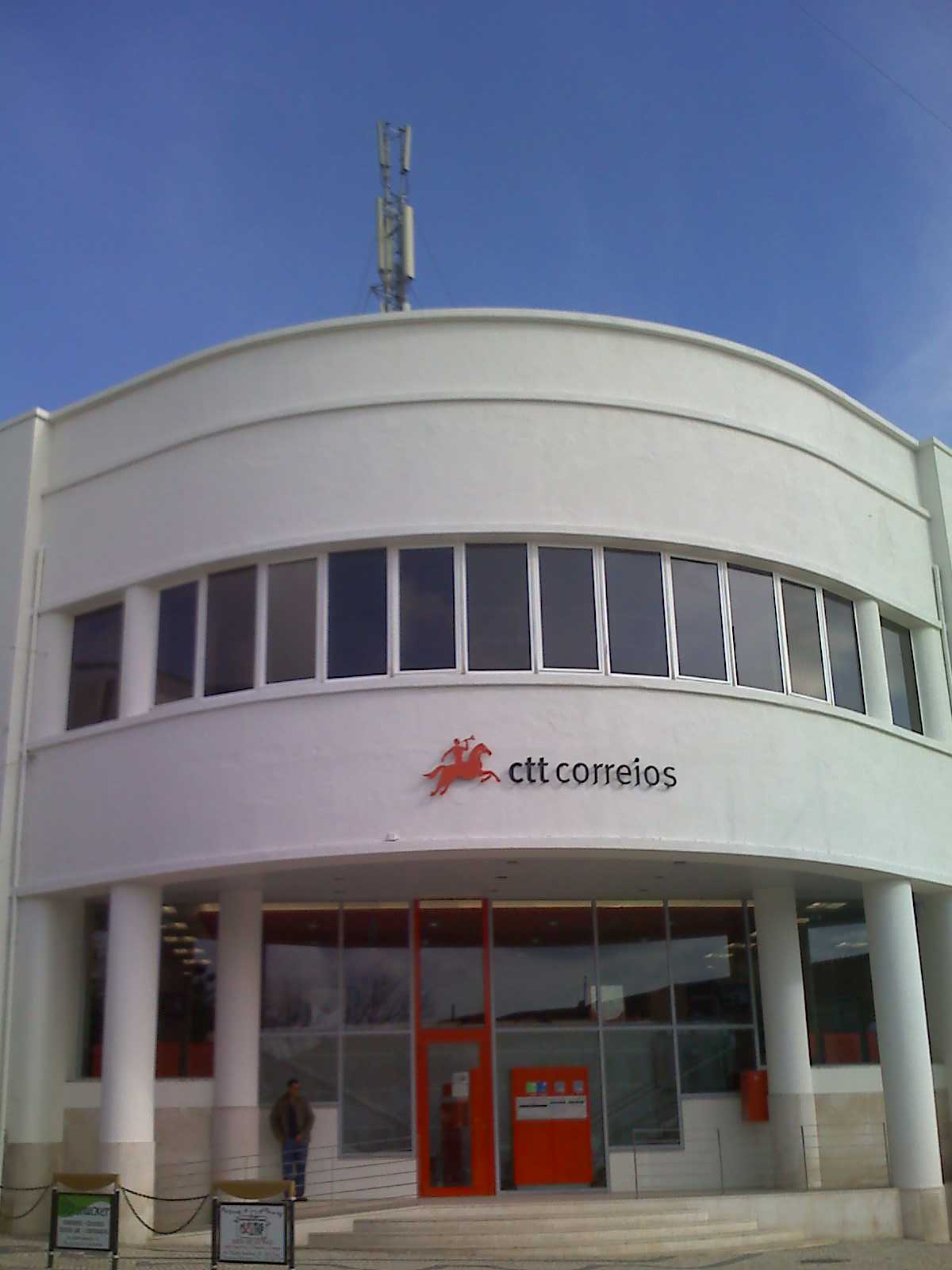
A CTT local post office

== See also ==
- Postal Union of the Americas, Spain and Portugal
