= Tajik Post =

Postal service company in Tajikistan

SUE Tajikistan Post
- Native name: Квд Почтаи Тоҷикистон (Tajik); ГУП Почта Таджикистана (Russian)
- Industry: Postal services, courier
- Founded: 1996; 30 years ago
- Headquarters: Dushanbe, Tajikistan
- Area served: Tajikistan
- Services: Letter post, Parcel service, EMS, Delivery, Financial services
- Owner: Government of Tajikistan
- Website: www.tajikpost.tj

Tajik Post (Tajik: Почтаи Тоҷикистон; Russian: Почта Таджикистана), formally SUE Tajikistan Post, is the state owned national postal and courier service provider of Tajikistan. Headquartered in Dushanbe, it was established in 1996, having joined the Universal Postal Union (UPU) on 9 June 1994.

As of 2026, Tajikistan Post operates three regional branches, 64 city and district postal centres, and 470 post offices throughout the country.

== History ==
=== Before independence ===
The first post office in Tajikistan was reportedly opened in Khujand in 1865, when the area formed part of the Emirate of Bukhara. The Khujand-Tashkent postal route began operating the following year and was later extended to Samarkand. Personal correspondence, government orders, and official assignments were transported along the route by caravan.

In September 1924, the first permanent post office was opened in Dushanbe, then part of the Bukharan People's Soviet Republic. Around 30,000 letters were received during that year. By the establishment of the Tajik Soviet Socialist Republic in 1929, there were 46 post offices and 150 post boxes across the republic. During the Great Patriotic War, postal activity was significant, in 1943, approximately 10,000 packages were received for onward delivery to soldiers.

=== Since 1991 ===
Following Tajikistan's independence from the Soviet Union in 1991, the country's postal service was reorganised. In 1996, the state department Tajikistan Post was established. The following year, after the merger of the Communications and Transport ministries, the state owned enterprise Tajik Post was founded.

During its early years, the postal service reportedly suffered from reliability problems, and many residents instead relied on acquaintances travelling to Tajikistan to carry letters and other items. Public use and confidence in the postal system consequently remained limited.

Tajik Post also faced issues involving illegal stamps issued by private companies misusing Tajikistan's name. Some of these stamps featured subjects unrelated to the country. On 17 June 2002, Tajik Post issued a circular through the UPU warning postal administrations about such stamps.

In June 2017, the Communications Service under the Government of Tajikistan suspended the operations of four international logistics companies, DHL, Pony Express, TNT Express, and UPS, stating that companies providing postal services were required to obtain operating licences. The decision left EMS Tajikistan, operated by Tajik Post, as the country's only licensed international courier service. The measure attracted criticism over concerns that it effectively created a monopoly while postal service standards remained low. In August 2021, DHL was granted an operating licence, while the other providers reportedly remained without licences.

=== From 2020 onwards ===
In July 2024, postal services between Russia and Tajikistan were suspended after Russian Post reportedly stopped accepting postal shipments from Tajikistan. International shipments to Russia consequently had to be sent through private courier companies, generally at higher rates. Regular postal services between the two countries resumed in May 2025.

On 25 September 2025, Tajik Post (Почтаи тоҷик), the Special Communication Department (Алоқаи махсус), and the Stamps Department (Маркази марка) were merged to form Tajikistan Post (Почтаи Тоҷикистон). The restructuring was intended to improve operational efficiency within the country's postal sector.

On 23 February 2026, a US$5 million modernisation programme was launched to upgrade Tajikistan Post's infrastructure and introduce an automated postal processing system. The programme is intended to expand the postal service's capacity to handle growing logistics and e-commerce demand, and is expected to create more than 150 new jobs.

== Services ==
Tajikistan Post provides domestic and international postal services for letters, parcels, and packages, but does not accept the mailing of documents. Items can be posted from post offices throughout the country, however for parcels and packages, recipients are generally notified of their arrival, and are required to collect them from the relevant post office. Currently, the domestic postage rates begin at TJS 1.20 for letters and TJS 1.70 for parcels. While international rates start at TJS 10.40 for letters and TJS 12 for parcels.

Other services provided by Tajikistan Post include:

- EMS delivery, which are delivered door to door within 2 to 4 days
- E-commerce delivery
- Logistics delivery
- Financial services
- International money transfers
