= Agencia Boliviana de Correos =

Postal service in Bolivia

Bolivian Postal Agency
- Agencia Boliviana de Correos
- Predecessor: Empresa de Correos de Bolivia
- Formation: 1 March 2018
- Type: Postal service
- Headquarters: La Paz, Bolivia
- Official language: Spanish
- Website: www.correos.gob.bo

Correos de Bolivia (lit. 'Bolivian Postal Agency') is a state-owned corporation that functions as Bolivia's official national postal service since 1 March 2018. The agency took over the responsibilities of the former Empresa de Correos de Bolivia, which was dissolved and underwent liquidation due to financial challenges.
