= Empresa de Correos de Bolivia =

Empresa de Correos de Bolivia (lit. 'Postal Company of Bolivia', ECOBOL) is a state-owned corporation that served as the national post office of Bolivia from 1990 to 2017. The company was created by Supreme Decree 22616, issued by President Jaime Paz Zamora on October 3, 1990. It replaced the Dirección General de los Correos, a government bureau that provided postal services until 1990.

On March 1, 2018, the Bolivian government abruptly announced the closure of the financially struggling firm, surrounded its principal offices with police, and posted notices informing ECOBOL workers that they could receive their legally authorized benefits at designated locations. Supreme Decree 3495, issued the same day, created an ECOBOL Liquidation Unit to oversee the company's dissolution. The same decree created the Agencia Boliviana de Correos (lit. 'Bolivian Postal Agency'), an entity with a budget of 50 million Bolivianos, to take over mail services in the country.
