= Notre-Dame Cathedral Basilica of Saigon =

Catholic church in Ho Chi Minh City, Vietnam

Minor Basilica of Our Lady of the Immaculate Conception in Saigon
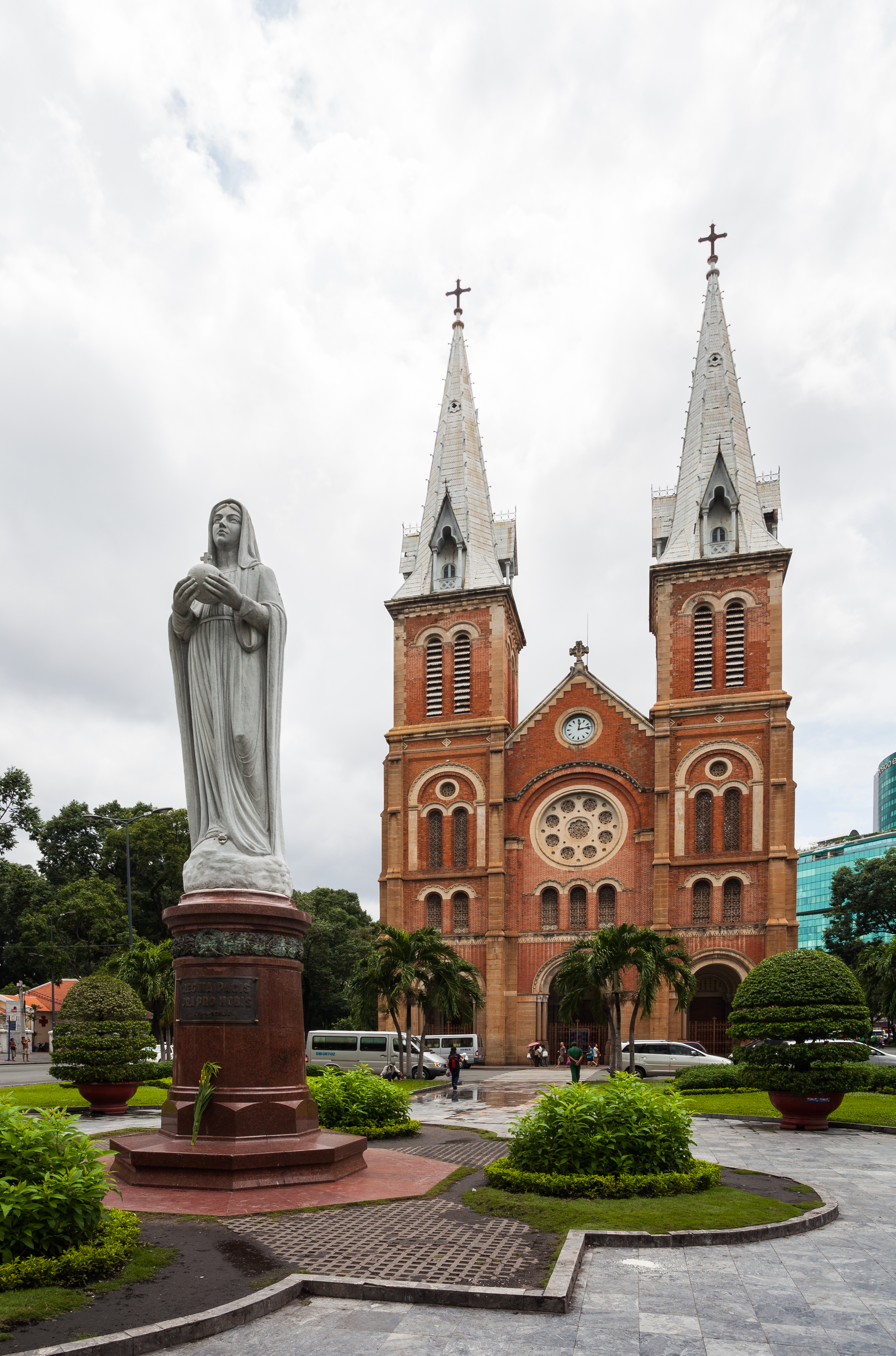
- Cathedral Basilica of the Immaculate Conception in Saigon

Religion
- Affiliation: Roman Catholic
- Diocese: Archdiocese of Saigon
- Rite: Latin Rite
- Ecclesiastical or organisational status: Cathedral
- Patron: Our Lady of Immaculate Conception
- Year consecrated: 1959

Location
- Location: Paris Commune Square, Saigon ward, Ho Chi Minh City, Vietnam
- Interactive map of Minor Basilica of Our Lady of the Immaculate Conception in Saigon
- Coordinates: 10°46′47″N 106°41′57″E

Architecture
- Type: Church
- Style: Romanesque revival
- Established: 1863
- Groundbreaking: 1877
- Completed: 1880

The Cathedral Basilica of Our Lady of the Immaculate Conception in Saigon (Vietnamese: Vương cung thánh đường Chính tòa Đức Mẹ Vô nhiễm Nguyên tội Bà Sài Gòn) is a Roman Catholic minor basilica and cathedral located in Saigon, Vietnam. The cathedral was originally established by French Catholic priests who originally named it the Church of Saigon (French: l'Église de Saïgon), was constructed between 1877 and 1880. The shrine is dedicated to the Blessed Virgin Mary of the Immaculate Conception.

Pope John XXIII raised the shrine to the status of Minor Basilica via his decree Spectabile Monumentum Fidei on 13 November 1962. The decree was signed and notarized by Cardinal Amleto Cicognani.

The name Notre-Dame Cathedral has been used since 1959, when the statue of Our Lady of Peace was installed in its forecourt. It has two bell towers, reaching a height of 58 meters (190 feet).

== History ==
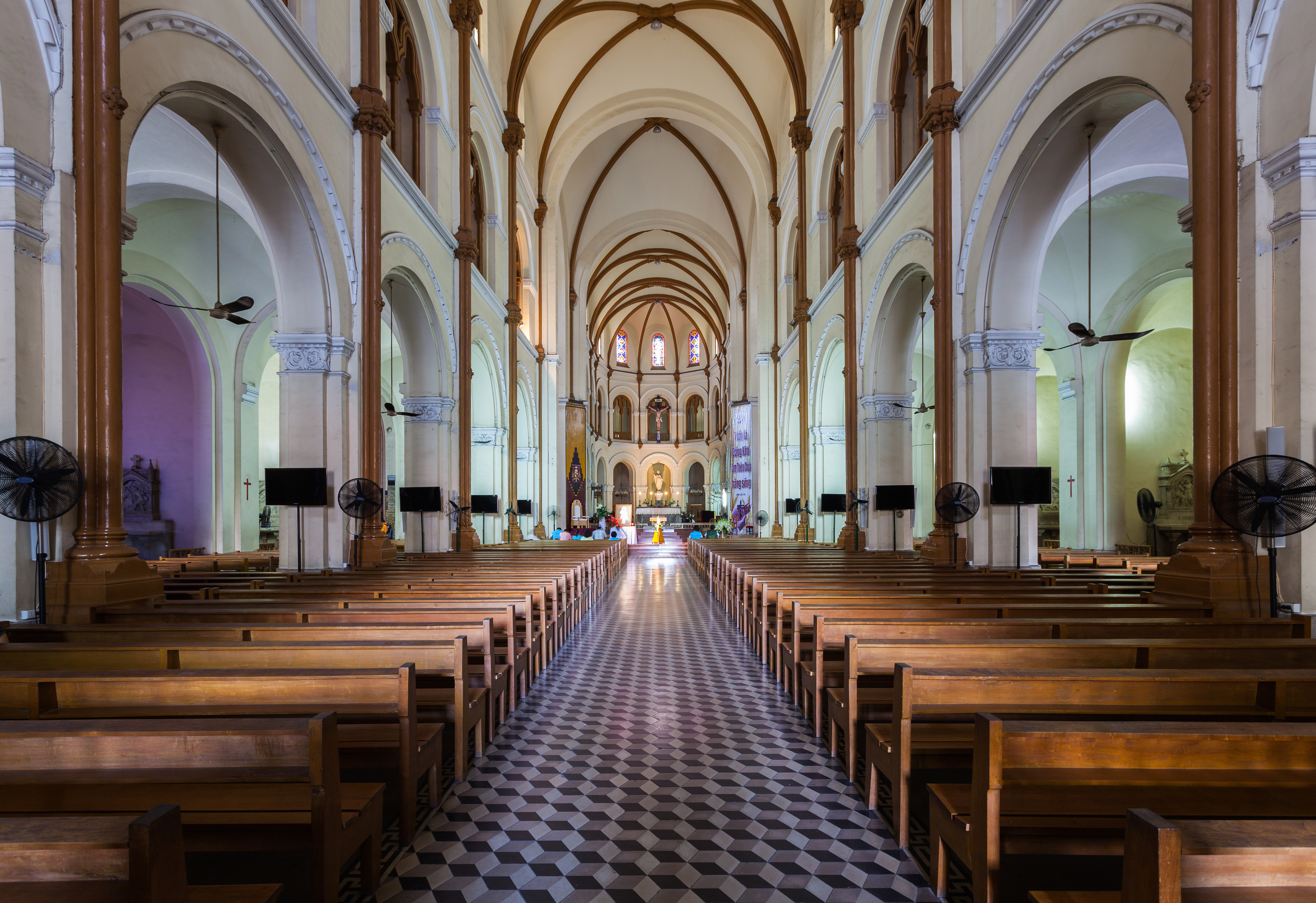
View of the cathedral nave.

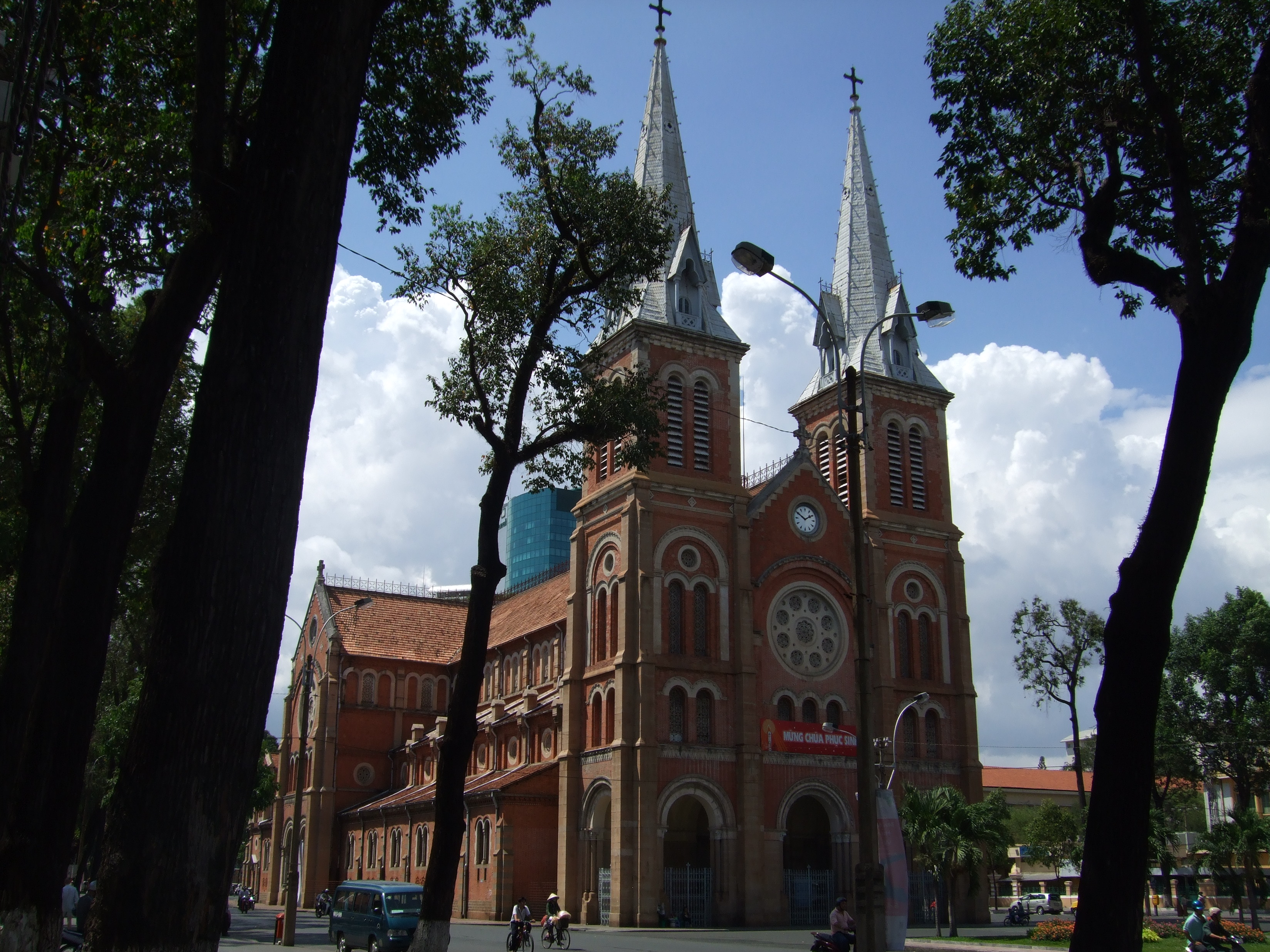
Side view of the basilica.

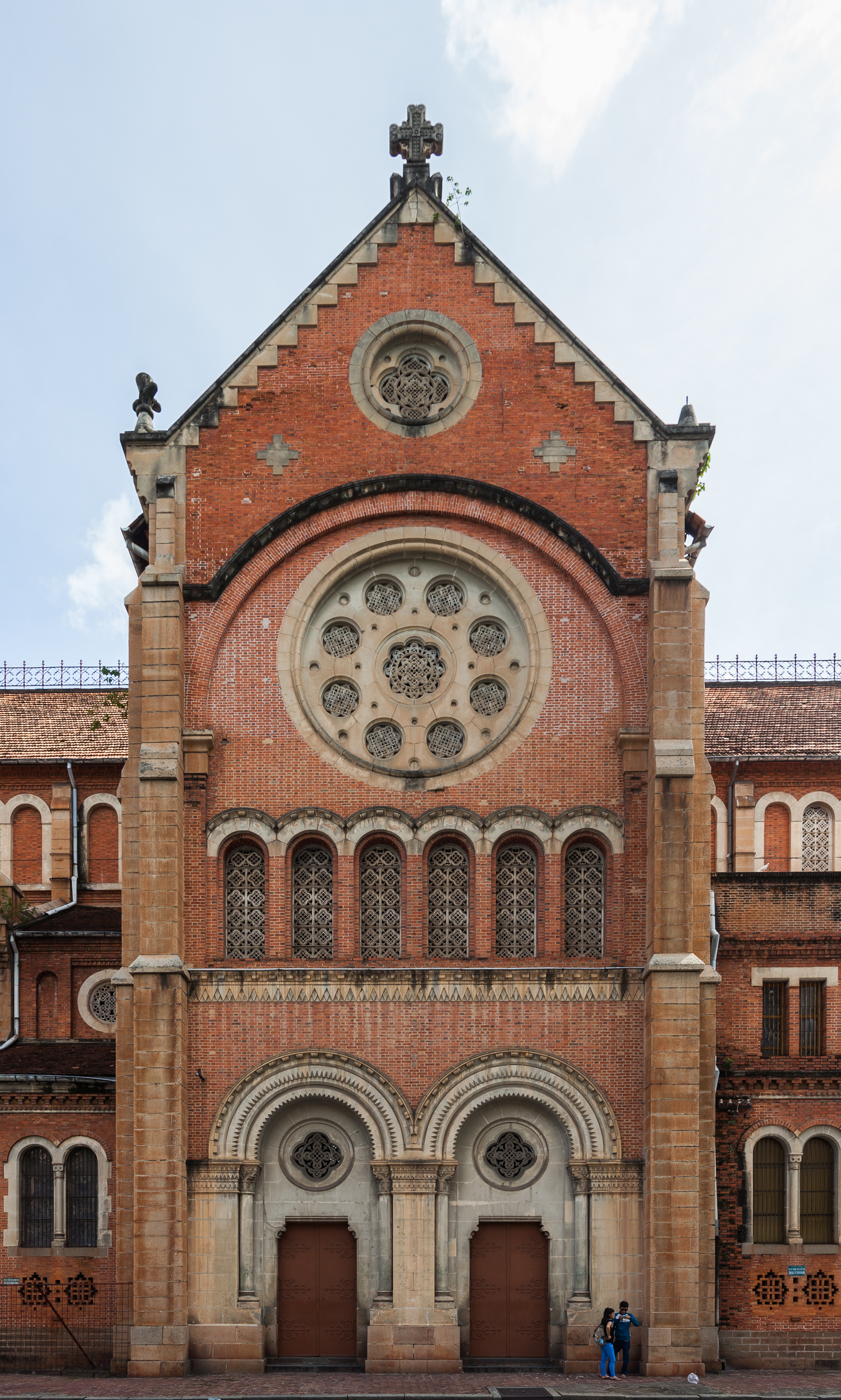
Side transept

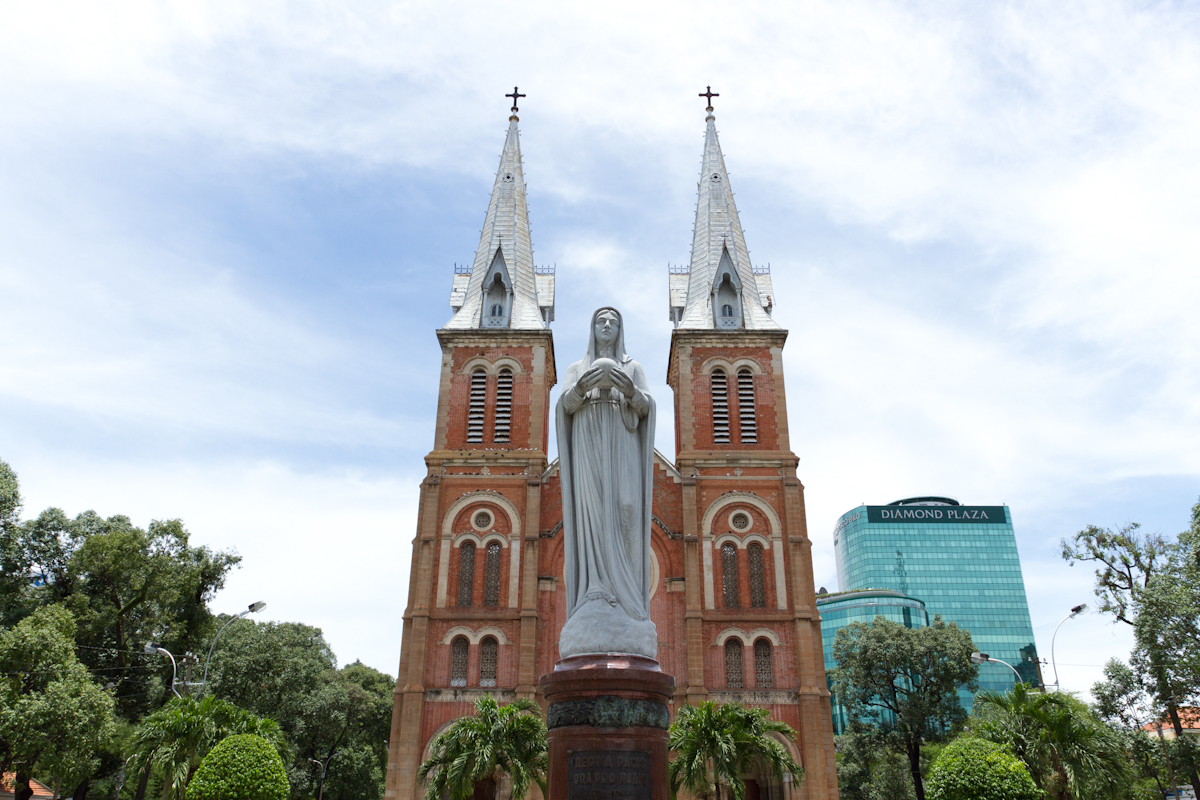
Closer view of the façade

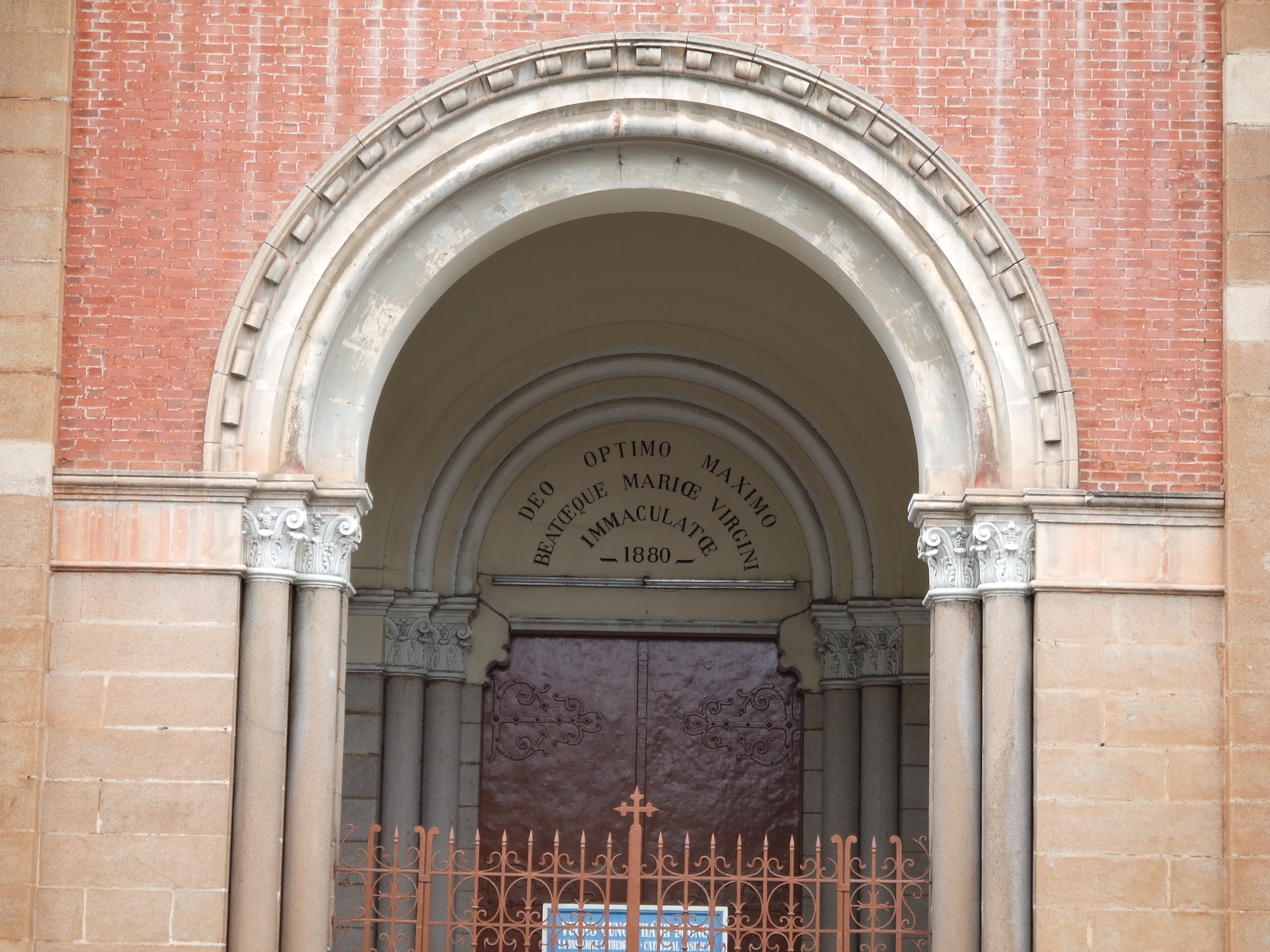
Main gate of the basilica.

Following the French conquest of Cochinchina and Saigon, the Catholic Church established a community and religious services for the French. The first church was built on today's Ngo Duc Ke Street, but it was too small. Bishop Lefevre decided to build a bigger church. Thus in 1863, Admiral Bonard decided to build a wooden church on the bank of Charner canal (Kinh Lớn). Lefevre put the first stone for construction of the church on 28 March 1863. The construction was completed two years later and was called "Saigon Church". When the wooden church was damaged by termites, all church services were held in the guest-chamber of the French Governor's Palace, which turned into a seminary until the Notre-Dame Cathedral was completed.

After the design competition, bids were accepted for construction. Again, J. Bourard was the successful bidder and became supervisor of constructions.

Originally, there were three proposed sites for construction:

- On the site of the former test school (today, this is at the corner of Le Duan Boulevard and Hai Ba Trung Street).
- At Kinh Lon (now Nguyễn Huệ Boulevard)
- At the present site where the cathedral is situated.

All building materials were imported from France. The outside wall of the cathedral was built with bricks from Toulouse. Although the contractor did not use coated concrete, these bricks have retained their bright red colour.

On 7 October 1877, Bishop Isidore Colombert laid the first stone in an inaugural ceremony. The construction of the cathedral took three years. On Easter Day, 11 April 1880, a blessing ceremony and ceremony of completion were solemnly organized in presence of the Governor of Cochinchina Charles Le Myre de Vilers. One can see the granite plate inside the main entry gate commemorating the start and completion dates and designer. The total cost was 2,500,000 French francs (nominal price of the mid to late 19th century). At the beginning, the cathedral was called State Cathedral due to the source of the construction funds.

In 1895, two bell towers were added to the cathedral, each 57.6 m high with six bronze bells with the total weight of 28.85 metric tonnes. The crosses were installed on the top of each tower of 3.5 m high, 2 m wide, 600 kg in weight. The total height of the cathedral to the top of the Cross is 60.5 m.

In the flower garden in front of the cathedral, there was a bronze statue of Pigneau de Behaine (also called Bishop of Adran) leading Prince Cảnh, the son of Emperor Gia Long by his right hand. The statue was made in France. In 1945, the statue was removed, but the foundation remains.

In 1959, Bishop Joseph Pham Van Thien, whose jurisdiction included Saigon parish, attended the Marian Congress held in Vatican and ordered a statue of Our Lady of Peace made with granite in Rome. When the statue arrived in Saigon on 16 February 1959, Bishop Pham Van Thien held a ceremony to install the statue on the empty base and presented the title of "Regina Pacis". It was the same bishop who wrote the prayers "Notre-Dame bless the peace to Vietnam". The next day, Cardinal Agagianian came from Rome to chair the closing ceremony of the Marian Congress and solemnly chaired the ceremony for the statue. From that point, the church was called Notre-Dame Cathedral.

In 1960, Pope John XXIII erected Roman Catholic dioceses in Vietnam and assigned archbishops to Hanoi, Huế and Saigon. The cathedral was titled Saigon Chief Cathedral. In 1962, Pope John XXIII anointed the Saigon Chief Cathedral, and conferred it the status of a basilica. From this time, this cathedral was called Saigon Notre-Dame Cathedral Basilica.

=== 21st century ===
During October 2005, the statue was reported to have shed tears, attracting thousands of people and forcing authorities to stop traffic around the cathedral. However, the top clergy of the Catholic Church in Vietnam could not confirm that the Virgin Mary statue in front of a cathedral had shed tears, but that failed to disperse the crowd flocking to the statue days after the incident. The reported "tear" flowed down the right cheek of the face of the statue.

In 2025, the basilica is in renovation.

== Special characteristics ==
All the original building materials were imported from France. Tiles have been carved with the words Guichard Carvin, Marseille St André France, stating the district in Marseille where the tiles were produced. Some tiles are carved with the words Wang-Tai Saigon. Many tiles have since been made in Saigon to replace the tiles that were damaged by the war. There are 56 glass squares supplied by the Lorin firm of Chartres, the French town famous for the 13th century stained-glass windows of its cathedral. The cathedral foundation was designed to bear ten times the weight of the cathedral.

Stained-glass windows by Lorin firm from Chartres

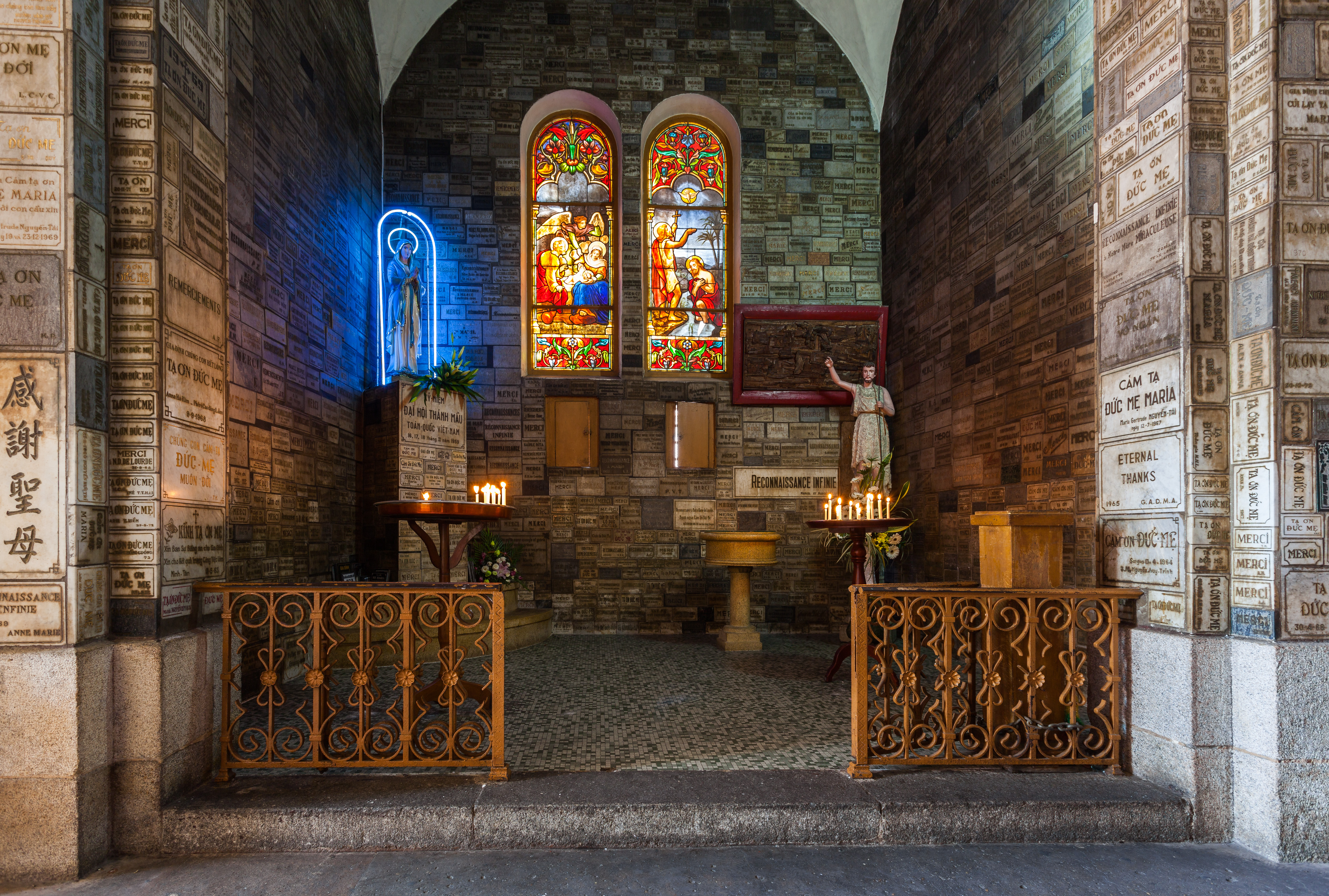

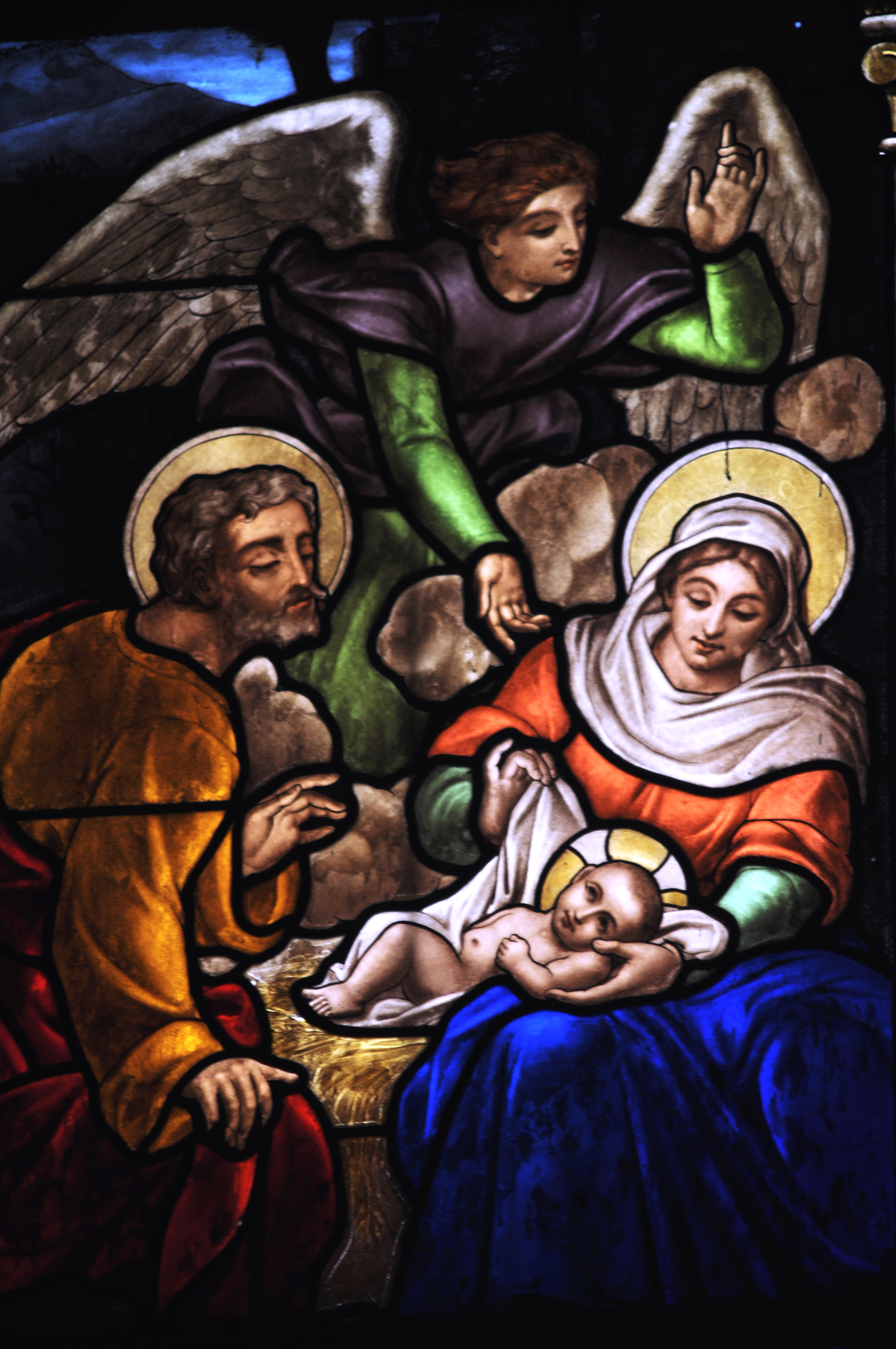

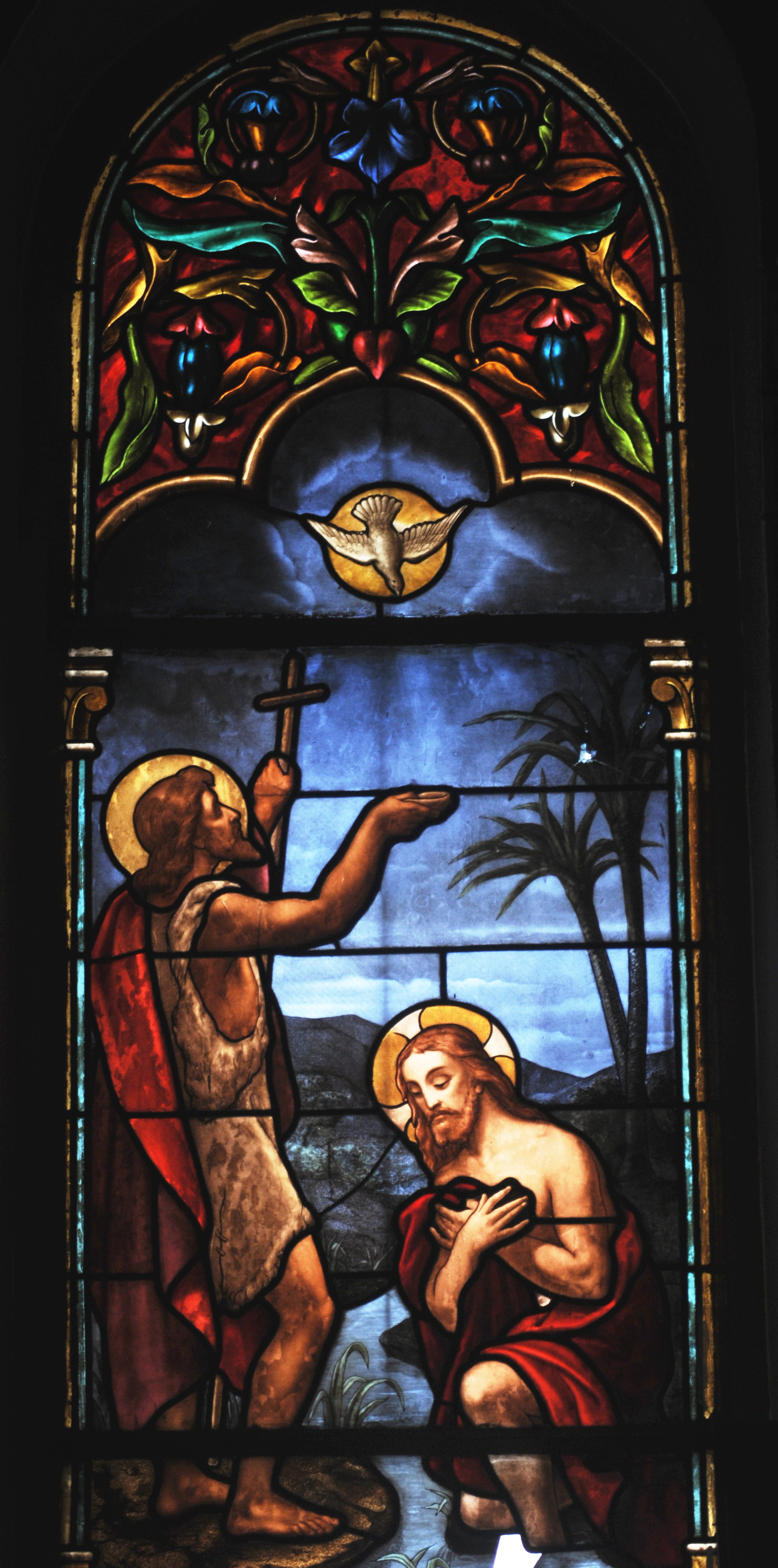

== See also ==
- St. Joseph's Cathedral, Hanoi, its sister cathedral
- Roman Catholic Archdiocese of Ho Chi Minh City
- Catholic Church in Vietnam
- Roman Catholic Marian churches
