= Syrian Post =

National post service for Syria

Syrian Post Cooperation
- Trade name: Syrian Post
- Native name: المؤسسة السورية للبريد
- Industry: Postal services, courier
- Founded: 1975
- Headquarters: Damascus, Syria
- Area served: Worldwide
- Services: Letter post, parcel service, EMS, delivery, Financial services
- Owner: Government of Syria
- Website: www.syrianpost.gov.sy

Syrian Post, officially known as the Syrian Postal Corporation (Arabic: المؤسسة السورية للبريد, romanized: al-Muʾassasah al-Sūriyyah lil-Barīd), is the state-operated postal service of Syria, responsible for mail delivery and related logistics nationwide. The company is legally incorporated as a cooperative.

Established in 1975, it manages a network of 210 post offices across Syria's 14 governorates.

== History ==
French, Egyptian and Ottoman stamps have been used in Syria prior to it becoming an independent state.

Syria joined the Universal Postal Union on May 15, 1946

Syrian Post was established by virtue of the organizational decree No. 1936 dated 10 July 1975.
