= Correos del Ecuador =

Defunct national post office of Ecuador

- Defunct: 2020
- Headquarters: Quito, Ecuador
- Area served: Ecuador
- Services: National Post Office

Correos del Ecuador is the national post office of Ecuador. It was first created on May 2, 1831 by President Juan José Flores as part of the Vice Presidency, and it is considered the oldest public company in Ecuador. The company suffered financial losses and it was submitted for liquidation in May 2020.
