= Vietnam Post =

National Post Office

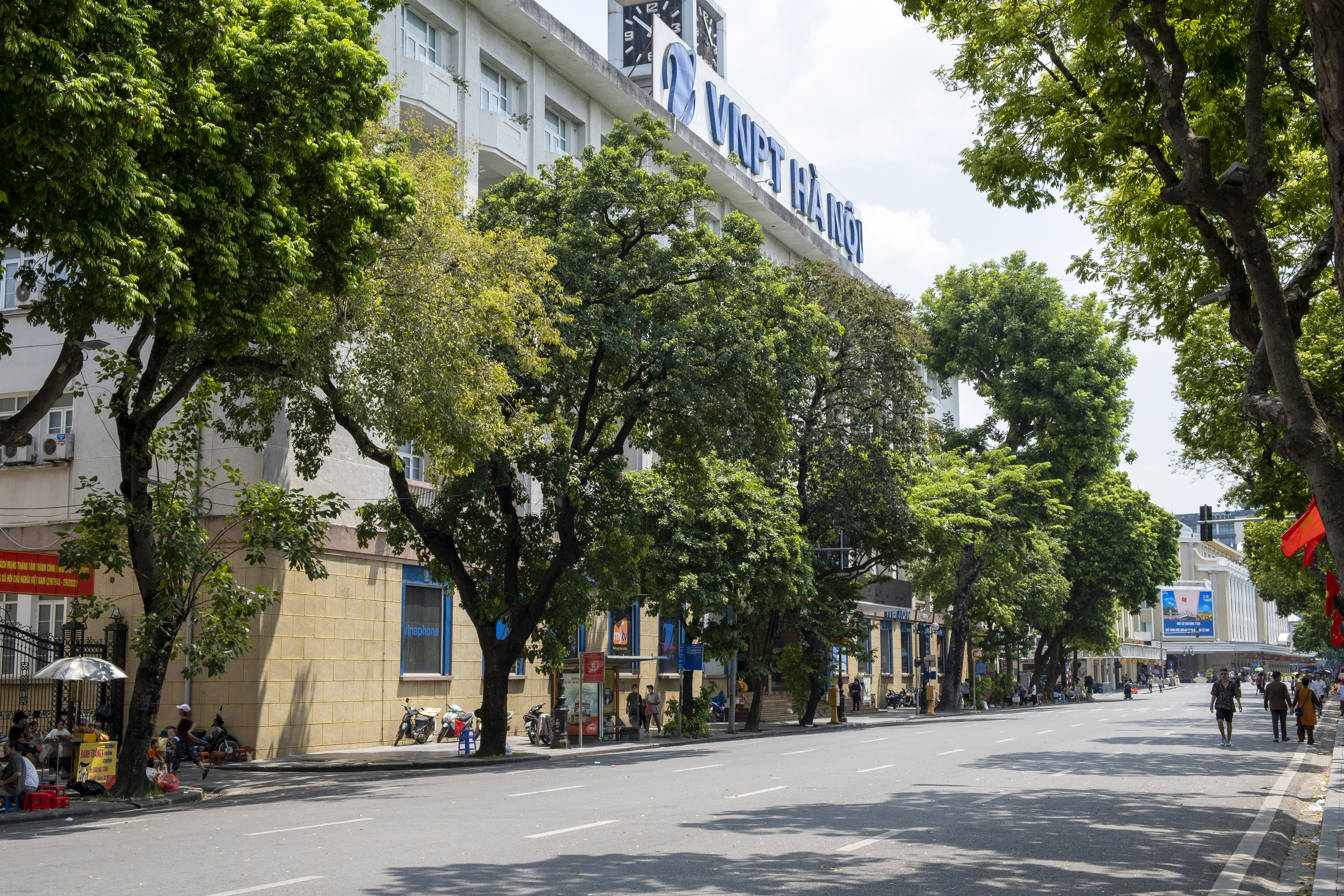
- Central Post Office, Hanoi, Vietnam.
- Trade name: VNPost
- Industry: Postal services, courier
- Predecessor: Subsidiary of VNPT
- Headquarters: Hanoi, Vietnam
- Services: Letter post, parcel service, EMS, delivery, postal banking
- Owner: Government of Vietnam
- Website: vnpost.vn

Vietnam Post (VNPost; Vietnamese: Tổng công ty Bưu điện Việt Nam, lit. 'Vietnam Post Corporation') is the Vietnamese government-owned postal service.

== Universal Postal Union ==
Vietnam joined the Universal Postal Union on 20 October 1951.

== History ==
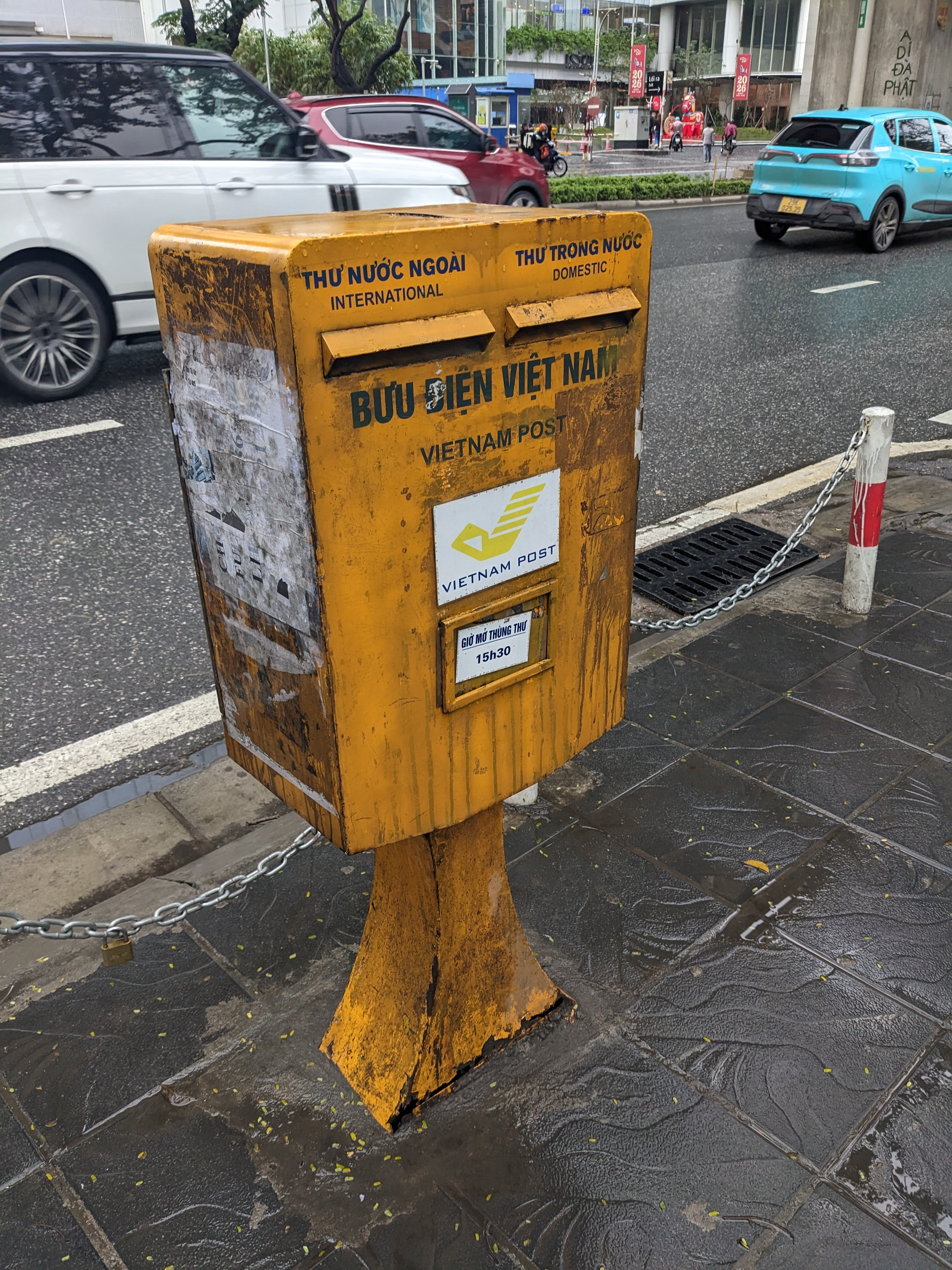
Mailing box for Vietnam Post in Hanoi

Vietnam Post was established on the basis of the pilot project to establish Vietnam Posts and Telecommunications Group (VNPT) approved by the Prime Minister in Decision No. 58/2005/QD-TTg dated 23 March 2005. On 1 June 2007, Prime Minister Nguyễn Tấn Dũng signed the approval of the project to establish Vietnam Post Corporation with the international name Vietnam Post and the abbreviation VNPost.

On 15 June 2007, the Ministry of Posts and Telecommunications (now the Ministry of Information and Communications) issued Decision No. 16/2007/QD-TCCB-BBCVT, officially establishing Vietnam Post Corporation.

On November 16, 2012, the Prime Minister of Vietnam issued Decision 1746/QĐ-TTg to transfer the ownership representation at the Vietnam Post Corporation from the Vietnam Posts and Telecommunications Group to the Ministry of Information and Communications. On December 28, 2012, the Ministry of Information and Communications changed the name of Vietnam Post Corporation to Vietnam Posts and Telecommunications Group. Ngày 6/1/2015, Bộ Thông tin và Truyền thông tổ chức lại Công ty mẹ Tổng công ty Bưu điện Việt Nam theo mô hình quản lý của Tổng công ty.

In 2018, VNPost was officially listed on the Ho Chi Minh City Stock Exchange (HOSE). In 2020, VNPost launched the Digital Transformation Center (VNPost Digital).

Currently, the Vietnam Post Corporation is a member of the Universal Postal Union.

== See also ==
- List of national postal services
