= Postage stamps and postal history of the Netherlands =

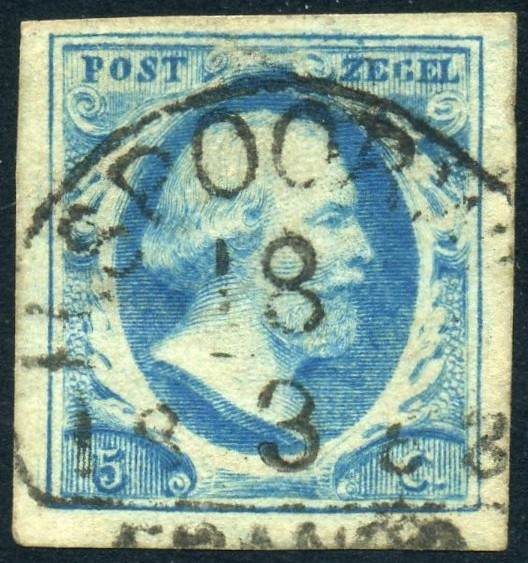
A used 5c stamp of the Netherlands from the series first issued in 1852

This is a survey of the postage stamps and postal history of the Netherlands.

The postal region of the Netherlands is located in North-West Europe and comprises the whole territory of the Kingdom of the Netherlands in Europe and until 2010 the full territory of the country the Netherlands. Four other postal regions exist in the kingdom: for Aruba, the Caribbean Netherlands (Bonaire, Sint Eustatius and Saba), Curaçao and Sint Maarten.

== First stamps ==
The first stamps of the Netherlands were issued in 1852 and depicted King William III.

== 1931 stamps ==
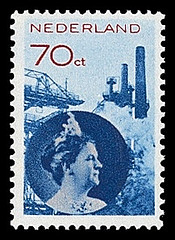
(design by Piet Zwart)

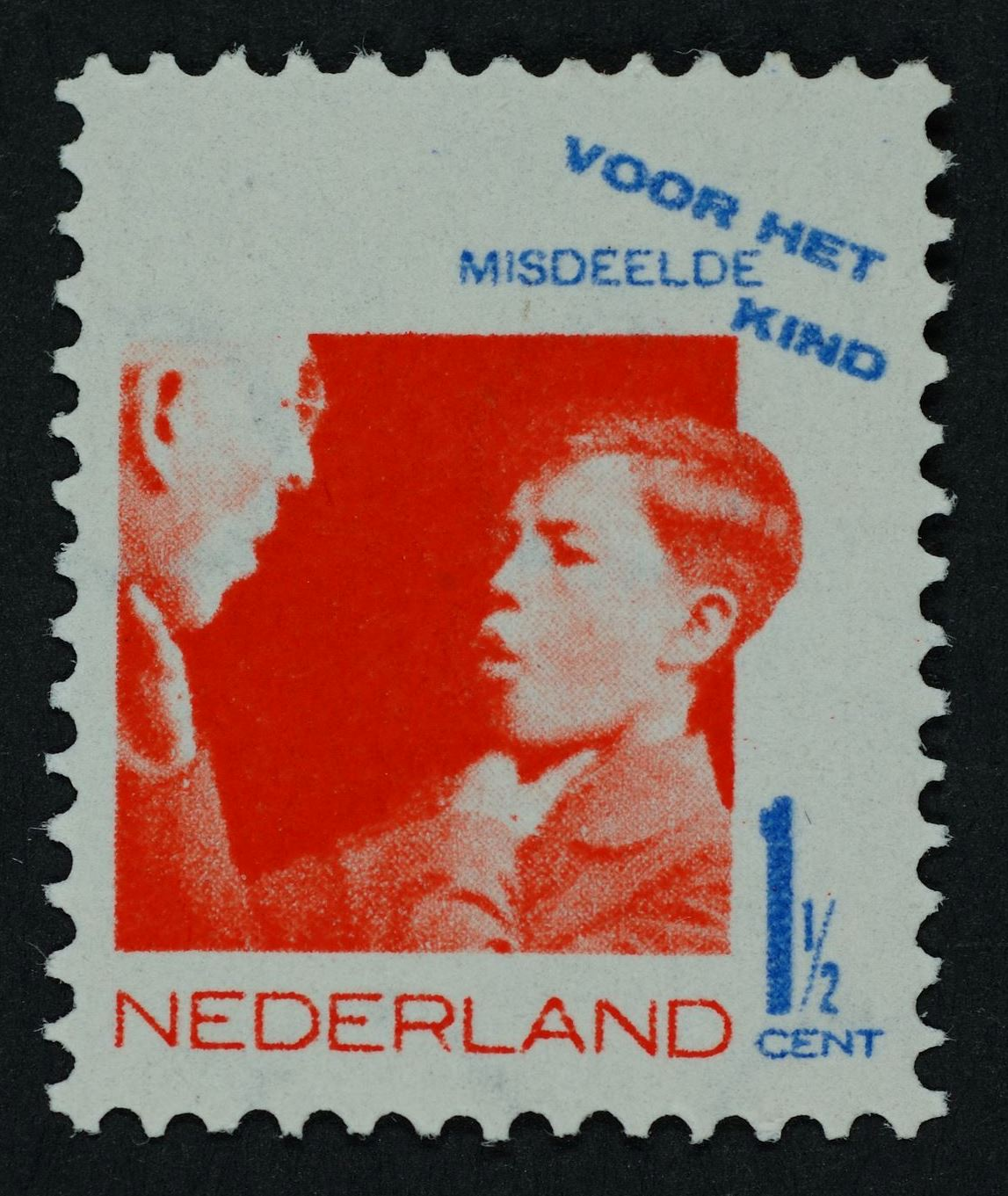
(design Gerard Kiljan)

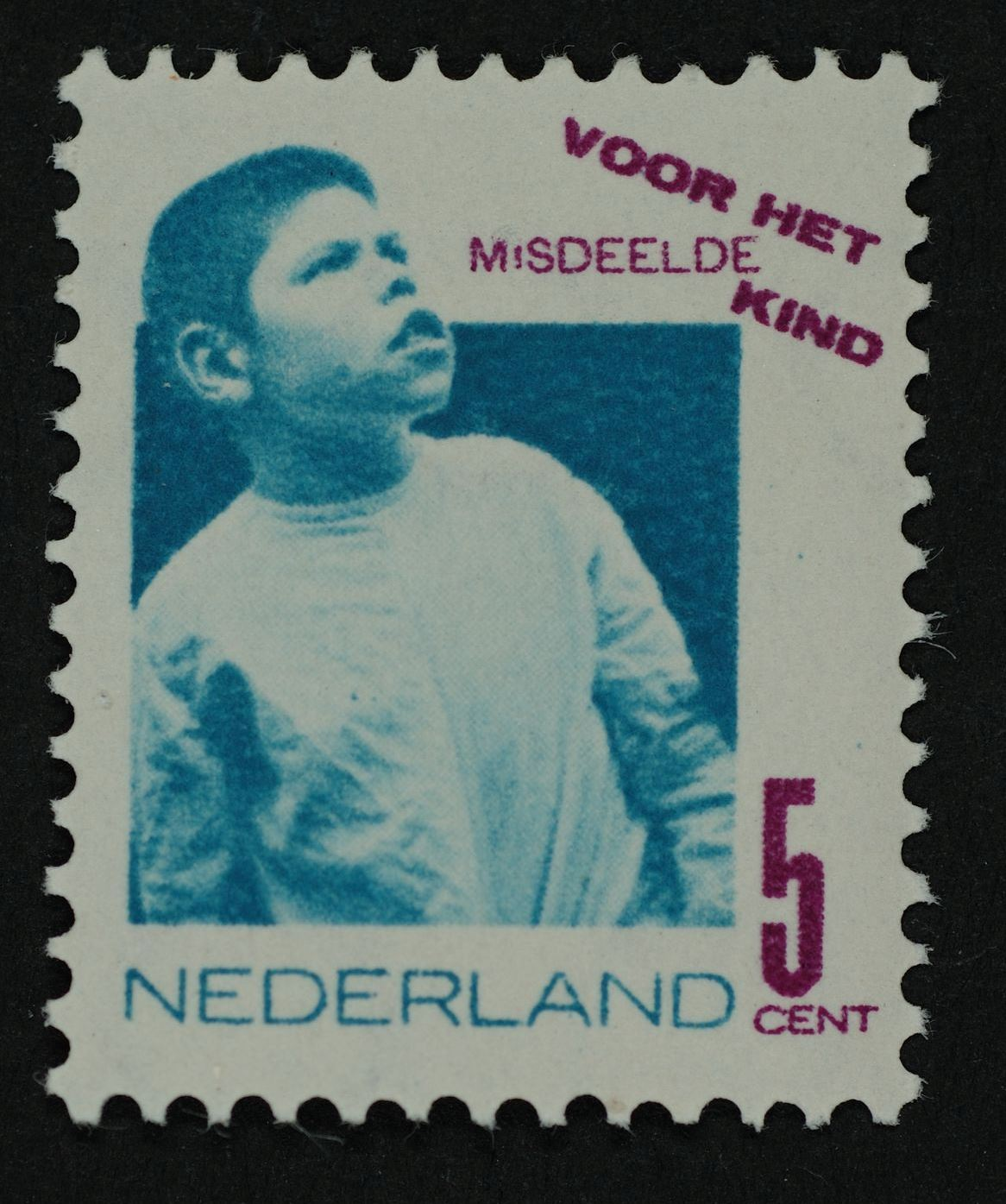

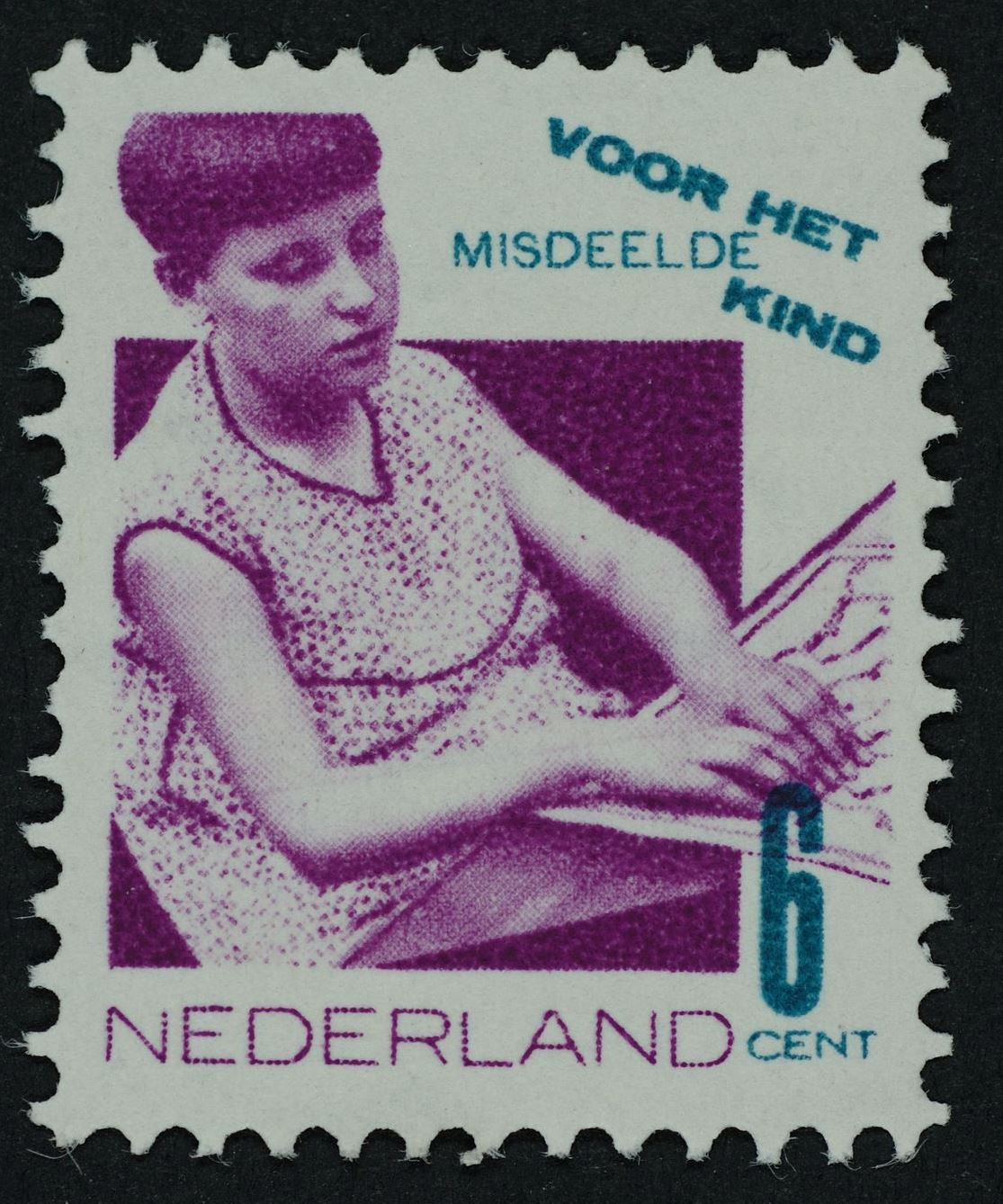

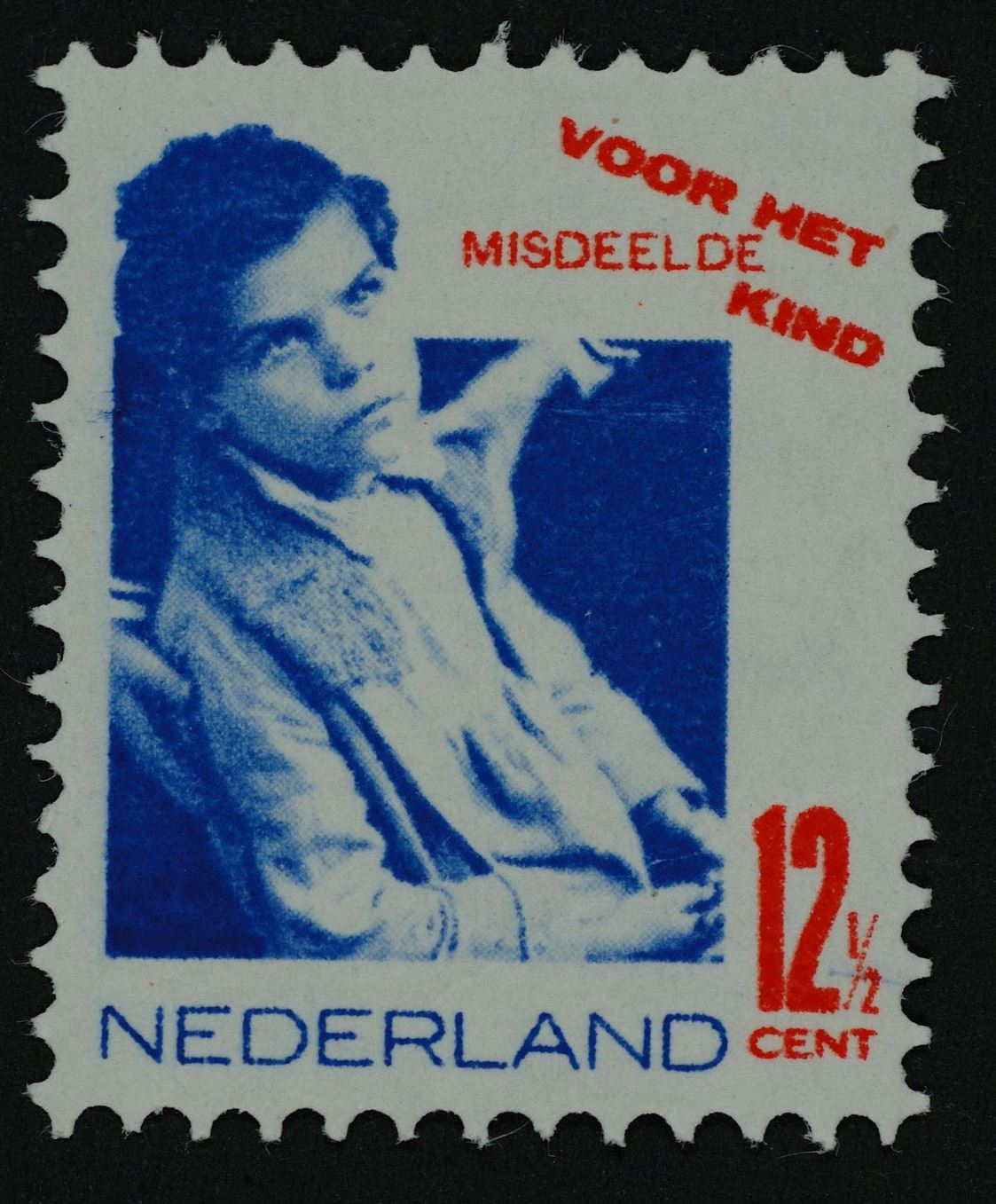

== Second World War ==
During the Second World War the Netherlands were occupied by Germany. Stamp issues continued and a number of semi-postal stamps were issued.

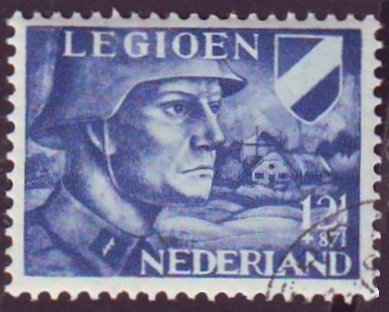
1942 stamp

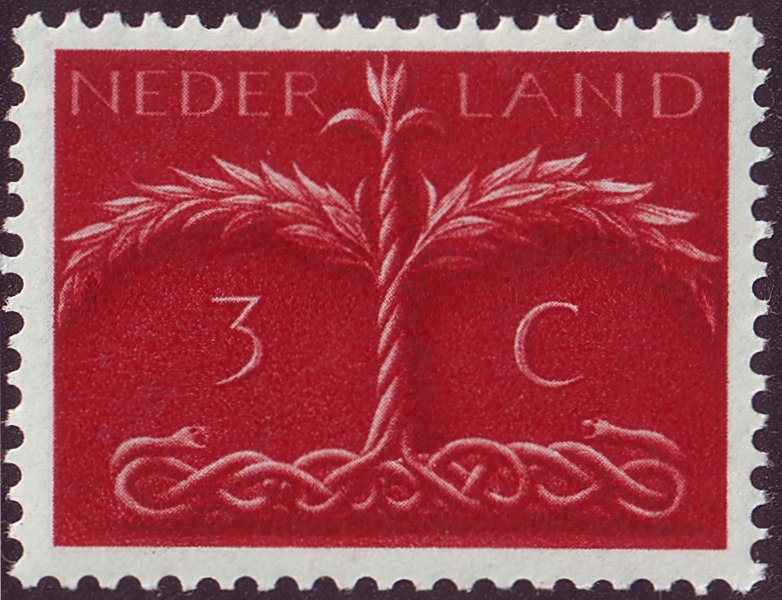
1943 stamp (design by Pyke Koch)

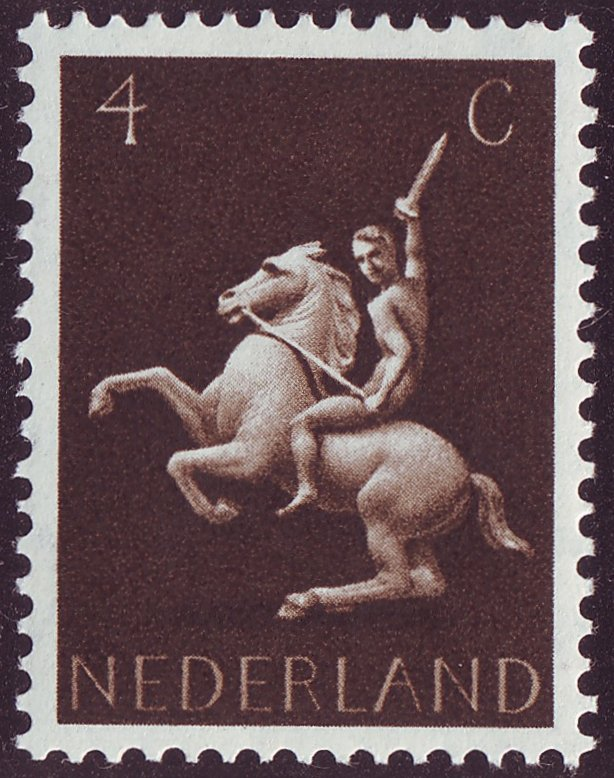
1943 stamp (design by Pyke Koch)

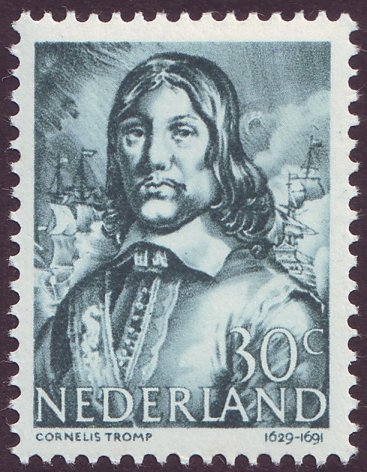
1944 stamp

== Post-war ==
The Netherlands were liberated on 5 May 1945. The previous stamps continued in use until a new series was introduced on 1 April 1946. This series contained stamps originally issued by the Dutch Government in Exile in Britain in 1944 for use on ships of the Dutch Navy serving with the Allies.

Regular stamp issues have continued since then, including several long-running definitive stamp series, numerous commemorative stamps and the regular issue of semi-postal stamps for charitable causes which has become a notable feature of Dutch philately.

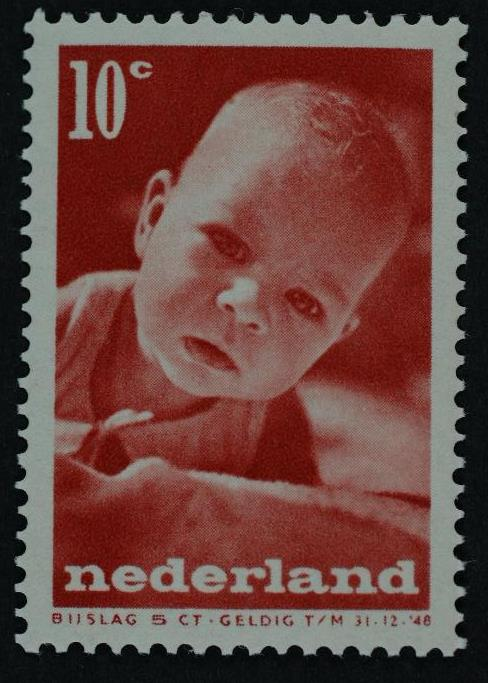
1947 stamp
(photo by Eva Besnyö)

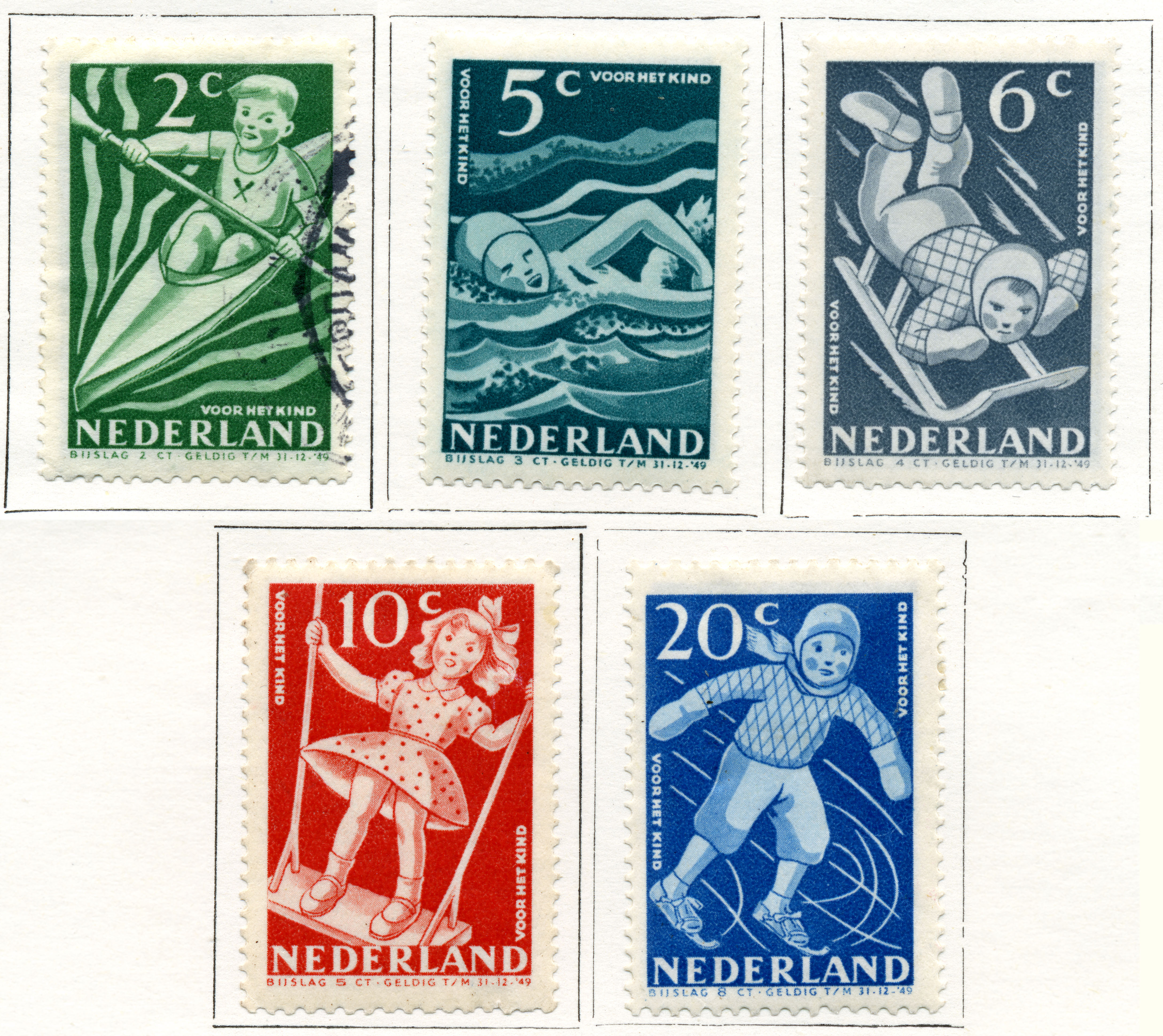
1948 stamps

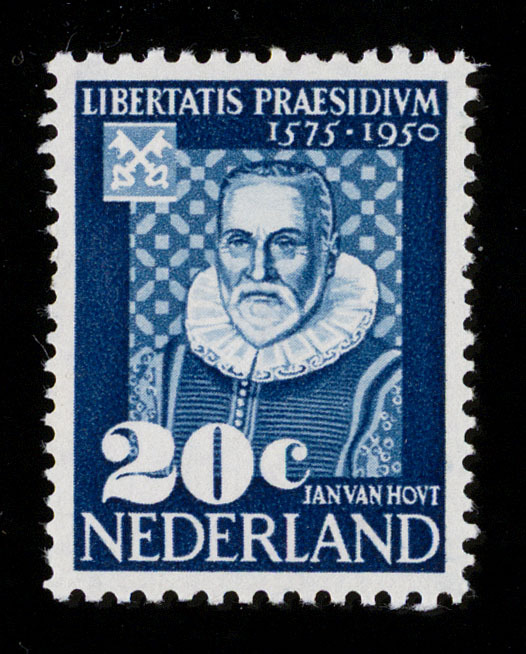
1950 stamp

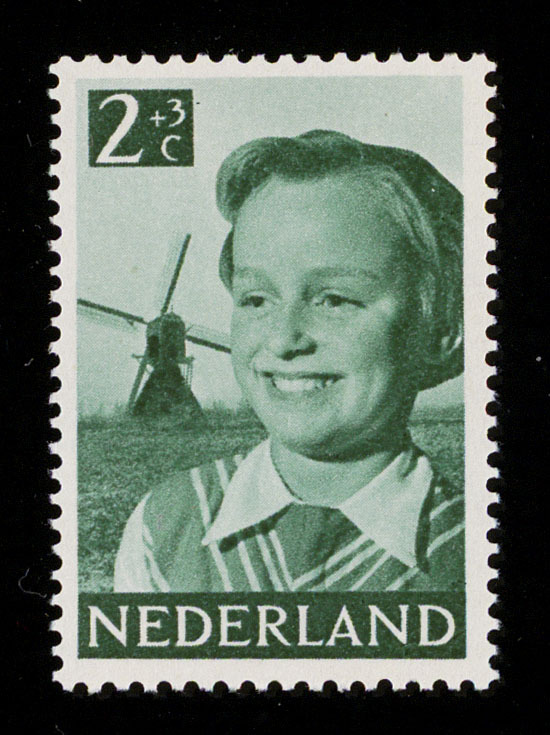
1951 stamp
(photo by Cas Oorthuys)

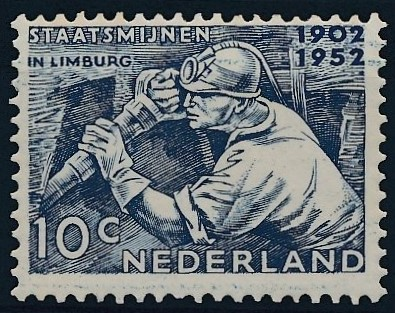
1952 stamp (design by Hubert Levigne)

== Provincial stamps ==
In 2002 a series of 12 provincial stamps were issued. Whilst not strictly local stamps, as they were valid throughout the Netherlands, the stamps were only available to purchase from post offices in the relevant province or from the Dutch Philatelic Bureau.

== Variable value stamps ==
Variable value stamps have been issued in the Netherlands since 1989.

== Stamp booklets ==
The Dutch Post Office has been an enthusiastic issuer of postage stamp booklets, issuing over 150 since the first one in 1902.

== International Court of Justice ==
A number of stamps have been issued since 1934 for use at the International Court of Justice in The Hague.

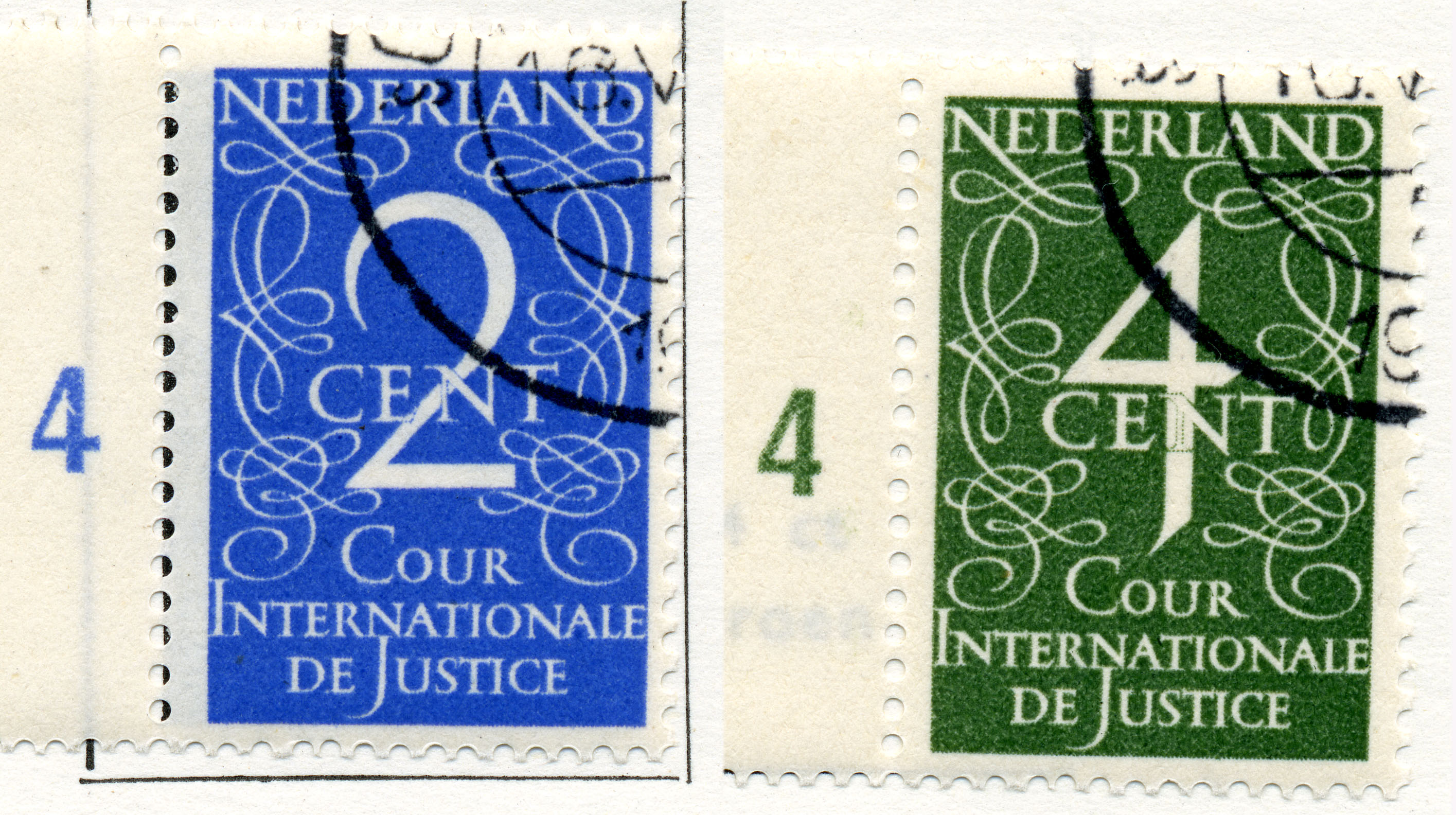
Stamp 1950 Int. Court
(design Jan van Krimpen)

== See also ==
- KNBF Bondsbibliotheek, a philatelic library of the Royal Dutch Association of Philatelic Societies
- List of people on stamps of the Netherlands
- Postage stamps and postal history of Aruba
- Postage stamps and postal history of the Caribbean Netherlands
- Postage stamps and postal history of Curaçao
- Postage stamps and postal history of the Netherlands Antilles
- Postage stamps and postal history of the Netherlands East Indies
- Postage stamps and postal history of Sint Maarten
- Postage stamps and postal history of Suriname
- Koninklijke TNT Post
- PostNL
