= Postage stamps and postal history of the Caribbean Netherlands =

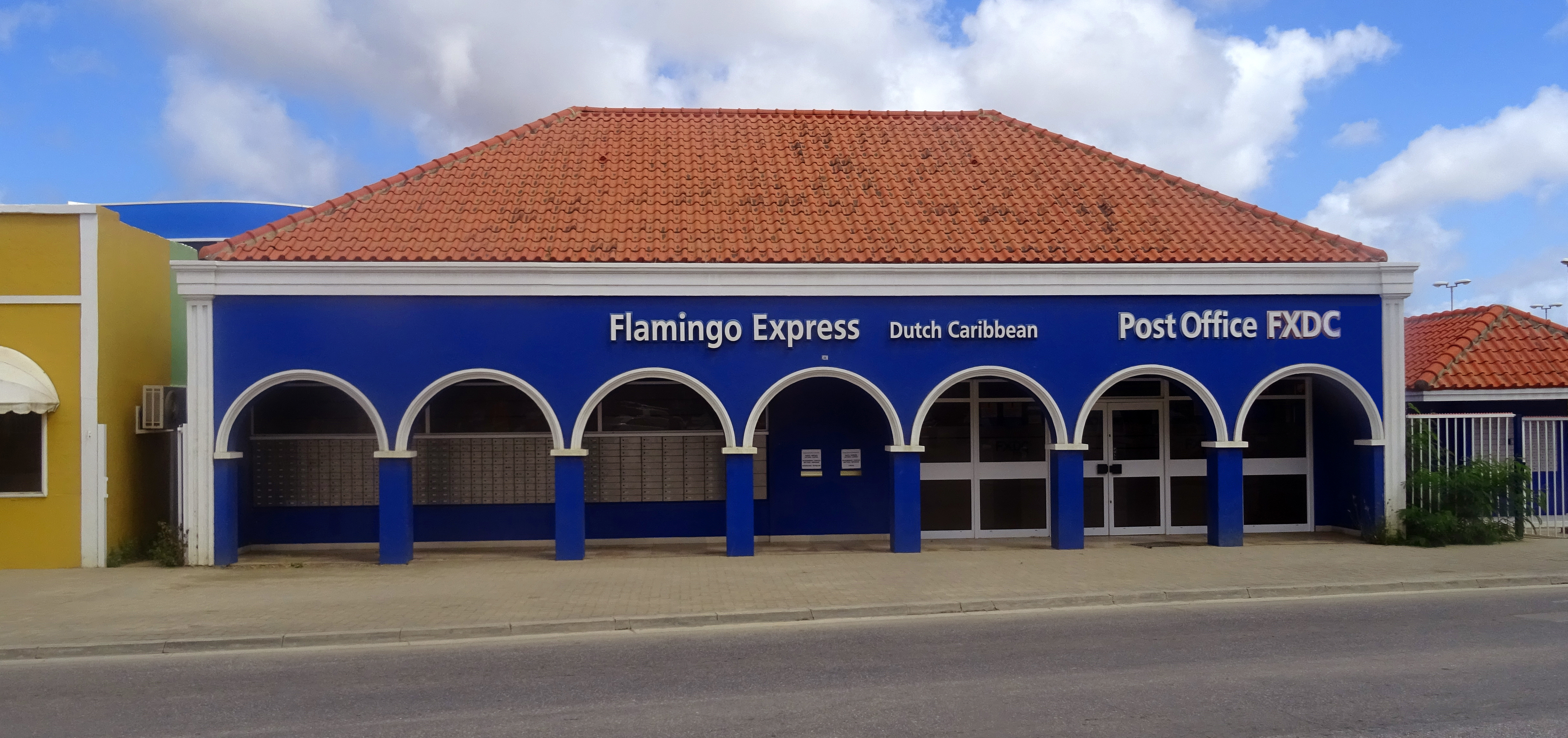
Flamingo Express Dutch Caribbean N.V, Plasa Reina Wilhelmina 11, Kralendijk, Bonaire

The three public bodies of Bonaire, Sint Eustatius and Saba started issuing postal stamps after the dissolution of the Netherlands Antilles in 2010. The islands form a separate postage region under the name Caribisch Nederland (English: Caribbean Netherlands).

The first stamp issued showed the maps of the three islands. Stamps of similar design were issued in the other newly formed postage regions of Sint Maarten and Curaçao.

The value of the previous stamps was denominated in Netherlands Antillean guilders, but was replaced by US-dollar denominated stamps in 2011 when the legal currency of the islands changed. After June 2011, new stamps are being issued by Post in US dollars. Since January 2014, FXDC, formerly Flamingo Communications N.V. has operated postal services in the Caribbean Netherlands, under a concession by the Dutch government, originally 10 years, before being extended in 2023 for a further three years.

Since 2014, stamps have been inscribed with the names of the individual islands.

== Postal codes proposal ==
The islands do not as yet have postal codes; the address, the town and the island are sufficient for sending post to either island (with "Caribbean Netherlands" as country when sent from abroad). However, following a consultation in the islands in 2024, the Dutch government announced plans to introduce postal codes on the islands similar in format to the postal code system used in the European Netherlands, to be introduced by the end of 2026. In the consultation, it was envisaged that the Caribbean Netherlands would be assigned postal codes in the series 0000 AA to 0999 ZZ. As a result, at the request of the Ministry of Housing and Spatial Planning, PostNL has reserved postal code range 0000-0999 for use on the islands, following an amendment to the postcode covenant, announced in the Staatscourant or Government Gazette.

== See also ==
- Postage stamps and postal history of the Netherlands
- Postage stamps and postal history of the Netherlands Antilles
