= Jean Pierre Moquette =

Dutch-born Javanese bookkeeper and researcher

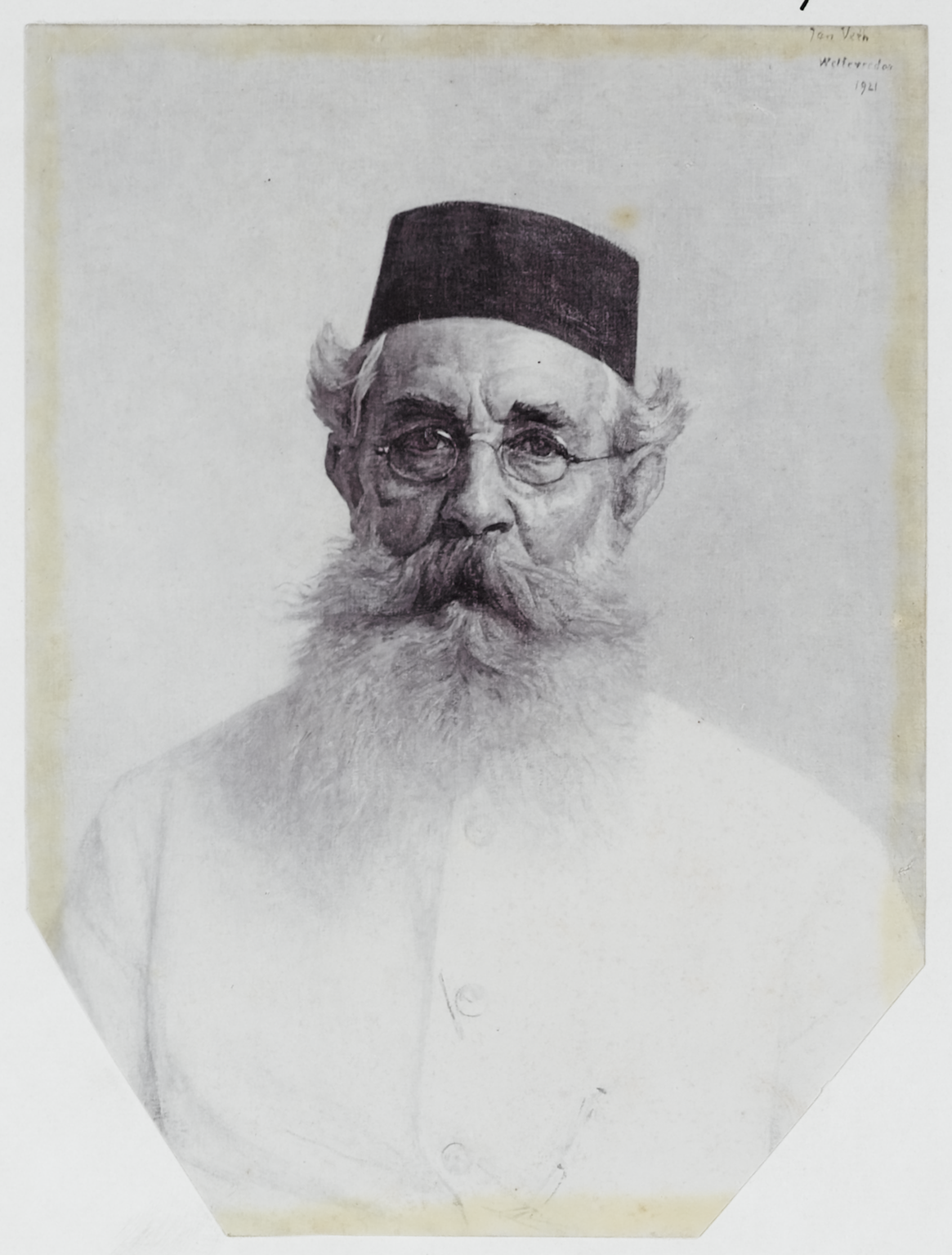
- Born: July 5, 1856; Goor, Netherlands
- Died: February 26, 1927 (aged 70); Weltevreden (now Sawah Besar), Central Jakarta, Dutch East Indies (now Indonesia)
- Occupations: Bookkeeper, Researcher, Stamp dealer, Coin dealer
- Awards: Officer of the Order of Orange-Nassau

Postcard from Moquette to Snouck Hurgronje (1909)

Jean Pierre Moquette (July 5, 1856 – February 26, 1927) moved from the Netherlands to Java in 1873. He worked as a bookkeeper at the sugar plantation and factory 'Kremboeng', in Sidoarjo near Surabaya. He was also a stamp and coin dealer in Surabaya. He became known for the alterations of stamps and postal stationery. Besides philately, numismatics and his bookkeeping work in the sugar business, he was a researcher in the field of sugar cane. For his research of cane sowing and crossing he was in 1898 appointed Officer of the Order of Orange-Nassau. In 1900 he founded the Indonesian Numismatic Cabinet in which he was active as curator. In the early 1900s he did ethnographic and historical research for which in 1924 he was appointed correspondent for the Royal Netherlands Academy of Arts and Sciences in Amsterdam.

The Dutch Tropen Museum has a painting of Moquette by Jan Pieter Veth.

== Philatelic creations ==
Starting with a handmade postmark Moquette soon produced elaborate cachets, overprints and postal stationery. He sold his items to collectors and some stamp dealers like Jean-Baptiste Moens. He added private framed text around the official imprints of stationery cards. In consequence, cards altered as such were officially declared invalid by July 29, 1878. When the Dutch Indies U.P.U. foreign postal card rate was reduced to 7 1/2 cents on 1 April 1879 the 12 1/2 cent card was redundant. Moquette provided a two line overprint in blue green reading '5 cent' and sent the cards to Europe for sale as a new surcharge variety. The Belgium dealer Moens was one of those to handle these cards and sold some of them in 1883 to collector Philipp von Ferrary. After 1890 there are no new records of Moquette creations.

Postal stationery is known with the cachet 'Forwarded by Moquette Ketegan Soerabaja', little is known however about forwarding activities of Moquette.

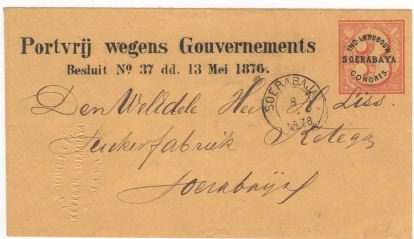
Moquette envelope for the third Agricultural Congress of 1878 at Soerabaija

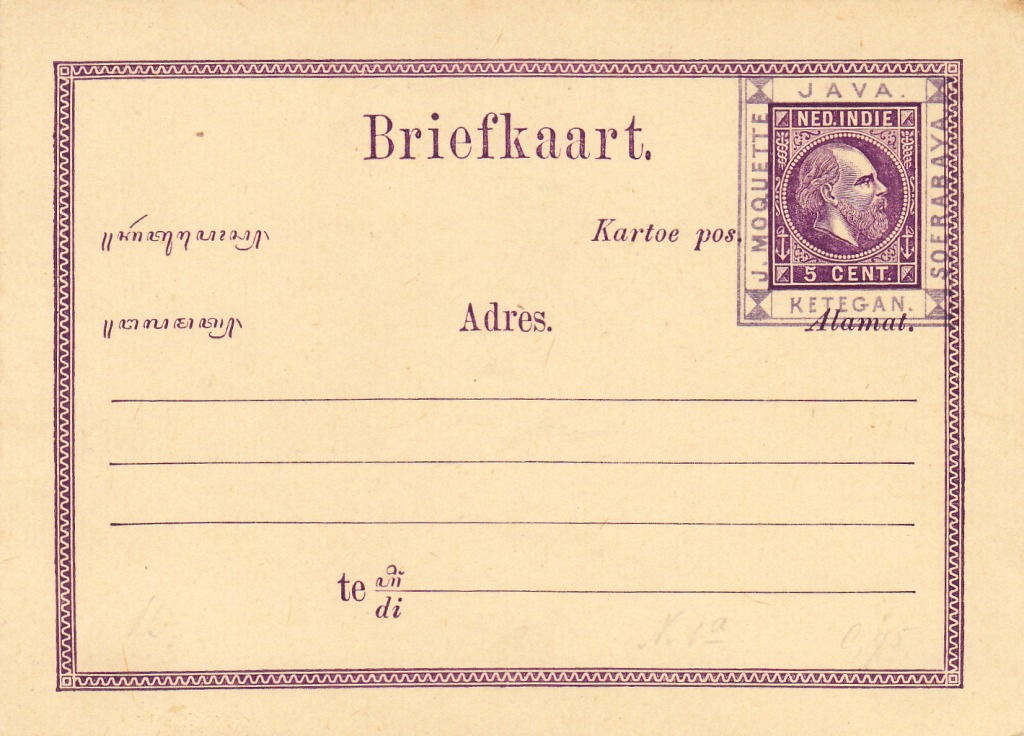
Moquette overprint on Dutch Indies 5 cent 1874 postal card

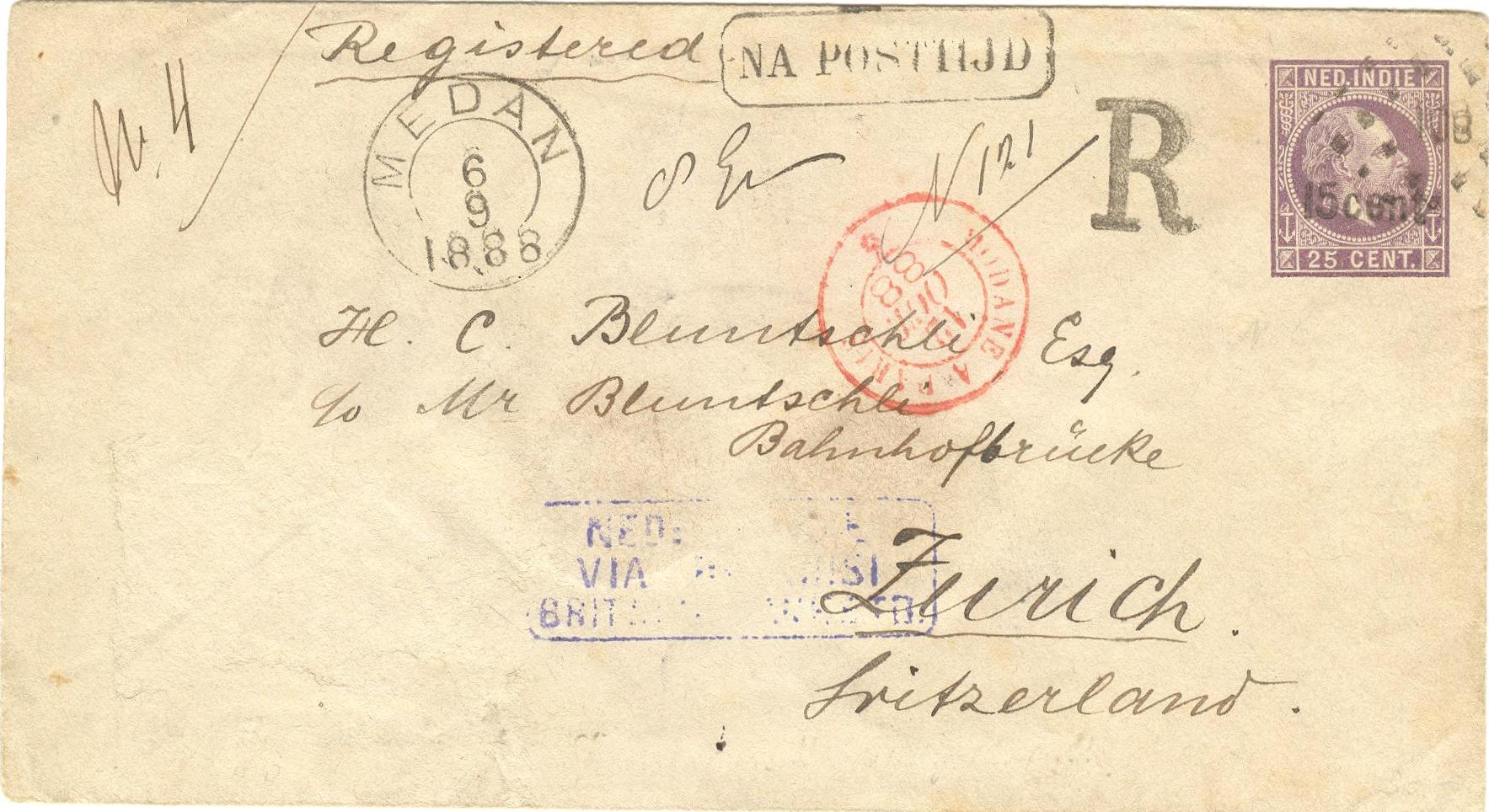
Moquette '15 cent' surcharge on 25 cent 1888 envelope

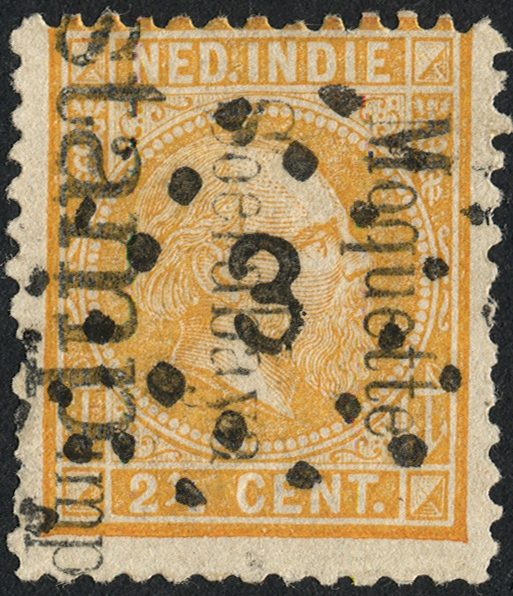
Moquette 'Soerabaya Stampimp(ort)' overprint on 2.5 cent stamp

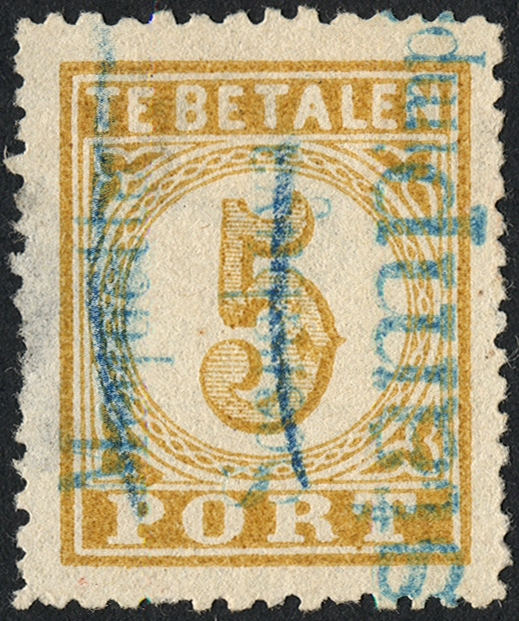
Moquette 'Soerabaya Stampimp(ort)' overprint on 5 cent 1874 postage due

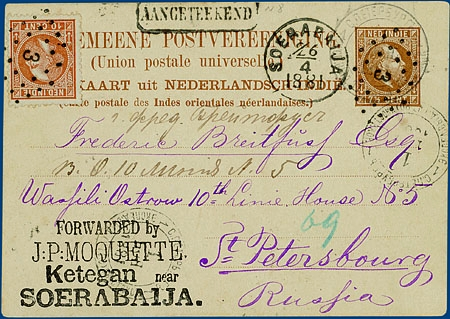
1881 Postal card to St. Petersburg bearing Moquette cachet: 'Forwarded by Moquette Ketegan Soerabaja'

== Indonesian Numismatic Cabinet ==
In 1900 he founded the Indonesian Numismatic Cabinet in which he was active as curator. He wrote the numismatic standard work "The coins of the Indies" which was published in the years 1906-1910 in the Journal of the Batavian Society of Arts and Sciences, and articles on the Hindu coins of Java.

== Ethnographic and historical research ==
In the early 1900s Moquette did ethnographic and historical research on Muslim tomb inscriptions and the ancient history of North Sumatra and the Malay peninsula. On 24 April 1924 he was appointed correspondent for the Royal Netherlands Academy of Arts and Sciences in Amsterdam for the "Afdeling Letterkunde" (department of literature).

== See also ==
- Postage stamps and postal history of the Netherlands East Indies
- Postage stamps and postal history of Indonesia

== Works cited ==
- Broekman, J.H. Geuzendam's catalogus (1961) De postzak.
- Bulterman, Paul. het Java provisorium (July 2003) De postzak.
- Costerus Pzn., W.P. Indische Poststukken met valschen opdruk (1925) Nederlandsch Maandblad voor Philatelie.
- Hermann, Ad. Aufdruck Briefkarte Geuzendam 3 von 1879 (Sept 15, 1888 Der Philatelist.
- Djajadiningrat, Hoessein. Moquette biographie (1927) Tijdschrift voor Indische Taal-, Land- en Volkenkunde. Koninklijk Bataviaasch Genootschap van Kunsten en Wetenschappen.
- Kruse, Hans. De creaties van J.P. Moquette, een overzicht. Website: posthistorie Nederlands Indië puntstempels 1874 - 1893 Online article Archived 2011-01-18 at the Wayback Machine
- Mulders, E.J.P. Jean Pierre Moquette (August 1965) Nederlandsch Maandblad voor Philatelie.
- Nederlandse Vereniging van Poststukken en Poststempel Verzamelaars Geuzendam’s Catalogus van de postwaardestukken van Nederland en Overzeese Rijksdelen. (7th ed. 1997, p. 76)
- Storm van Leeuwen, Peter. Geene Olla Podrida (December 2003) De postzak.
- Van der Vlist, H.W. Vervalste opdrukken op de Nederlands-Indische hulpuitgifte van 1902 en enige informatie over Moquette (Sept 2007) Filatelie.
- Weatley, Richard. Moquette, Used Examples of his Creations. Website ASPN. Online article
- Voss, A.C. Moquette (1926) Nederlandsch Maandblad voor Philatelie.
