= CPOST =

CPOST or Cpost may refer to:

- Chicago Project on Security and Threats, an international security affairs research institute based at the University of Chicago
- Cpost International, a postal services contractor operating in a number of countries including Curaçao, Sint Maarten
