= Caribbean Postal Union =

The Caribbean Postal Union (CPU) is an association established by treaty of the postal authorities of the following member countries: The bloc was established with the assistance of the European Union for member-states of CARIFORUM as part of the bloc of the African, Caribbean, and Pacific Group of States.

Anguilla (Anguilla Postal Service)
Antigua and Barbuda (Antigua Post Office)
Aruba (Post Aruba)
(The Bahamas) Bahamas (Bahamas Postal Service)
Barbados (Barbados Postal Service)
Belize (Belize Postal Service)
Bermuda (Bermuda Post Office)
British Virgin Islands (BVI Post)
Canada (Canada Post)
Caribbean Netherlands^{‡} (Nieuwe Post Nederlandse Antillen)

Bonaire
Sint Eustatius
(Saba (island)) Saba

Cayman Islands (Cayman Islands Postal Service)
Cuba (Groupo Empresarial Corres de Cuba)
Curaçao (Cpost International)
Dominica (General Post Office - GPO)

Dominican Republic (Instituto Postal Dominicano - INPOSDOM)
France (La Poste)
Grenada (Grenada Postal Corporation)
Guyana (Guyana Post Office Corporation)
Haiti (Post of Haiti Office/Office des Postes d'Haïti)
Jamaica (Jamaica Postal Corporation)
Montserrat (Montserrat Postal Service)
Netherlands (PostNL)
(Saint Kitts and Nevis) Saint Christopher (Saint Kitts) and Nevis (St. Kitts & Nevis Postal Services)
Saint Lucia (Saint Lucia Postal Service)
Sint Maarten (Postal Services St. Maarten N.V. - PSS)
Saint Vincent and the Grenadines (SVG Postal Corporation)
Suriname (Suriname Postal Corporation)
Trinidad and Tobago (T&T Postal Corporation - TTPOST)
Turks and Caicos Islands (TCI Postal and Philatelic Bureau Services)
United Kingdom (Royal Mail Group plc)
United States (United States Postal Service)

^{Note ‡} − Since 10 October 2010, the Feederation of the Netherlands Antilles was dissolved into Curaçao, Sint Maarten who voted to become countries, (just like Aruba), and the three public bodies of the Caribbean Netherlands per outcome of referendum. During the dissolution ceremony in Curacao, attended by then Crown Prince Willem-Alexander, the flag of the Netherlands Antilles was lowered with the flag of Curaçao raised in its place. Each part of the former Netherlands Antilles adopted their own separate flags as a result. The other three islands: Bonaire, Sint Eustatius and Saba (the "BES islands") have voted to become "special municipalities" of the Netherlands (proper).

It was founded in 1997 as a restricted union of the Universal Postal Union.

In 2000 it was decided by the union's members in attendance for the CPU to be headquartered in Castries, Saint Lucia. Sited therein is the secretariat for the regional coordinator for the Universal Postal Union and the technical officer for the Caribbean Postal Union.

In 2022 the CPU formed a think tank with the goal to improve transport of mail throughout the Caribbean. Decisions by the union are undertaken by the bloc's annual meetings.

== Annual meetings ==
- 2002–6th Conference - East Coast, Demerara, Guyana - 22–27 July 2002.
- 2003–7th Conference - Cayman Islands - 23–27 June 2003.
- 2004–8th Conference - United States Virgin Islands - June 2004.
- 2006–10th Conference - Saint Vincent and the Grenadines - 12–16 June 2006.
- 2010–13th Conference - East Coast, Demerara, Guyana - 6–9 September 2010.
- 2011–14th Conference - Curaçao - September 2011.
- 2013–16th Conference - Saint Kitts and Nevis - 10–14 June.
- 2014–17th Conference - Bermuda - 8–11 September 2014.
- 2015–18th Conference - Tortola, British Virgin Islands - 14–18 September 2015.
- 2016–19th Conference - Saint Lucia - 9–13 July 2022.
- 2017–20th Conference - Guadeloupe - 19–24 June 2017.
- 2018–21st Conference - Saint Lucia - September 9–13, 2018.
- 2019–22nd Conference - Havana, Cuba—26-27 June 2019.
- 2022–24th Conference - St. Lucia 18–22 July 2022.
- 2023–25th Conference - Jamaica - 11–14 September 2023.

== See also ==
- British West Indies
- Dutch West Indies
- French West Indies
- CARIFORUM
- Asia-Pacific Telecommunity
- Asian-Pacific Postal Union
- Association of Caribbean States (ACS)
- African, Caribbean and Pacific Group of States (ACP)
- United Nations Postal Administration
- Postal Union of the Americas, Spain and Portugal
- European Conference of Postal and Telecommunications Administrations (CEPT)
- List of members of the Universal Postal Union
