= Postage stamps and postal history of the Netherlands Antilles =

This is a survey of the postage stamps and postal history of the postal areas Netherlands Antilles as well as its predecessor Curaçao. The area consisted of the islands Bonaire, Saba and Sint Eustatius (now part of the Netherlands as postal area "Caribbean Netherlands") as well as Sint Maarten, Curaçao and Aruba (which each are separate postal areas).

Early mail service in the islands of the Kingdom of the Netherlands in the Caribbean consisted of carriage by casual ship, and a number of letters are recorded from this period. A British post office operated during the occupation of 1807 to 1815. In 1825, the Dutch government established a post office at Willemstad; from then until 1834 a packet operated between there and Hellevoetsluis. From 1842 to 1854, mail was carried by British packets, and after 1854 by the Royal Mail Steam Packet Company, until 1885.

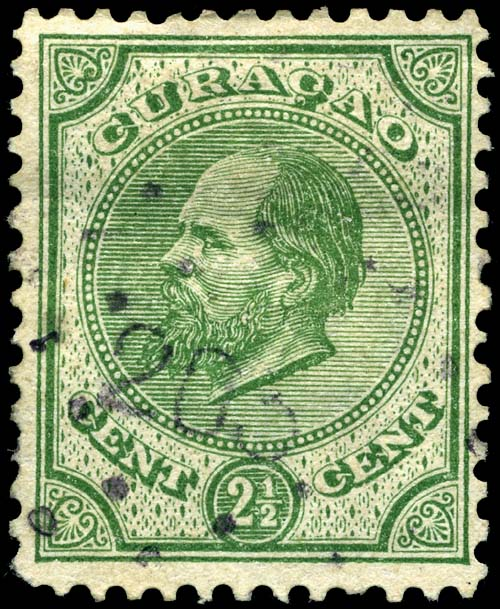
2 1/2 cents, 1873

== Curaçao (1873–1950) ==
The first postage stamps of Curaçao (the name was used for the six islands collectively when the area was named Curaçao and Dependencies and Territory of Curaçao) were issued 23 May 1873; they depicted William III in profile, and were inscribed "CURAÇAO", as were all issues for the next 77 years. The six original values (2 1/2c to 50c) were joined by a 2.50-gulden value in 1879, a 12 1/2c in 1886, and four more values in 1889. All of these were issued without gum (due to the heat and humidity) until 1890.

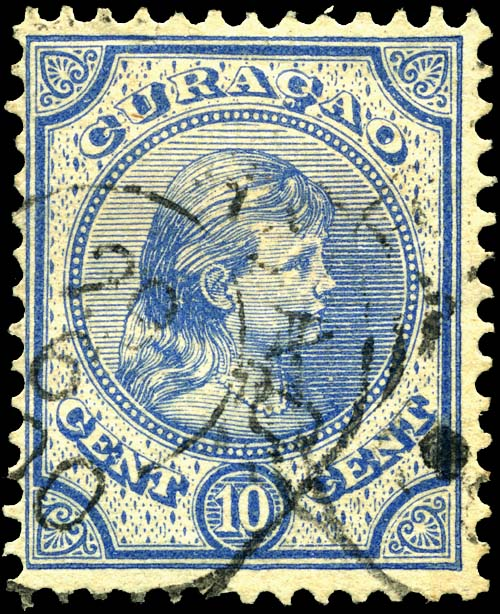
Wilhelmina as a girl, 1895 10c

In 1889 a longstanding tradition began with the issuance of low-value (1c to 5c) stamps showing only a large numeral. In 1891 the 30c value was surcharged 25c. Meanwhile, the passing of William left his daughter Wilhelmina to be among the youngest persons depicted on a stamp to that date, with five values appearing between 1892 and 1896. Only the vignette actually changed.

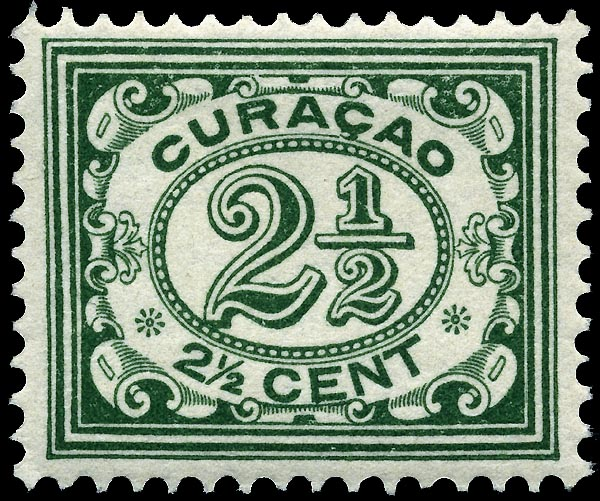
2 1/2c, 1915

Additional surcharges were needed periodically; 2 1/2c in 1895, and in 1901/1902 they were applied to stamps of the Netherlands. A new definitive series came out in 1904, with numeral in a horizontal layout for low values, and Wilhelmina in a circular frame for the higher values. Additional values were added in 1906 and 1908.

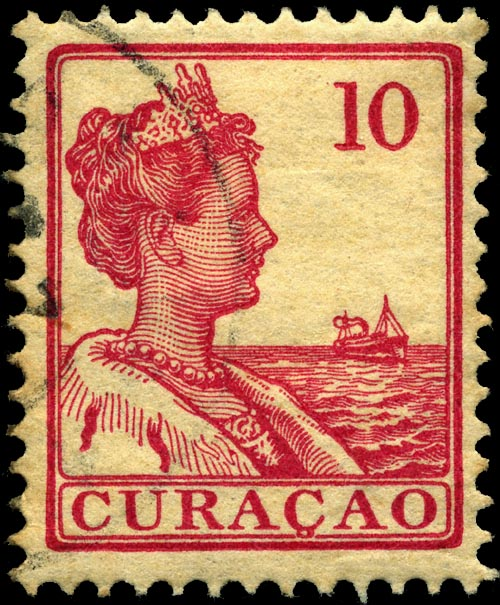
10c, 1915

In 1915 a new series reused designs from the Netherlands Indies stamps of a few years previously. The low-value numbers were changed to have a white instead of a hatched background, for readability, while medium values showed the Queen and a ship at sea, with the highest values showing the Queen flanked by palm trees. These stamps continued as the standard for many years, with some values getting color changes; for instance, the 5c was originally rose, then changed to green in 1922, then to lilac in 1926.

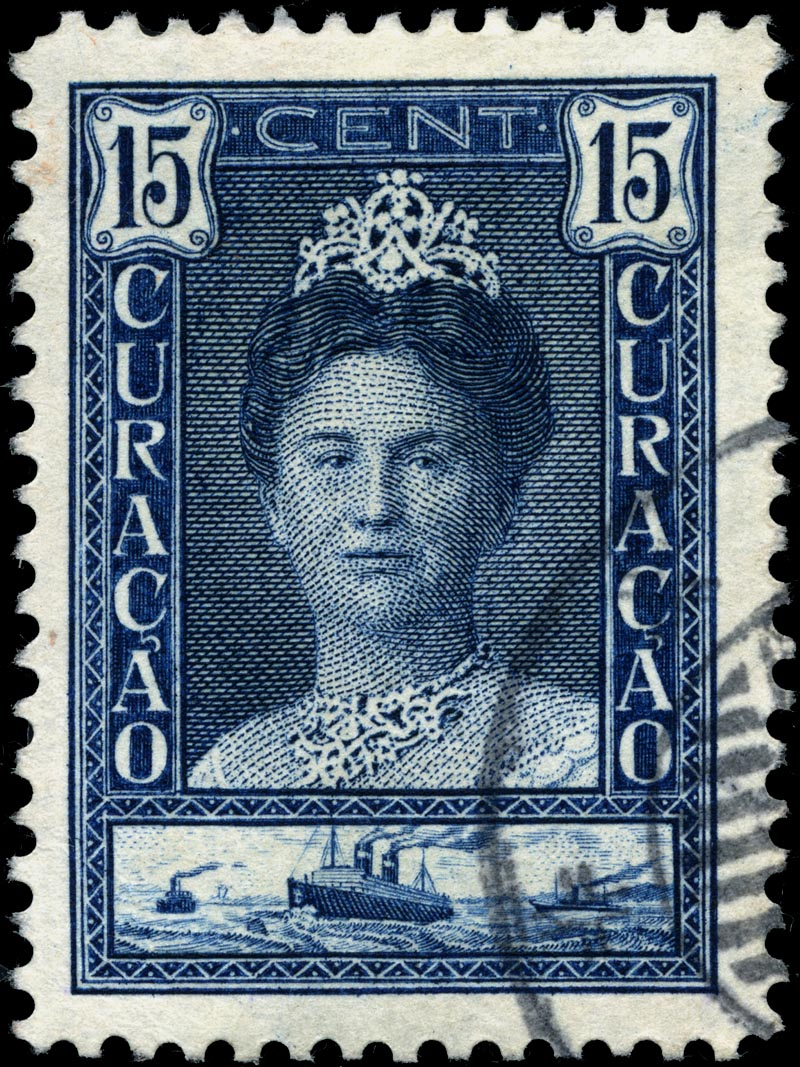
15c, 1928

The first commemorative stamps, in 1923, celebrated Wilhelmina's 25th anniversary, depicting her with a finely-engraved portrait. The portrait was reused in the definitive series of 1928, which added a steamship to the bottom of the design.

In 1934, a series of 17 types marked the 300th anniversary of the colony; designs included portraits of figures significant in history, plus a view of Van Walbeecks' ship.

1936 saw a new definitive series, with the usual lower values as numerals, now vertical in an oval frame, while from 10c on up was a profile of Wilhelmina wearing a sort of shawl or veil drawn back; a depiction of the Queen not seen any other stamps of the Dutch area.

15c, 1941

The 40th anniversary issue in 1938 and the definitives of 1941/1942/1947 reverted to the use of the same profiles of Wilhelmina as the Netherlands and the Netherlands Indies.

Commercial over sent from San Nicolas on Aruba to New York in 1948, using airmail stamps of 1947 and 1942

A set of 15 airmail stamps in October 1942 were bi-colored designs showing airplanes, maps, and scenery in various combinations; they were soon followed by set of six regular issues in 1943 that were also bi-colored, each with a scenic view of a different island. A last set of airmail stamps appeared in 1947, the lower values a stylized plane and posthorn design, and the higher showing a DC-4 skimming the waves.

A 1948 set of 11, showing white-haired Wilhelmina in profile, quickly became dated as Queen Juliana was invested with the crown in September; she appeared on a pair of stamps commemorating the occasion in September.

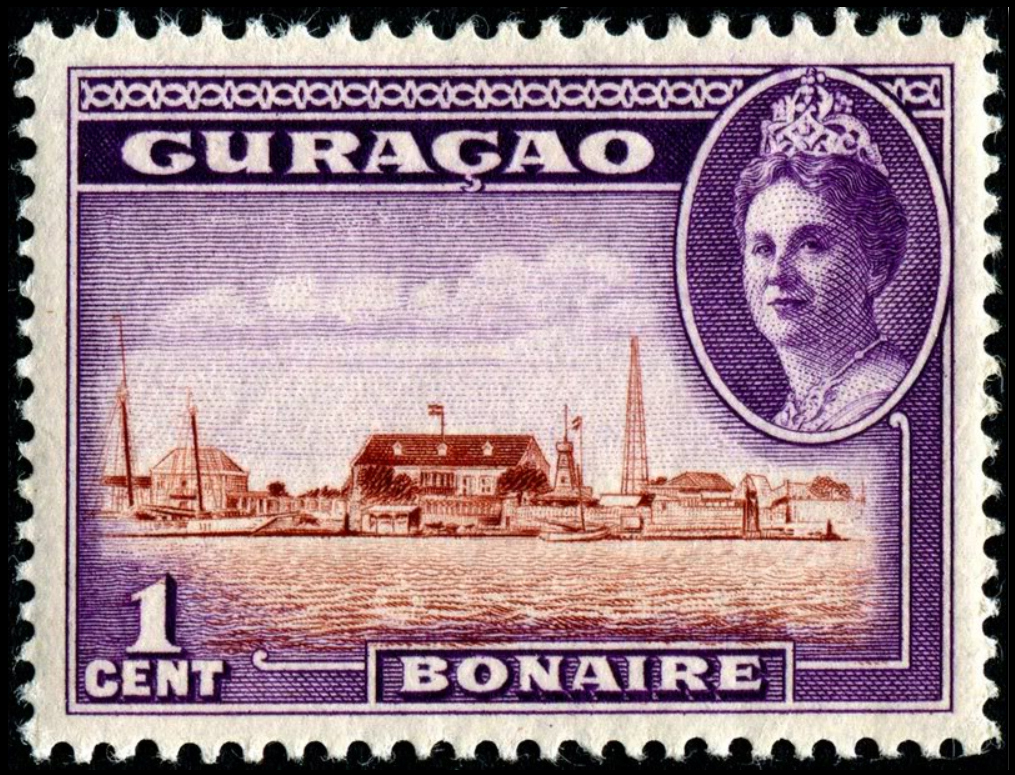

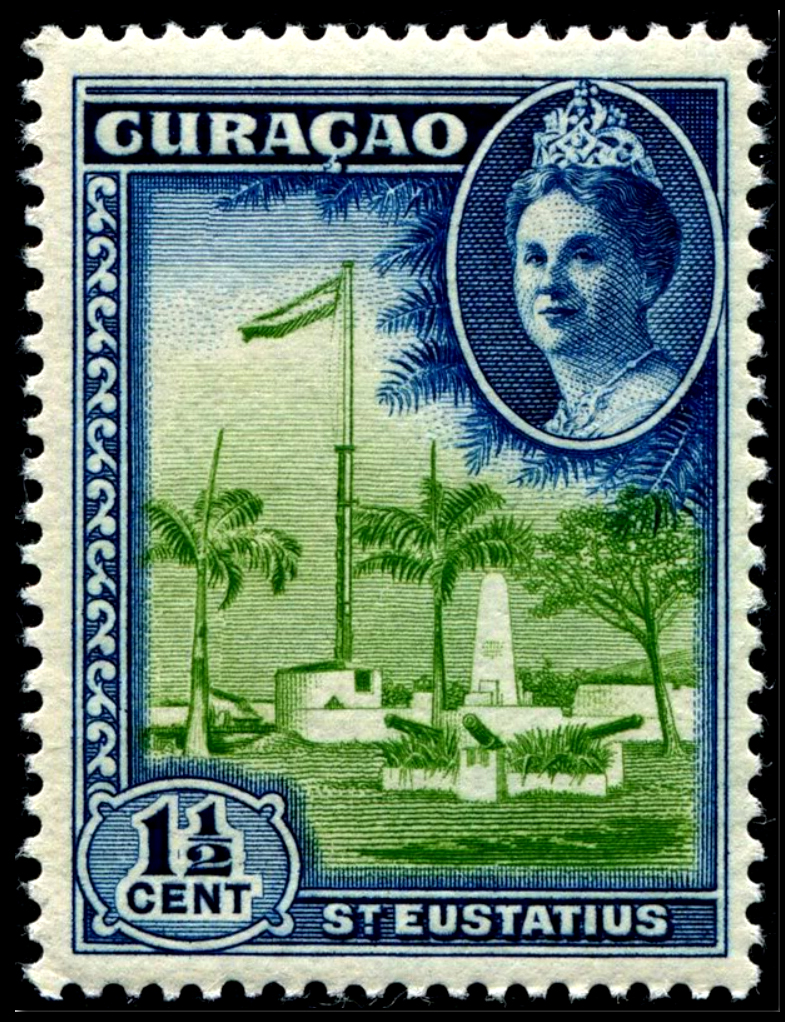

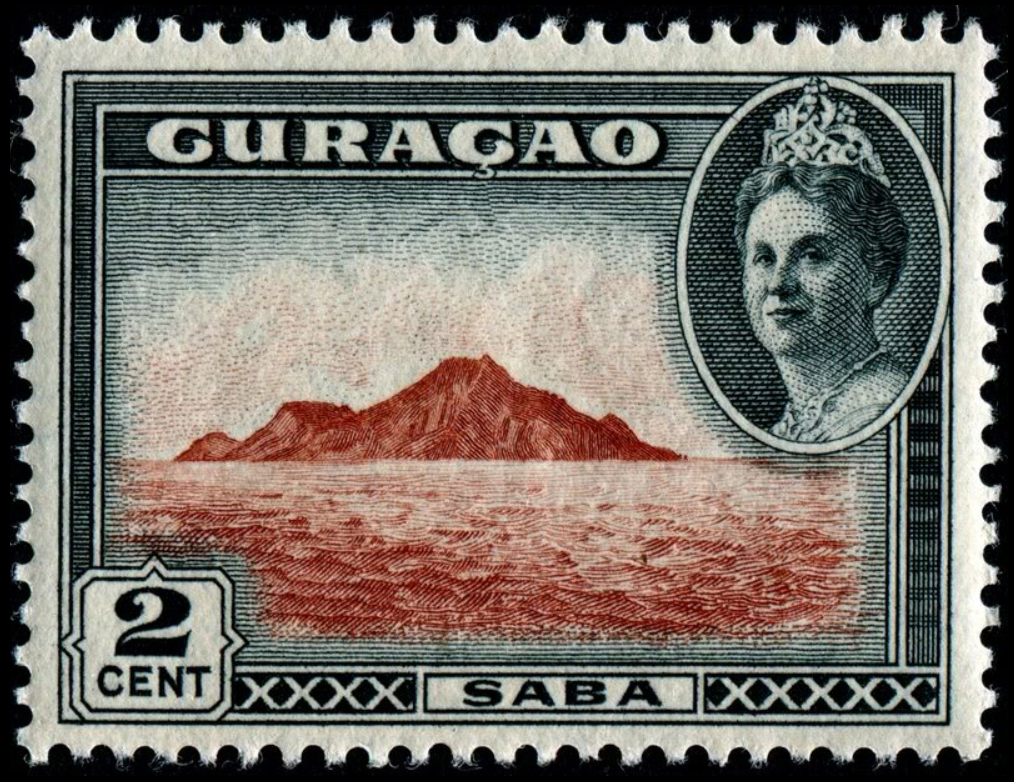

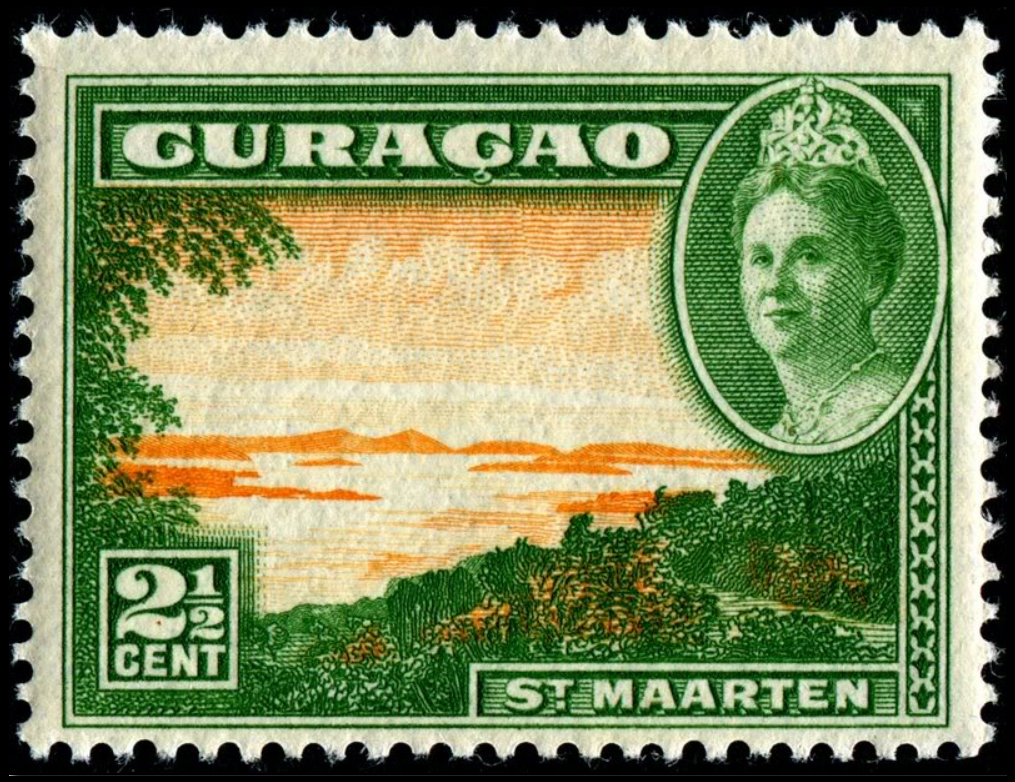

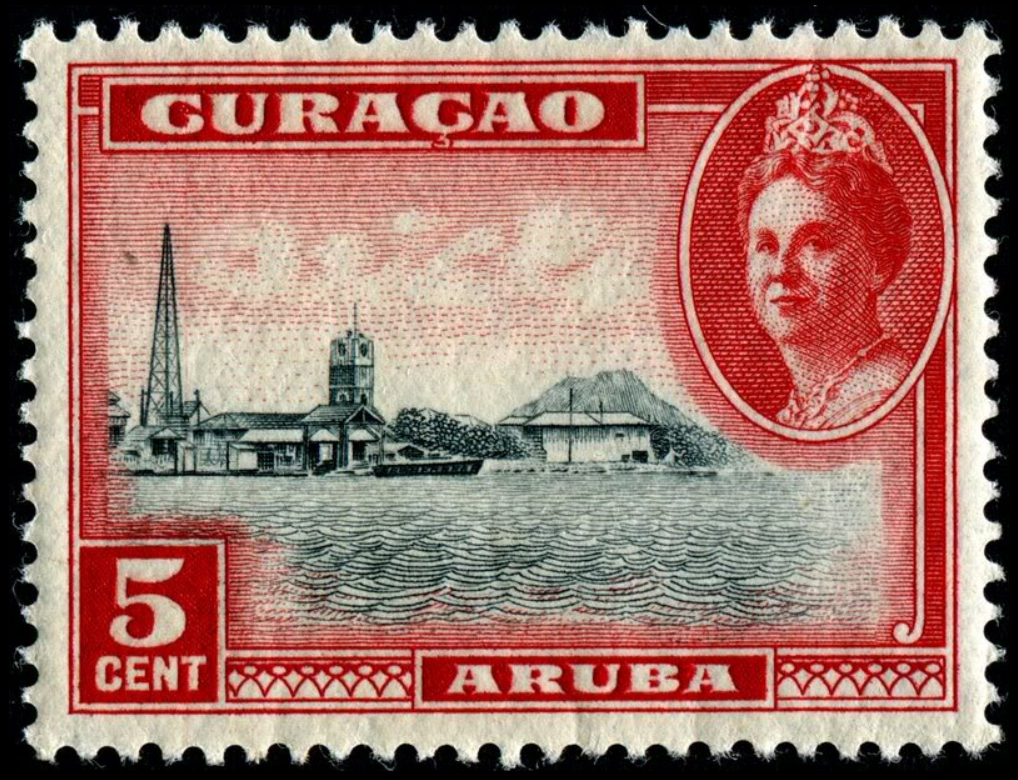

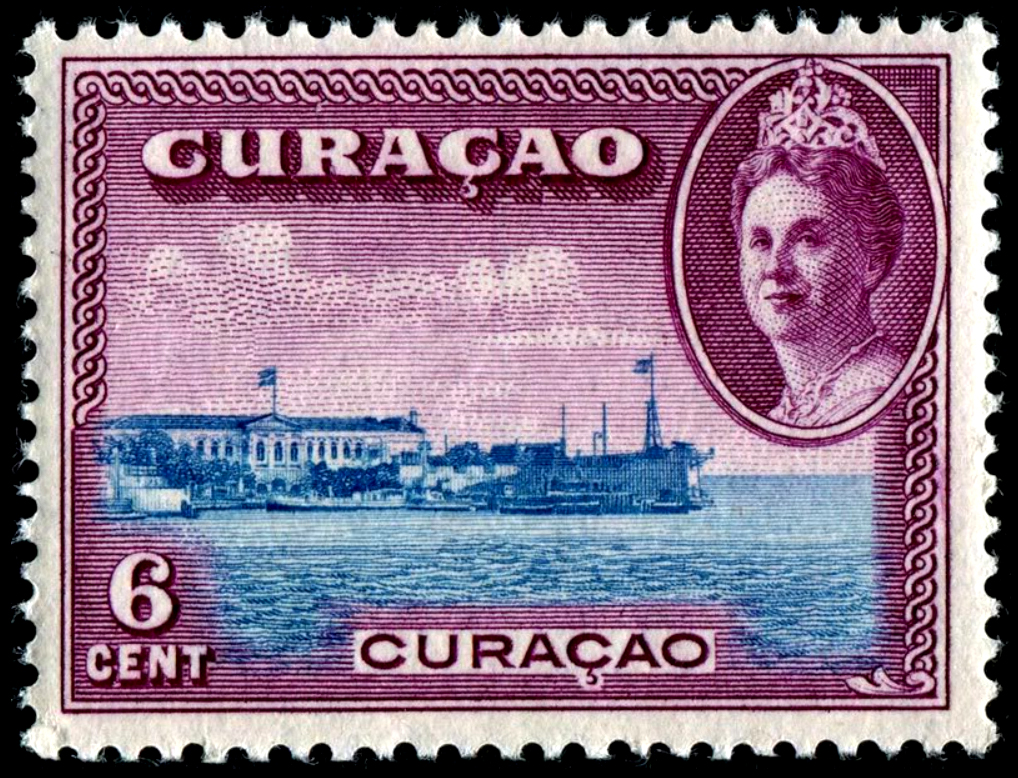

15c, 1958; "green and lilac" variation on the usual "green and light ultramarine"

== Netherlands Antilles (1950–2010) ==
6c, 1950; first regular issue for the "Netherlands Antilles"

1989 stamp showing a cruise ship in the bay of St Maarten; photographic detail and the stamp's date identifies it as Royal Caribbean's Sovereign of the Seas

The name of the colony officially changed in 1949, and was first inscribed in two stamps issued in October for the 74th anniversary of the UPU. The name change also entailed new definitives, which began appearing in 1950, using the same design as issued for the Netherlands the previous year, but inscribed "NED. ANTILLEN".

A handful of commemoratives appeared during the 1950s, and then 1958 new definitives adopted a simple and artistic designs representing the different islands. The designs continued in use for many years, with new sets of (higher) values supplementing the originals in 1973 and 1977.

The numbers of stamps issued each year gradually crept upward, but still at a relatively restrained pace. The focus of issues was generally on local wildlife and tourism themes.

After Aruba obtained the status of country in the Kingdom of the Netherlands, it formed its own postal area.

=== After the dissolution ===
After the dissolution of the Netherlands Antilles, three issuing identities formed: Curaçao, Sint Maarten and the Caribbean Netherlands.

== See also ==
- Postage stamps and postal history of Aruba
- Postage stamps and postal history of the Caribbean Netherlands
- Postage stamps and postal history of Curaçao
- Postage stamps and postal history of Sint Maarten
- Postage stamps and postal history of the Netherlands

== References and sources ==
Sources

- Frank W. Julsen and A. M. Benders, A Postal History of Curaçao and the other Netherlands Antilles (The Hague: Van Dieten, 1976) The most comprehensive work on the subject.
- Stanley Gibbons Ltd: various catalogues
- AskPhil – Glossary of Stamp Collecting Terms
- Encyclopaedia of Postal History
