= Henry Stolow =

American stamp dealer

Henry Stolow (Latvian: Henrijs Stolovs/Heinrihs Stolovs; 1901 in Riga, Governorate of Livonia, Russian Empire – 1971) was a stamp dealer in Berlin, New York, and Munich who was behind the issue of numerous stamps of doubtful validity.

== Early life ==
From 1920 to 1933, Stolow worked as a stamp dealer in Berlin, together with his brother Julius Stolow.

== Wholesale stamp business ==
In 1936, Henry and Julius emigrated to Brussels, and later to New York. There, they founded the wholesale company J. and H. Stolow, Wholesale Stamp Dealers, which existed until the 1970s. Their company became one of the world's largest stamp wholesalers.

Henry Stolow bought important stamp collections and auctioned them by order of the customer (for example the collections of President Franklin D. Roosevelt, King Carol II of Romania, King Farouk of Egypt, Cardinal Francis Spellman, and Arthur Hind). He also worked as a philatelic expertiser.

== Stamps of doubtful validity ==
Henry Stolow prepared new stamp issues for postal administrations (first of all in Africa). He then bought the major part of the edition in order to resell the stamps to other wholesalers. He may have deliberately ordered printing errors, as well as overprints (e.g. Greenland).

He also was involved with bogus stamp issues for the Republic of South Maluku (Indonesian: Republik Maluku Selatan, RMS), the RMS was a self-proclaimed republic in the Maluku Islands, which was founded on 25 April 1950. The main islands were Seram, Ambon, and Buru. The RMS on Ambon was defeated by Indonesian forces in November 1950, however, armed struggle continued on the island of Seram until December 1963. The government-in-exile continues to exist to this day in the Netherlands.

== Later life ==
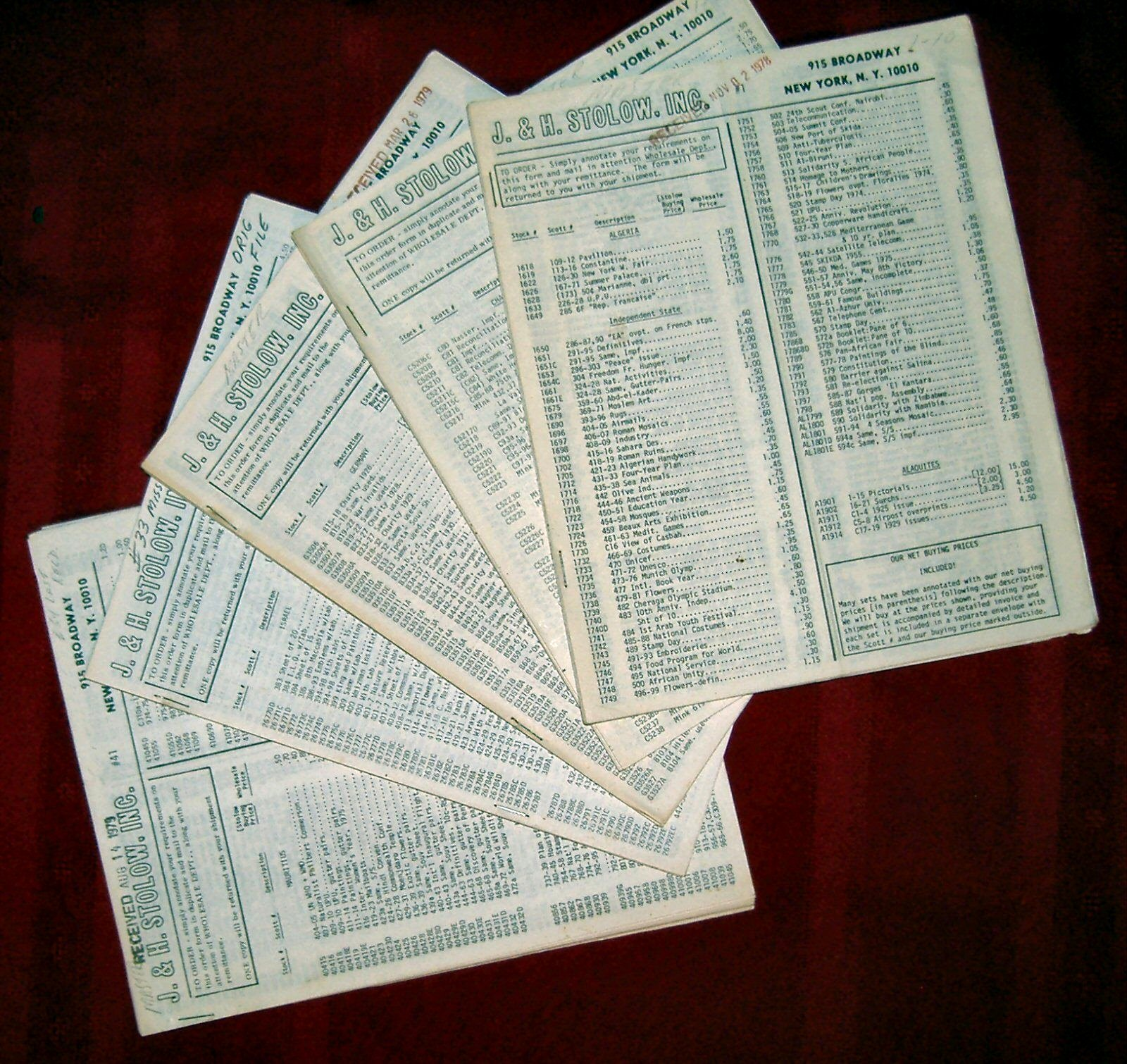
Price lists of J & H Stolow Inc., New York, 1978 and 1979.

After World War II, he returned to Germany and worked as a stamp dealer in Berlin and later in Munich. After his death, his Munich stamp empire was continued under the name Firma Henry Stolow by the owner, Rolf Müller.

Gregory Stolow, son of Julius Stolow and nephew of Henry Stolow, is a stamp dealer in the United States.

== See also ==
- Postage stamps and postal history of South Moluccas

== References and sources ==
Sources

- Briefmarken-Mauritius, No. 38/1971
- Ulrich Häger: Großes Lexikon der Philatelie, Bertelsmann Lexikon-Verlag, Gütersloh-Berlin-Munich-Vienna 1973 (p. 275 Maluku Selatan, p. 449 Henry Stolow).
- FFE 7 p. 58
