= Postage stamps and postal history of Timor-Leste =

One of the first stamps of Timor-Leste, showing the new country's flag

Timor-Leste, officially the Democratic Republic of Timor-Leste (formerly East Timor), is a country in Southeast Asia. It comprises the eastern half of the island of Timor, the nearby islands of Atauro and Jaco, and Oecusse, an exclave on the northwestern side of the island, within Indonesian West Timor. East Timor was a Portuguese colony, known as Portuguese Timor, until 28 November 1975.

== First stamps ==
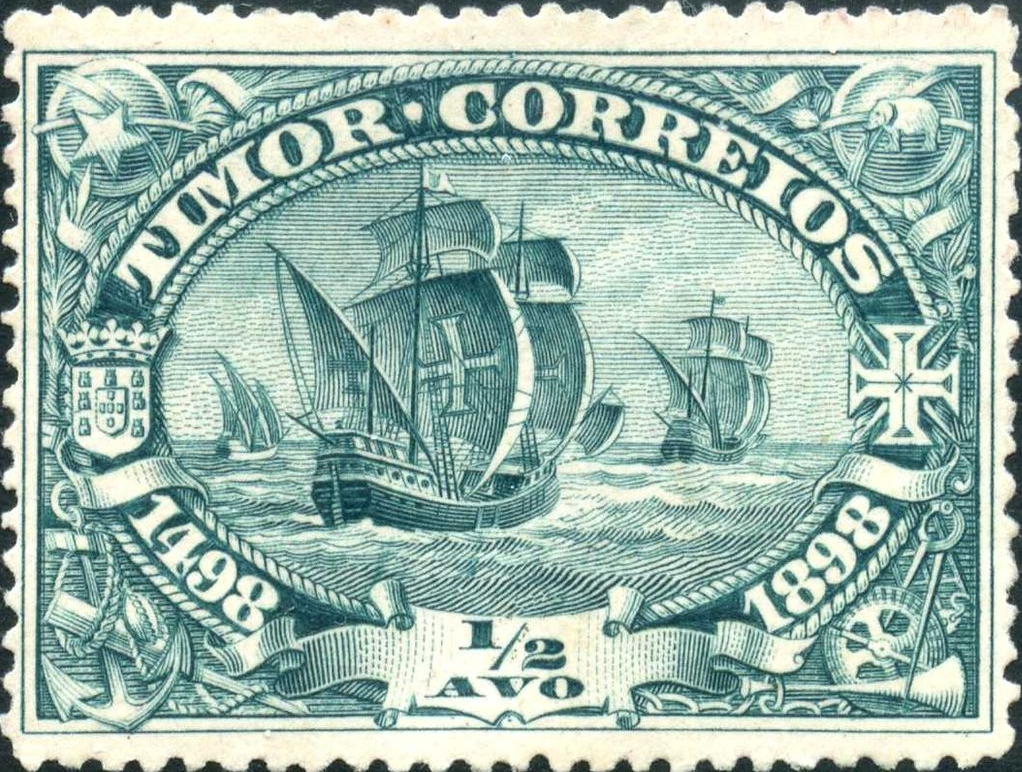
An 1898 Portuguese Timor stamp commemorating Vasco da Gama's voyage to India

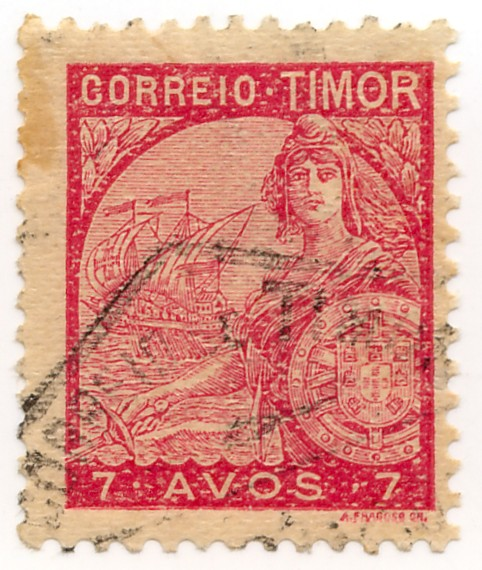
The 1933 series depicting São Gabriel

The first Portuguese colonial issues for Portuguese Timor were overprinted on stamps of Macau in 1884. A definitive set was issued in 1886.

== Indonesian occupation ==
During the Indonesian occupation of East Timor from 1975 to 1999, Indonesian stamps were in use.

== United Nations administration ==
Following the outcome of the East Timor Special Autonomy Referendum, United Nations transitional administration was established in 1999 until Timor-Leste's independence on 20 May 2002. During the transition period, two stamps were issued in 2000, one for domestic mail and one for international mail.

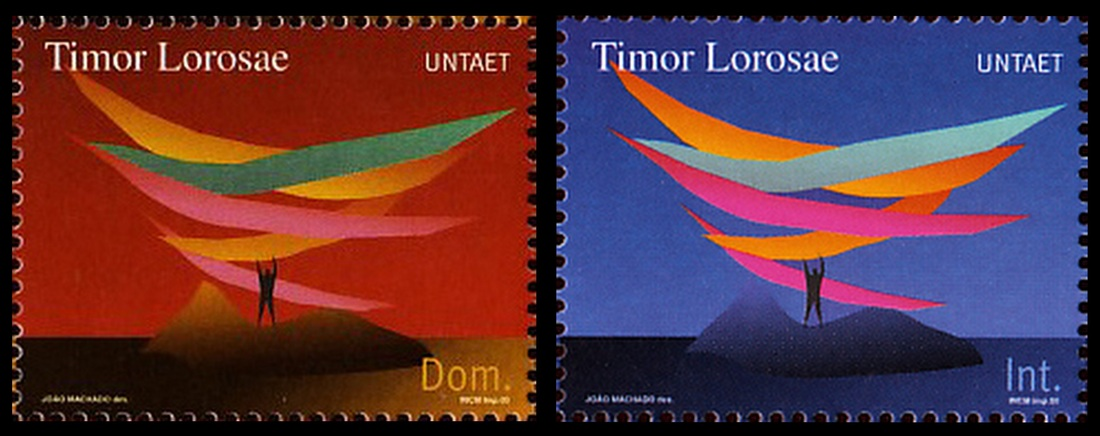
UNTAET East Timor domestic and international postage stamps

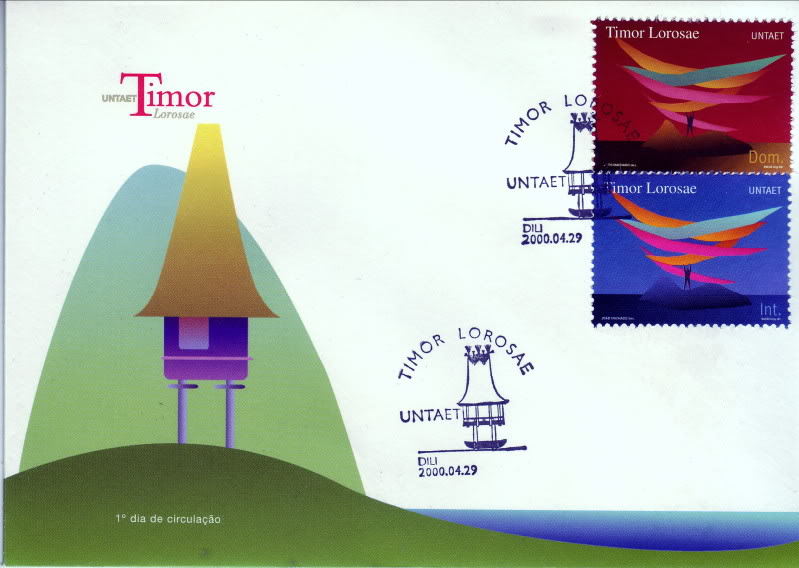
UNTAET East Timor first day cover 29 April 2000

== Independence ==
The first stamps of independent Timor-Leste were issued on 20 May 2002 and were produced by Australia Post.

== See also ==
- Correios de Timor-Leste, the national postal authority of Timor-Leste
- Postage stamps and postal history of Indonesia
