= Postage stamps and postal history of Indonesia =

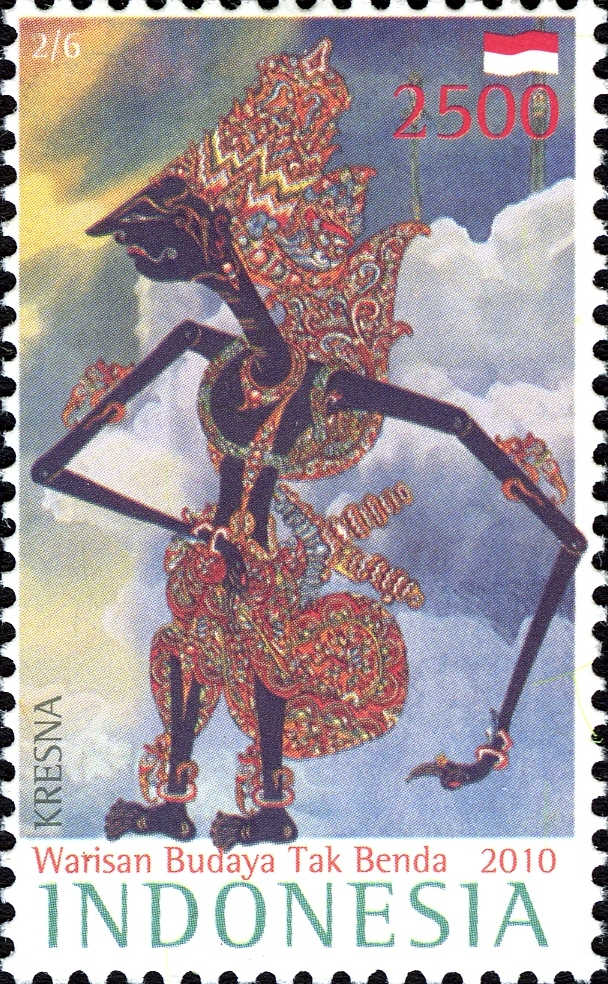
A 2010 stamp celebrating cultural heritage of Indonesia

This is a survey of the postage stamps and postal history of Indonesia.

Indonesia is a country in Southeast Asia and Oceania, consisting of 17,508 islands. With a population of nearly 280 million people, it is the world's fourth most populated country.

== History ==
The Indonesia Post Administration was formally established on 27 September 1945, but the history of Indonesian stamps began on 1 April 1864 with the release of the first Dutch East Indies stamp. The history of Indonesian stamps can be divided into five broad periods.

=== Dutch East Indies ===
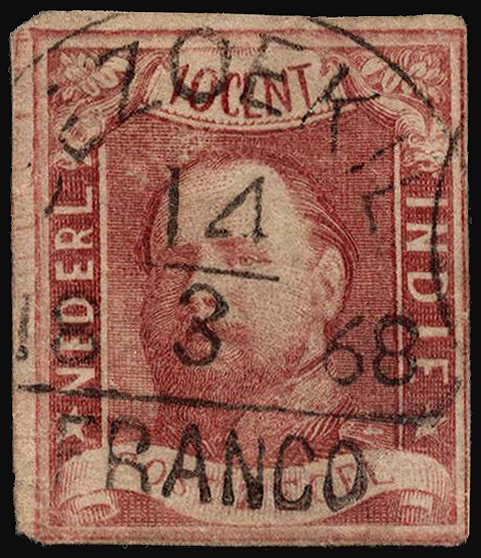
First Dutch Indies stamp issued on 1 April 1864

The first postage stamp in the Dutch East Indies was printed in Utrecht, the Netherlands, on 1 April 1864. The stamp showed a picture of King Willem III of the Netherlands and had a face value of ten cents. It was designed by T. W. Kaiser. Until 1920, stamp designs only showed pictures of the King and Queen and were primarily shown using typographic design. In 1921, a new series known as the ‘Brandkast’ series and was specially printed to serve as additional postage for sending sea mail in waterproof iron chests. Stamps issued in later years began to show the culture and geography of the Indonesian archipelago. During the Dutch East Indies period, the stamps were printed in the Netherlands by the firm of Joh. Enschedé & Zoner of Haarlem, and some printing was done in Batavia (Jakarta) by Reproductiebedrijf Topografische Dienst. The stamps were mostly printed in one or two colors.

=== Japanese occupation ===
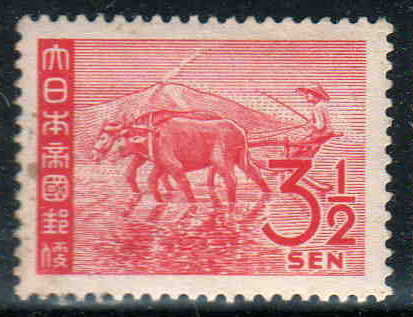
A stamp issued during the Japanese occupation, 1943

The Japanese military government did not immediately issue new stamps. The quickest solution was to overprint the many remaining Dutch colonial stamps. Definitive stamps began to be issued in 1943 and showed a traditional house, a dancer, a temple and a view of rice field. Some were designed by Dick Ruhl, and some by Basuki Abdullah, one of Indonesia's most famous painters.

=== War of independence ===
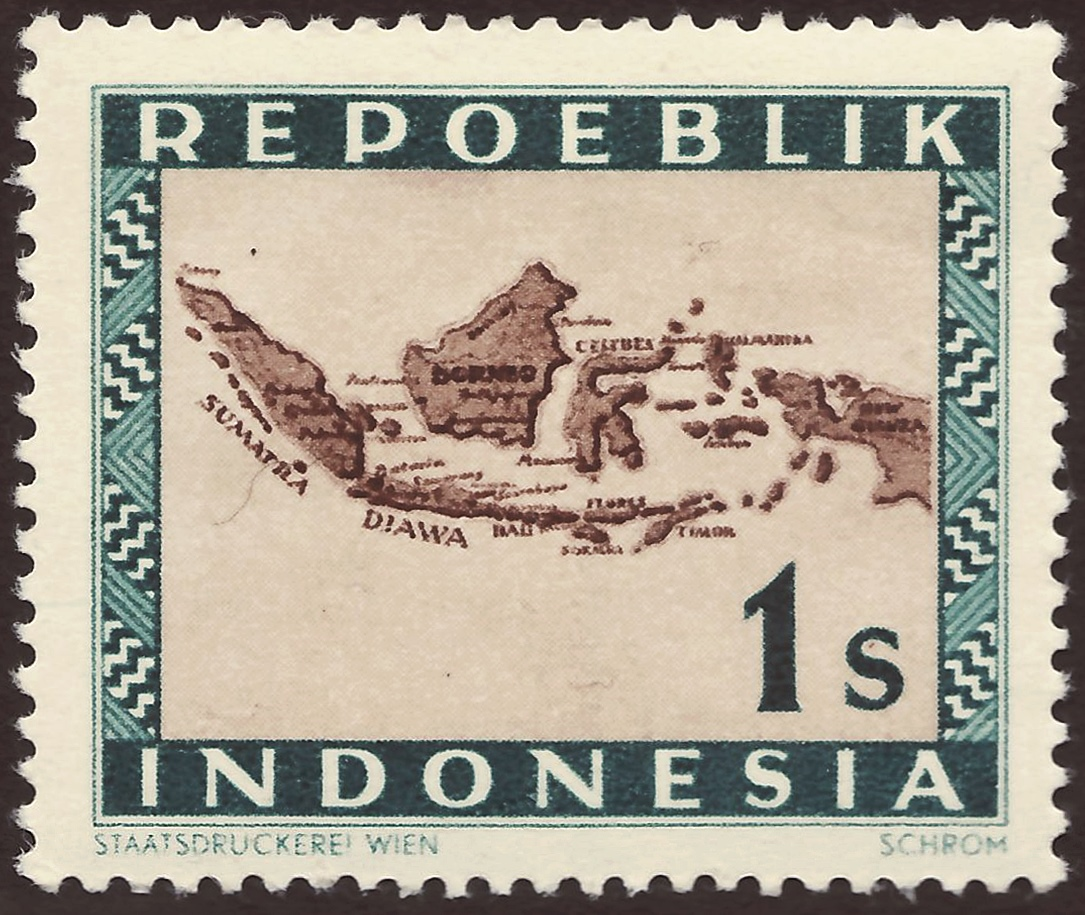
1948 Revolutionary series

Dutch East Indies stamps and stamps from the Japanese occupation were stored in the headquarters of Post Telegraph and Telephone (PTT) and in other post offices. The stamps continued to be used after they were overprinted with words like "Repoeblik Indonesia", "Rep. Indonesia", "Rep. Indonesia PTT", "NRI" and "RI" by Indonesian nationalists.

After the Proclamation of Indonesian Independence, a stamp showing a furious bull was issued to commemorate independence in 1946. It was printed in Yogyakarta using a simple technique in one and two colors. Most stamps were printed and overprinted in Jakarta, Bandung, Yogyakarta, Pematangsiantar, Padang, Palembang, and Aceh.

Indonesian nationalists, at this time, tried to seek international support and recognition. One such effort got underway in 1948 with the printing of stamps of revolutionary series by the Staatsdruckerei, or state printer, in Vienna, Austria and by the American E. W. Wright Banknote Co. of Philadelphia, printed using the photoengraving and steel engraving methods.

=== Independence ===
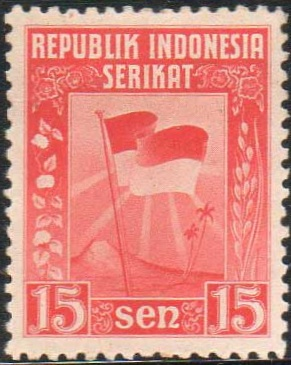
A 1950 stamp marking the inauguration of the United States of Indonesia

Netherlands formally transferred sovereignty of the Dutch East Indies to the United States of Indonesia on 27 December 1949.

In 1954, the first modern printer named Pertjetakan Kebajoran opened in Indonesia, entering a chapter of in-country stamp printing. Local designers appeared, such as Amat bin Dupri, Kurnia & Kok and Junalies. During this period, the government ordered the stamp design and production to Pertjetakan Kebajoran.

=== New order ===
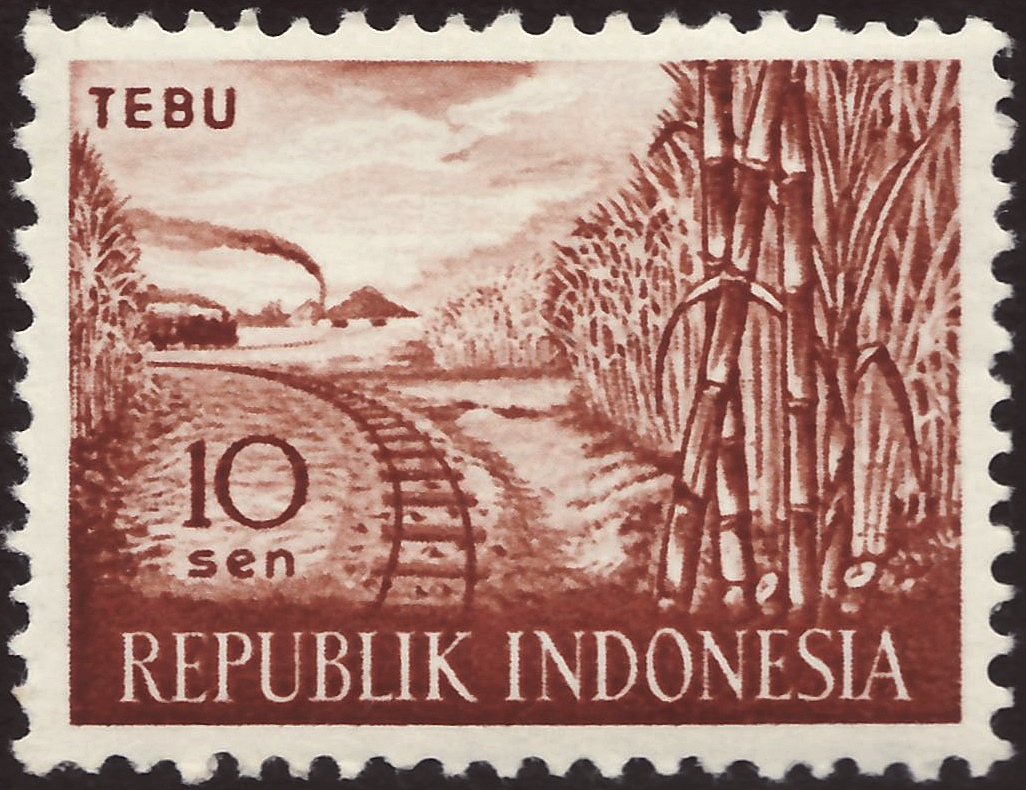
1960 definitive series showing agricultural products

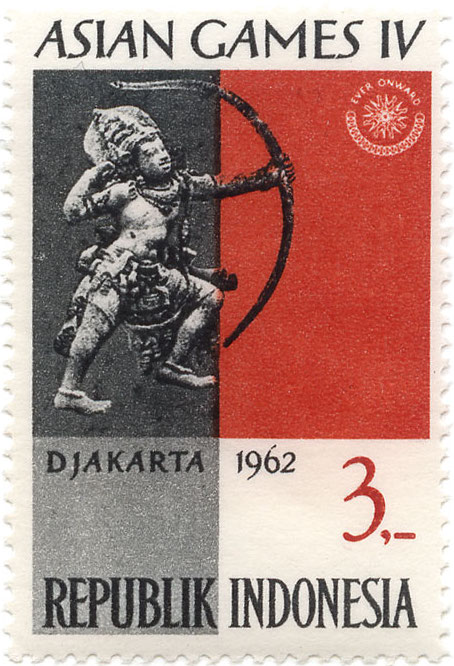
1962 Asian Games issue

Around the time of its first five-year plan, the government issued stamps with many different themes. The general themes drew from national growth and development and related to social activities, art, culture and tourism. These themes can be organized into the following classifications:

- Agriculture
- Industry
- Transportation and communication
- Trade, cooperation and business
- Worker and human rights
- Population and family planning
- Social welfare
- Women, children and public health
- Young generation and sports
- Education and information
- Culture and tourism
- Politics, law, national security, and foreign relations
- Rural development and environment
- Science and technology
- Religion

Since 1971, stamps are printed in Perum Peruri, the national security printer and mint.

== See also ==
- Postage stamps and postal history of the Dutch East Indies
- Postage stamps of Western New Guinea
- Postage stamps and postal history of East Timor
- Postage stamps and postal history of South Moluccas
- Pos Indonesia
