= Surpost =

Suriname's national post office

Suriname Post

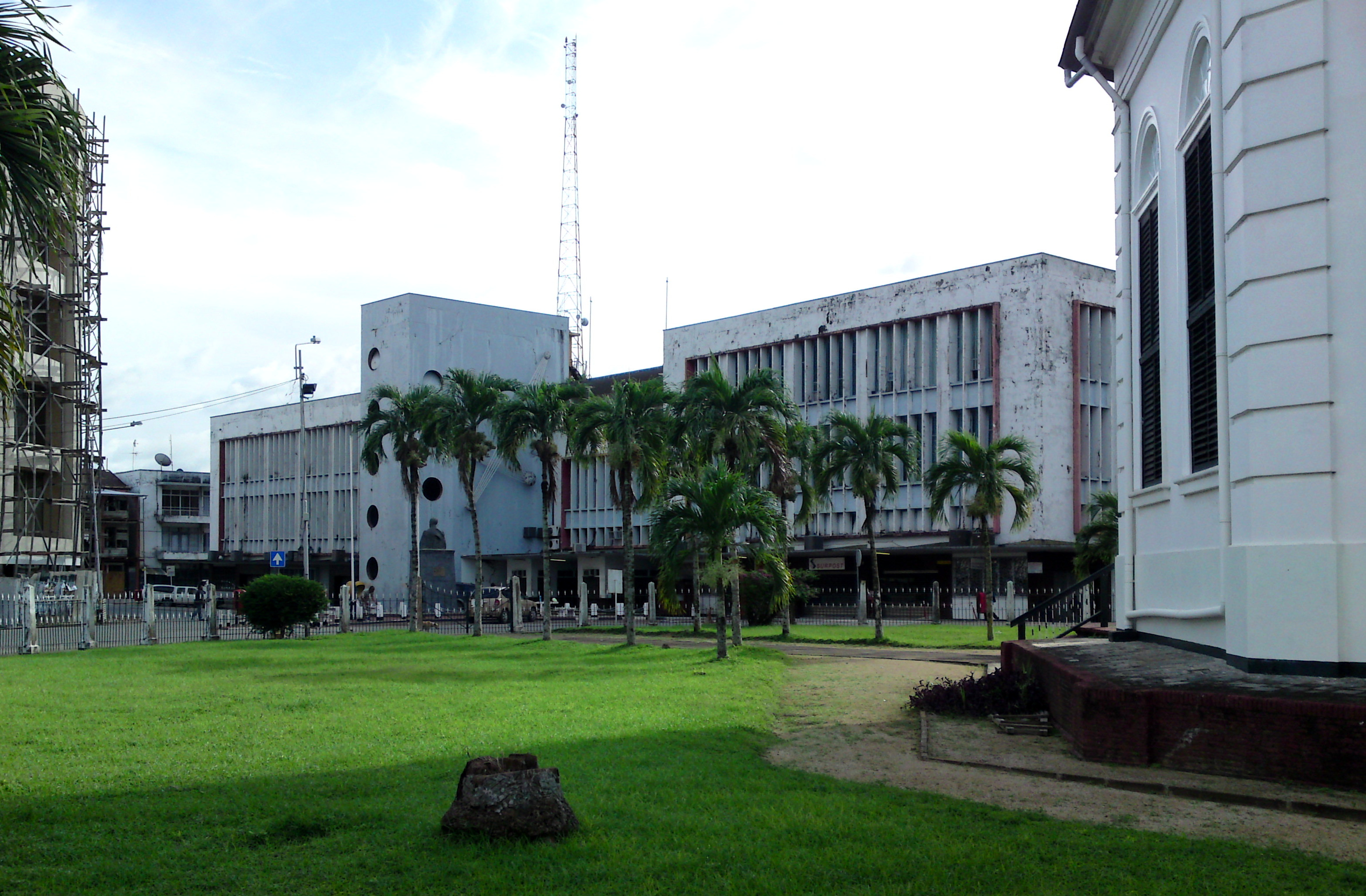
- Central post office in Paramaribo
- Trade name: Surpost
- Type: Postal system
- Area served: Suriname

Surpost, the Suriname Postal Corporation, is the national post office of Suriname.

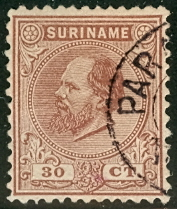
Early 1889 stamp featuring William III

== See also ==
- Caribbean Postal Union
- Postage stamps and postal history of Suriname
