= TTPost =

Trinidad and Tobago Postal Service
- Company type: Government agency
- Industry: Courier
- Founded: 1999
- Headquarters: National Mail Centre, 240-250 Golden Grove Road, Piarco, 350462, Trinidad and Tobago
- Products: First-class and domestic mail, logistics
- Website: TTPost.net

TTPost is the Trinidad and Tobago postal corporation, responsible for the postal services in Trinidad and Tobago.

The company was formed in 1999, with a New Zealand operation taking over the previous government-run service. TTPost provides postal services including registered mail, courier services, package tracking and express mail within the country and internationally. It is also a source of stamps and other postal supplies. The head/general post office is at Piarco Road, now called BWIA Boulevard, replacing the former head office on Wrightson Road, Port of Spain.

== See also ==
- Caribbean Postal Union
