= Postage stamps and postal history of the Dutch East Indies =

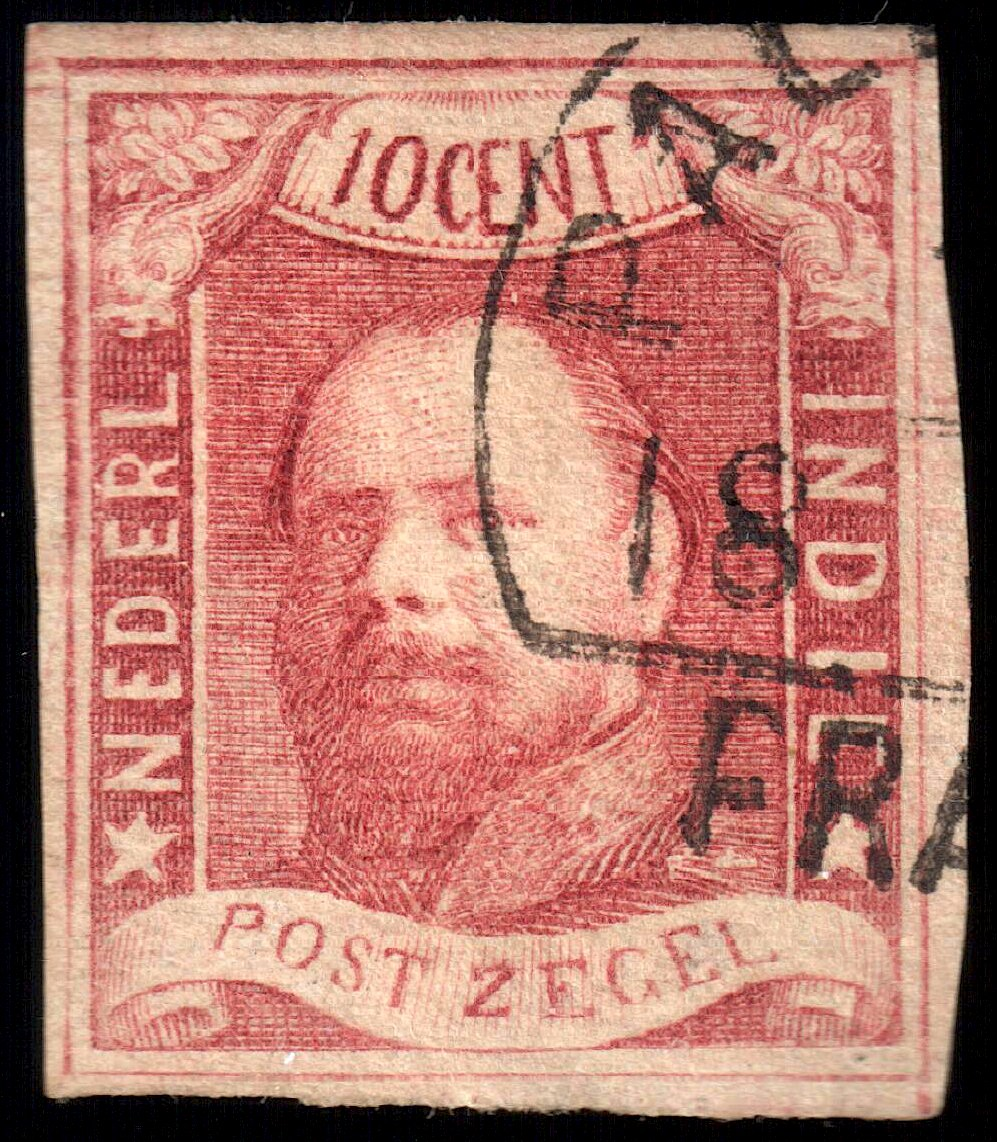
Netherlands East Indies first issue, 1864

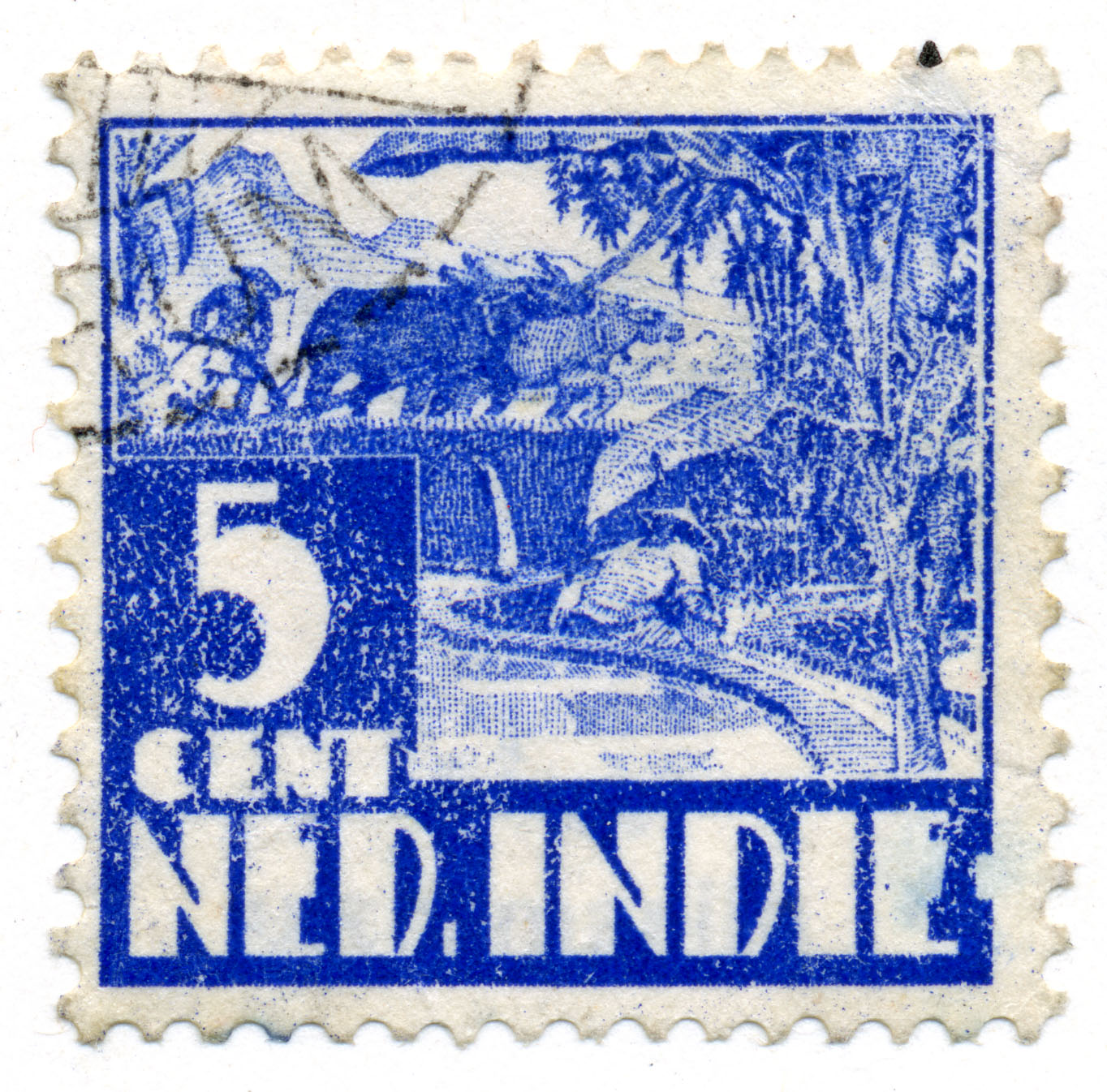
A 1934 stamp of the Netherlands East Indies

This is a survey of the postage stamps and postal history of the Netherlands East Indies, otherwise known as the Dutch East Indies, and which today is known as Indonesia.

== First stamps ==
The first postage stamp in the Dutch East Indies was printed in Utrecht, the Netherlands, on 1 April 1864. The stamp showed a picture of King Willem III of the Netherlands and had a face value of ten cents. It was designed by T W Kaiser. Until 1920, stamp designs showed only pictures of the King and Queen and were primarily shown using typographic design. In 1921, a new series known as the 'Brandkast' series and was specially printed to serve as additional postage for sending sea mail in waterproof iron chests. Stamps issued in later years began to show the culture and geography of the Indonesian archipelago. During the Dutch East Indies period, the stamps were printed in the Netherlands by the firm of Joh. Enschedé & Zoner of Haarlem, and some printing was done in Batavia (Jakarta) by Reproductiebedrijf Topografische Dienst. The stamps were mostly printed in one or two colors.

== Netherlands New Guinea ==
From 1950 to 1962, stamps were issued as the renamed Nederlands Nieuw Guinea. Netherlands New Guinea came under temporary United Nations administration from 1 October 1962 to 1 May 1963 when stamps were overprinted "UNTEA".

On 1 May 1963, the area became the Indonesian province of West Irian (Irian Barat) and issued its own stamps until 1973 since when Indonesian stamps have been used.

== See also ==
- Postage stamps and postal history of Indonesia
- Postage stamps and postal history of Malaysia
- Postage stamps and postal history of the Netherlands
- Postage stamps and postal history of Western New Guinea
