= Postage stamps and postal history of Suriname =

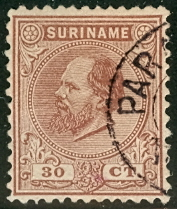
An early stamp of Suriname

Suriname, a former Dutch colony on the north-east coast of South America, has issued stamps since 1873. The earlier issues until it gained state autonomy in December 1954, mostly featured the head of the Dutch monarch on them. Suriname gained full independence in November 1975.

== See also ==
- Surpost The post office of Suriname.
