= Postage stamps and postal history of South Moluccas =

Stamps issued by the exile government in the Netherlands

This article surveys the postage stamps and postal history of the Republic of South Moluccas. Historical or political incidents can be found in the main article.

== Stamp issues ==
Although the Republic of South Moluccas did not issue its own postage stamps, several stamps bearing the country's name can be found. They are so-called bogus stamps, which are private stamp issues and were not issued by any postal administration of the South Moluccas.

There are three distinct bogus stamp issues of the Republic of South Moluccas:

- Overprints
- Stamp issues of the exile government in the Netherlands
- Stamps from the Österreichische Staatsdruckerei (Austrian National Print Office), which were ordered and sold by New York stamp dealer Henry Stolow.

=== Overprints ===
In 1950, 17 stamps of the Dutch East Indies and Indonesia were overprinted with "Republik Maluku Selatan". Many philatelists believe that the stamps could have been used locally. However, the majority assumes that they are stamp forgeries.

=== Stamp issues of the exile government in the Netherlands ===
Several one- and three-coloured stamp issues of South Moluccas lacking the date of issue are known. They were possibly sold by the exiled government in the Netherlands. These issues were supposed to announce the archipelago and flag of the Republic of South Moluccas, point out the concern of this exile government, and win target audiences, such as the Universal Postal Union (UPU), the United Nations (UN), and General Douglas MacArthur for their goals. But there are also stamps where no unambiguous reason can be given for their issuance.

=== Stamps ordered and sold by Henry Stolow ===
In 1955, approximately 150 coloured triangular or rectangular stamp forgeries by New York and Munich stamp dealer Henry Stolow (1901–1971) appeared on the market without a date of issue. These stamp issues were printed in the Österreichische Staatsdruckerei without verification of their legality. These issues do not bear any hint of their date of issue, as German stamps do, for example. Therefore, it is completely futile to assign them to specific years of issue, as is sometimes done. They were never used for postage, so there are only mint copies.

In 1991, Peter Doerling wrote:

Thus in 1954, some gentlemen appeared at the Vienna Staatsdruckerei, among them a German stamp dealer, who wanted to have stamps printed for the new REPUBLIC MALUKU SELATAN. In fact, this republic was proclaimed on the Indonesian Moluccas islands of Ambon and Ceram, whose Christian inhabitants no longer wanted to be part of the Islamic republic of Indonesia. The republic was in existence for only a short time; warships fired on Ambonia and many inhabitants fled to the Netherlands. Of course, this was only a pretense for the speculators, because they ordered about 150 stamp issues, among them a lot of beautiful animal and plant themes as well as a UN series, all of them merely fantasy issues without any philatelic value.

== Valuation of these stamp issues ==
Respected stamp catalogs and stamp dealers do not sell stamps from the Republic Maluku Selatan. No valid stamps from that region are known to the Michel editorial department.

Regarding the coloured stamp issues sold since 1955, the Michel editorial department stated:

They are merely bogus stamps, which cannot be found in any respectable catalogue, and should not be offered by any dealer who wants to be regarded as reputable – unless under the explicit description of "bogus stamp".

Ulrich Häger wrote in the "Großes Lexikon der Philatelie" (Great Encyclopaedia of Philately) under the keyword Maluku Selatan:

In 1955, approx. 150 commemorative stamps with the country name MALUKU SELATAN gradually appeared, which were supposed to have come from a new independent state formed on the Moluccas. In fact, there were efforts on the Moluccas to become independent from Indonesia, but the formation of the country never took place. But that was no obstacle for a well-known New York stamp dealer; via a middleman, he placed an order for the production of series of stamps at the Staatsdruckerei, which was promptly carried out, without making sure that Maluku Selatan really existed. These stamps, which were initially bought by many collectors due to lack of knowledge, at best have only a low value as curiosities.

The Scott Standard Postage Stamp Catalogue wrote under the keyword South Moluccas:

It appears that the stamps of the so-called republic of South Moluccas were privately issued and had no postal use. Accordingly, they are not recognized as postage stamps.

== Literature ==
in German

- Ulrich Häger: Großes Lexikon der Philatelie, Bertelsmann Lexikon-Verlag, Gütersloh-Berlin-Munich-Vienna 1973 (p. 275 Maluku Selatan, p. 449 Henry Stolow).
- Michel Rundschau 5/1988 (p. 362 Maluku Selatan), 7/1988 (p. 534–536 Maluku Selatan).
