= Postage stamps and postal history of Western New Guinea =

This article surveys the postage stamps and postal history of Western New Guinea, particularly in 1949–1963.

== Netherlands New Guinea ==
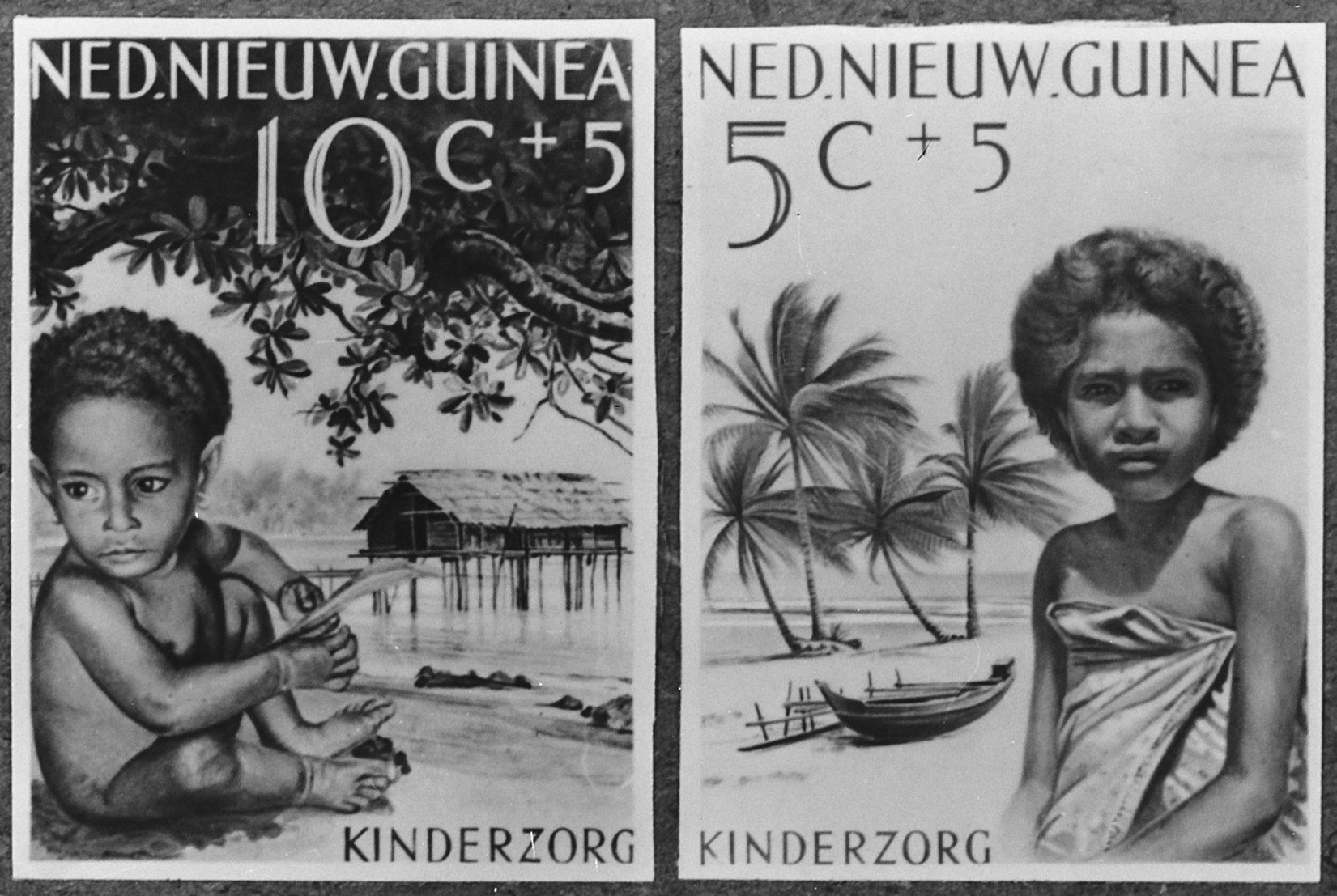
Stamps of Netherlands New Guinea

From 1950 to 1962, stamps were issued as the Nederlands Nieuw Guinea.

Netherlands New Guinea came under temporary United Nations administration from 1 October 1962 to 1 May 1963 when stamps were overprinted “UNTEA”. The first were overprints reading "UNTEA" (United Nations Temporary Executive Authority) applied to the stamps of Dutch New Guinea, issued in 1962. There are four slightly different types of overprint, three types applied locally, and a fourth made in the Netherlands and sold by the UN in New York City.

Two people have appeared on the postage stamps of Netherlands New Guinea:

- Juliana of the Netherlands, queen of the Netherlands (1950)
- Prince Bernhard of the Netherlands, prince consort (1962)

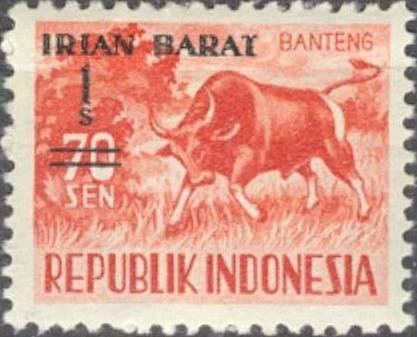
Indonesian stamp overprinted for Western New Guinea in 1963

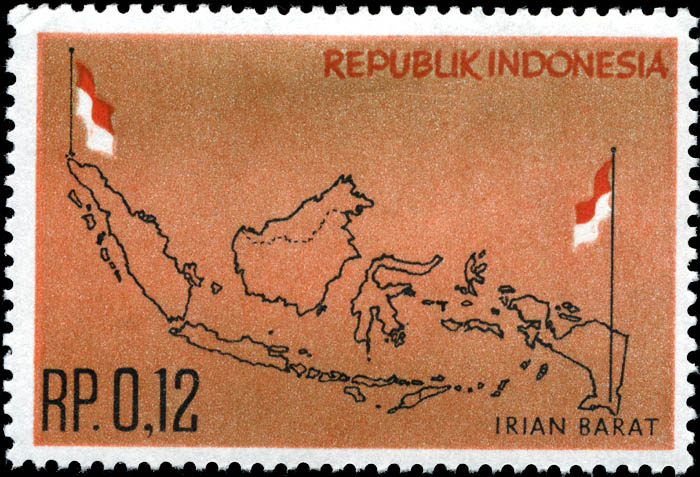
Indonesian stamp issued for Western New Guinea in 1963

Since 1963 Western New Guinea has been part of Indonesia. The Indonesian postal service is responsible for mail in the region. Netherlands New Guinea stamps were superseded on 1 May 1963 by stamps of Indonesia overprinted "IRIAN BARAT" and a series of six commemoratives whose designs included a map of Indonesia stretching "from Sabang to Merauke" and a parachutist landing in New Guinea. These, as were later issues in 1968 and 1970, were inscribed both "IRIAN BARAT" and "REPUBLIK INDONESIA".

== See also ==
- Postage stamps and postal history of Indonesia
- Postage stamps and postal history of Malaysia
