= Post Aruba =

Postal service

The logo of Post Aruba

Post Aruba N.V. is the post office of Aruba, part of the Kingdom of the Netherlands. Post Aruba was privatised on 1 September 2005, having previously been in public ownership.

== History ==
The first mail delivered to Aruba came on boats originating from Venezuela or Curaçao. Mail arrived at the island's main port in Oranjestad from where it was collected by the inhabitants.

In 1892 the Governor of Aruba was given the title of Director of Post and tasked with the responsibility of delivering the mail. The first official post office was in Plaza Daniel Leo but moved to J.E. Irausquin plein # 9 in 1958. The building was designed by the Manager of the Department of Public Services, A.A. van Ammers.

== Stamp issues ==
Post Aruba is responsible for the Aruba stamp issuing programme and Aruba has had its own stamps since obtaining internal autonomy in 1986. Commemorative and definitive stamps are issued as well as a range of revenue stamps for use on official documents.

== Postal services ==
A range of services are offered including letter post, parcels, express, airmail and post office boxes.

== Post offices in Aruba ==
- Oranjestad
- San Nicolas
- Sta. Cruz

== See also ==
- Postage stamps and postal history of Aruba
