= Postage stamps and postal history of Aruba =

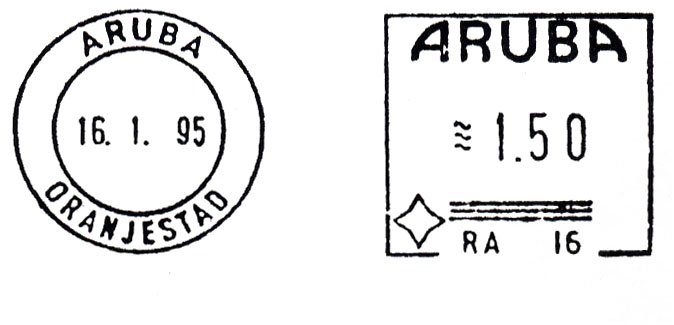
A meter stamp from Aruba

Aruba has produced its own stamps since 1 January 1986, when it was granted internal autonomy within the Kingdom of the Netherlands. It had previously been part of the Netherlands Antilles. The official language is Dutch.

== Early days ==
The first mail delivered to Aruba came on boats originating from Venezuela or Curaçao. Mail arrived at the island's main port in Oranjestad from where it was collected by the inhabitants.

In 1892 the Governor of Aruba was given the title of Director of Post and tasked with the responsibility of delivering the mail. The first official post office was in Plaza Daniel Leo but moved to J.E. Irausquin plein # 9 in 1958.

== First stamps ==
The first issue was to celebrate the New Constitution and included a 25 cent stamp displaying Aruba's position on a map of the Caribbean.

The stamp printing for Aruba is done primarily by Enschedé of the Netherlands.

== See also ==
- The International Postage Meter Stamp catalog - Aruba.
- Post Aruba the Aruba Post Office.
