= Postage stamps and postal history of Curaçao =

The first stamp issued after the dissolution of the Netherlands Antilles

Curaçao, a country within the Kingdom of the Netherlands started issuing postal stamps after the dissolution of the Netherlands Antilles on 10 October 2010. The island forms one of the five postage regions in the Kingdom. The first stamp issued shows the map of the island. The value of the current stamp is denominated in Netherlands Antillean guilders.

On 13 August 2013 Curaçao had a joint issue with Malta with the theme "Harbours". Curaçao's miniature sheet depicted Willemstad Harbour while Malta's miniature sheet depicted the Grand Harbour.

== See also ==
- Postage stamps and postal history of the Netherlands Antilles
