= Postage stamps and postal history of Sint Maarten =

The first stamp issued after the dissolution of the Netherlands Antilles

Sint Maarten, a country within the Kingdom of the Netherlands, started issuing postal stamps after the dissolution of the Netherlands Antilles on 10 October 2010. The island thus became one of the five postage regions in the Kingdom of the Netherlands. The first stamp issued showed the map of the island Saint Martin.

Since the first issue, Sint Maarten stamps have been denominated in Netherlands Antillean guilders.

== Postal history ==
Before 1997 postal services were a governmental monopoly. That year postal services were privatized by the creation of the Post Nederlandse Antillen NV (PNA). Although at the beginning all the shares were held by the government, in 2003 the PNA was replaced by the independent Nieuwe Post Nederlandse Antillen NV (NPNA), a fully owned subsidiary of Canada Post International Limited (CPIL). Upon postal independence in 2010, the NPNA continued postal services; however, due to declining revenues the NPNA ceased postal services on 3 October 2011. This was part of CPOST's shifting from postal services to more lucrative fields, although the NPNA continued postal services on other Dutch Antilles islands. Postal services on St. Maarten resumed on 1 January 2012 under the newly created Postal Services St. Maarten NV (PSS). Problems with customer service led to a reorganization within PSS in 2017.

In 2017 postal services were suspended for over a month after Hurricane Irma hit the island on 6 September. In addition to damage to postal facilities, looters stole parcels and gasoline from postal trucks. Delivery was hampered by the number of addresses that were no longer habitable, with occupants displaced.

The main post office on the island is located in Philipsburg on Soualiga Road.

== See also ==
- Postage stamps and postal history of the Netherlands Antilles
