= Seychelles Postal Service =

- Industry: Postal services, courier
- Headquarters: PO Box 60, Victoria, Seychelles
- Key people: Mariella Buisson, CEO
- Services: Letter post, parcel service, EMS, delivery, Financial services
- Website: seychelles-post.com

The Seychelles Postal Service, is the public operator responsible for postal service in Seychelles.

The Seychelles Postal Service is a member of the Universal Postal Union as accepted into the organisation on 7 October 1977 using the ISO Code: ISO 3166-2:SC. It is a signatory to the 2016 Postal Payment Services Agreement.

== History ==
Seychelles first post office was opened in 1861 though letters may have been carried privately since 1824. A central post office, as a sub-office of Mauritius, was opened in Victoria in 1861 but used Mauritius stamps, until 5 July 1880, when only Seychelles stamps were valid though Mauritius stamps could be exchanged for the new local stamps that were issued on 5 April 1890. Except for improvements and repairs the Victoria post office has remained in the same location since opening.

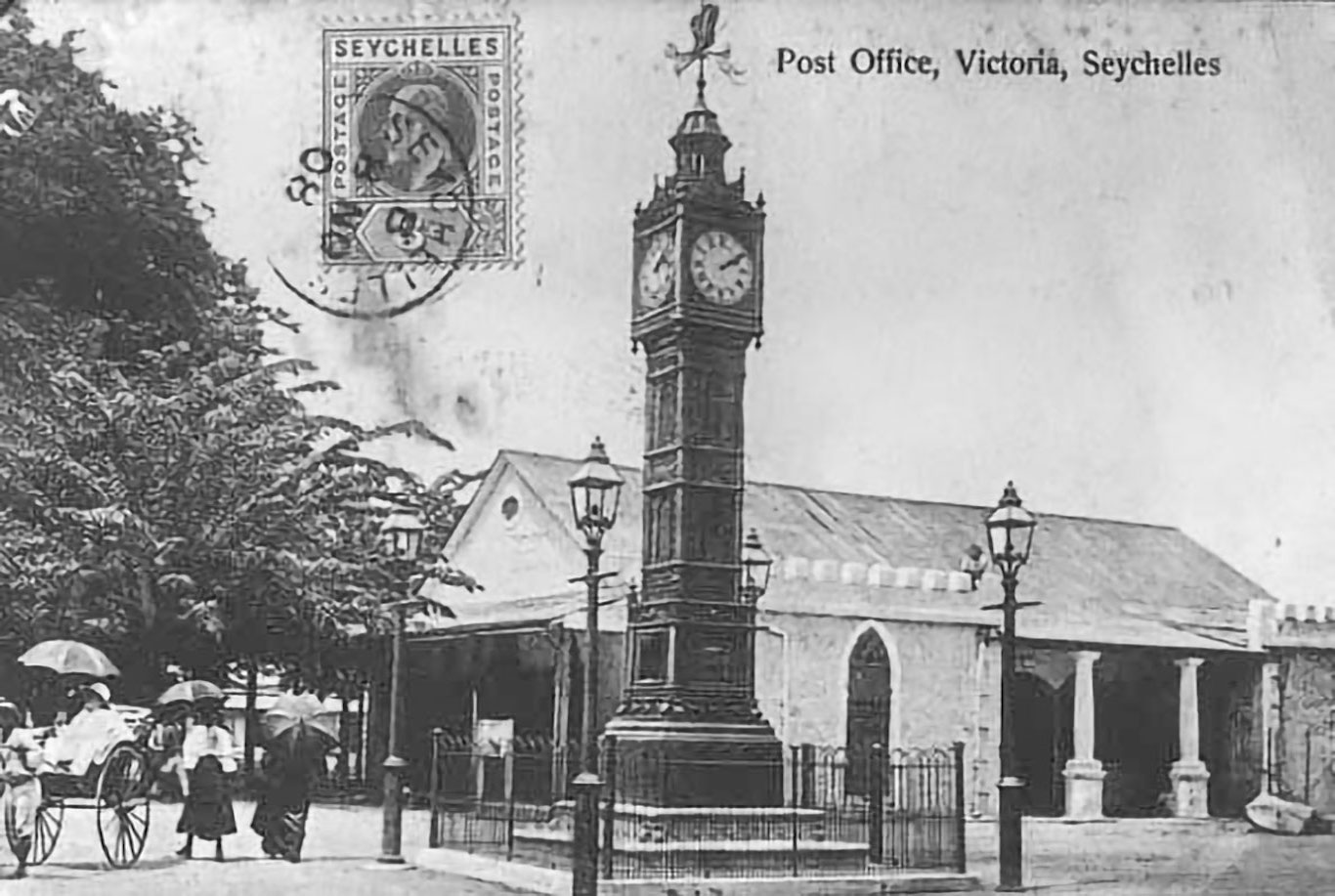
Victoria Post Office and clock tower c 1900

A regular maritime mail contract was initiated in 1866 and by 1877, 14,184 letters were reported between the Seychelles and the Mauritius Post Office. A local post was first initiated in 1893 and police non-commissioned officers acted as receiving and dispatching officers but this terminated in July of the following year. 1894 and 1895 saw great strides forward with the introduction of an inland postal service and the British India Steam Navigation Company starting a shipping contract in August 1895.

Bickham Sweet-Escott became administrator of the Seychelles in June 1899 and Governor of the Seychelles between 1903–4. During his tenure he introduced changes that improved the inland post service using the paquebot service.

== 20th century ==
By 1920 the postal service had expanded to include all the outlying islands within the Seychelles. Airmail service that had started in 1932 became official in 1938 when the mail was transported on at least one leg of its journey by aircraft providing a faster service than ships alone. That service was connected through Karachi and Nairobi. Mahé, Praslin, La Digue and the outer islands were included in the local postal service that by 1965 also included the British Indian Ocean Territory.

== 21st century ==
On Mahé, besides the Victoria post office, in the south-east of the main island is an office at Anse Royale, that moved in 2020 from its original location because it was too cramped for the quantity of small packets arriving and on 1 June 2022 was moved back to its former location. In the same year the post office at La Digue was closed because the building was to be demolished despite the Postal Sector Act of 2010 including provisions for the Seychelles Postal Services' to own their properties.

Mariella Buisson was appointed CEO of the postal service by the county's president Wavel Ramkalawan on 3 December 2021. In February 2022 she announced the Baie Ste Anne post office on Praslin would close permanently on 15 March 2022 saying it costs R1.3 million to run but only brings in R292,000. Staff were transferred to the Grand Anse branch on the island. The Seychelles Postal Services employs some 100 people between its post offices that includes a parcel section in Victoria.

== Services ==
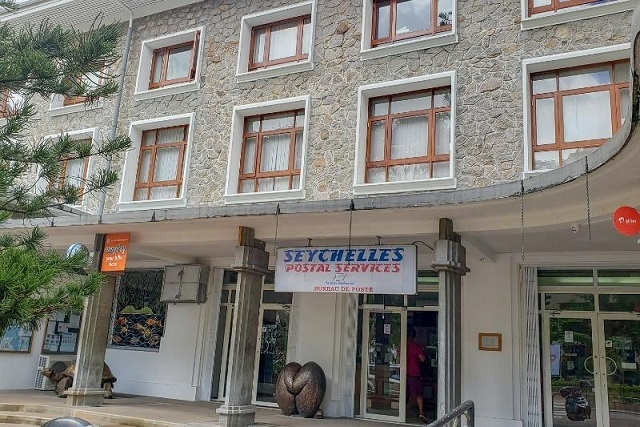
Central post office in the capital Victoria

Services include:

- Mail collection and delivery
- Express Mail Service
- Financial services
- Parcel post
- Philatelic bureau
- Souvenir gift shop

== Stamps ==
The Seychelles was a separate British crown colony in 1903 having been a dependency of Mauritius for almost 100 years.

Since the nation became independent in 1976 the postal service continues to offer stamps honouring the islands by issuing stamps with a more local flavour, such as those commemorating significant events from the around the globe, like the Olympic Games the nation participates in and today feature local flora and fauna, and issues depicting historical Seychellois figures. They have also issued stamps of the British royals who previously served as the head of state for the islands.

== See also ==
- Communications in Seychelles
- List of EMS Cooperative members
- Postage stamps and postal history of Seychelles
- Revenue stamps of Seychelles
