= Postage stamps and postal history of Mauritius =

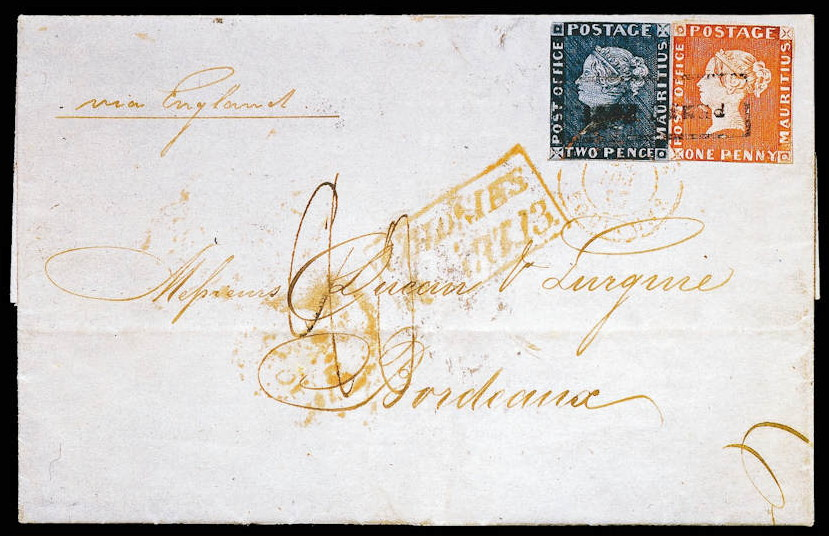
"Bordeaux Cover" with Mauritius 1d Red and 2d Deep Blue "Post Office" auctioned for CHF5,750,000 in 1993

Mauritius, a small island in the southwest Indian Ocean, is important to the world of philately for a number of reasons. Its first two postage stamps issued in 1847, called the "Post Office" stamps, are of legendary rarity and value. They were the first stamps issued in any part of the British Empire outside of Great Britain. The unique cover bearing both "Post Office" stamps has been called "la pièce de résistance de toute la philatélie" or "the greatest item in all philately". The cover was sold at auction, in Zurich, on 3 November 1993, for 5.75 million Swiss francs (inclusive of 15% buyers premium), the equivalent of about $4 million – the highest price ever paid for a single philatelic item up to that time. In addition, Mauritius is well known for the subsequent locally produced issues known as "primitives," also prized by collectors.

== Pre-adhesive stamps ==
Mauritius’s first overseas mail service functioned when the island was under French rule. Mail was delivered internally and by ship to and from France and India. No stamps were ever issued by the French in Mauritius and no commercial postal activity took place in Mauritius. Great Britain took over the island by force of arms on December 3, 1810, and continued with the British version of the same overseas mail service. The internal service dwindled and terminated but was revived in 1834. A few pre-stamp markings, applied by rubber stamp, existed during the French administration, and more are known from the subsequent British period.

== The Victorian period ==
In 1847, Mauritius followed Great Britain in issuing stamps carrying the image of the current regent of Great Britain, Victoria, which practice would be followed throughout the British Empire. Most of the early issues of Mauritius were locally designed and produced and have a distinct "primitive" character.

=== The "Post Office" stamps ===
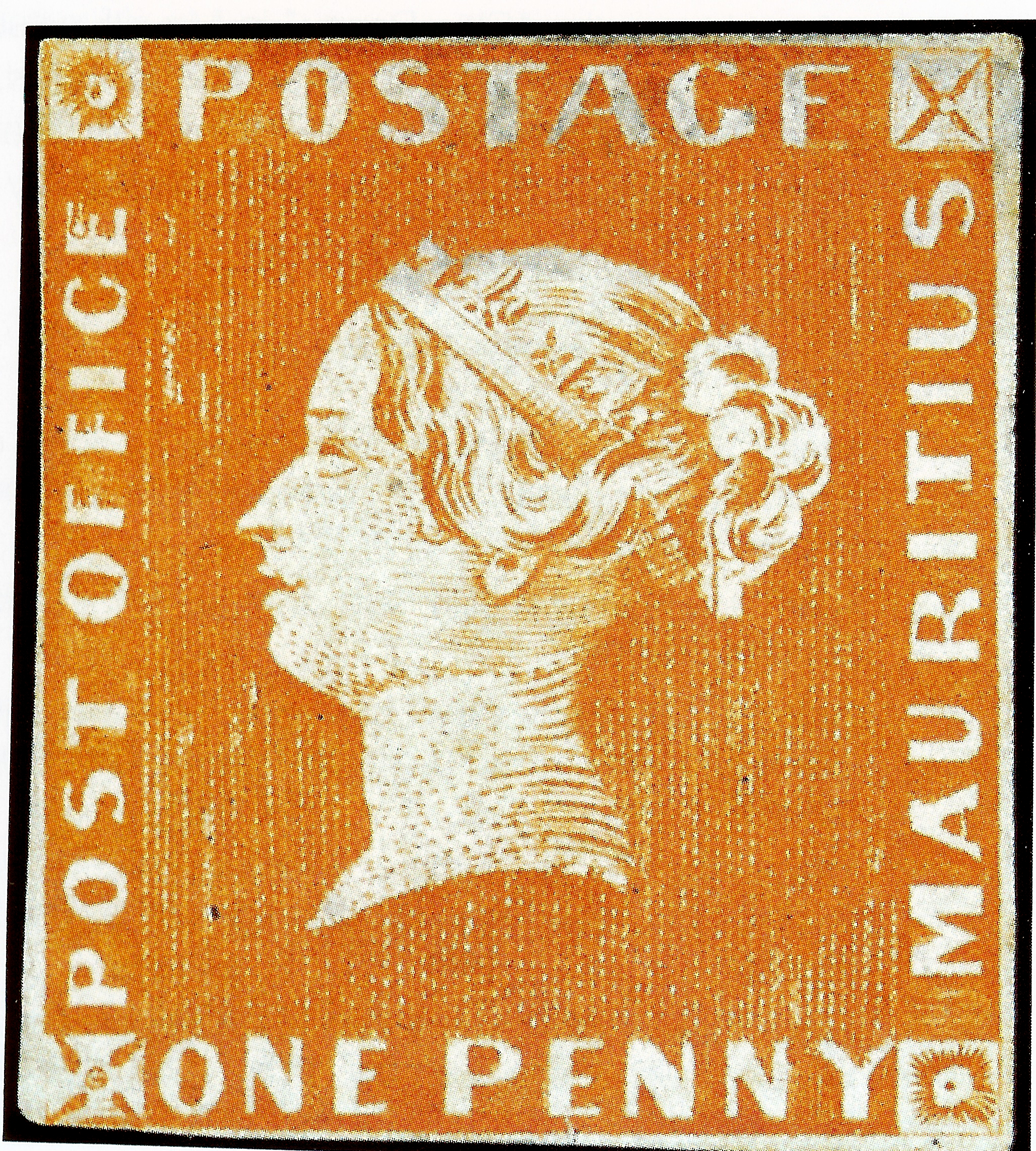
"Post Office" 1847

On September 21, 1847, Mauritius issued two stamps, an orange-red one penny (1d) and a deep blue two pence (2d). The words "Post Office" appear in the left panel, but were changed to "Post Paid" in the following issue, and are the source of the stamps' common name. The "Post Office" stamps are among the rarest stamps in the world, and are of legendary status in the world of philately.

Five hundred of each were printed from a single plate bearing both values, many of which were used on invitations sent out by the Mauritian Governor's wife for a ball which she was holding that weekend.

The stamps were engraved by Joseph Osmond Barnard, born in England on August 10, 1816, who stowed away on a ship to Mauritius in 1838. The designs were based on the then current issue of Great Britain stamps (first released in 1841), bearing the profile head of Queen Victoria and issued in two denominations in similar colors: one penny red brown and Two Pence Blue. Although these locally produced stamps have a distinct primitive character, they made Barnard’s "name immortal in the postal history of Mauritius".

The words "Post Office" in the left panel were replaced in the following issue by "Post Paid." A legend arose later that the words "Post Office" had been an error. The "Post Office" stamps and this legend are discussed in greater detail in the Mauritius "Post Office" article.

=== The "Post Paid" stamps and subsequent "primitives" ===
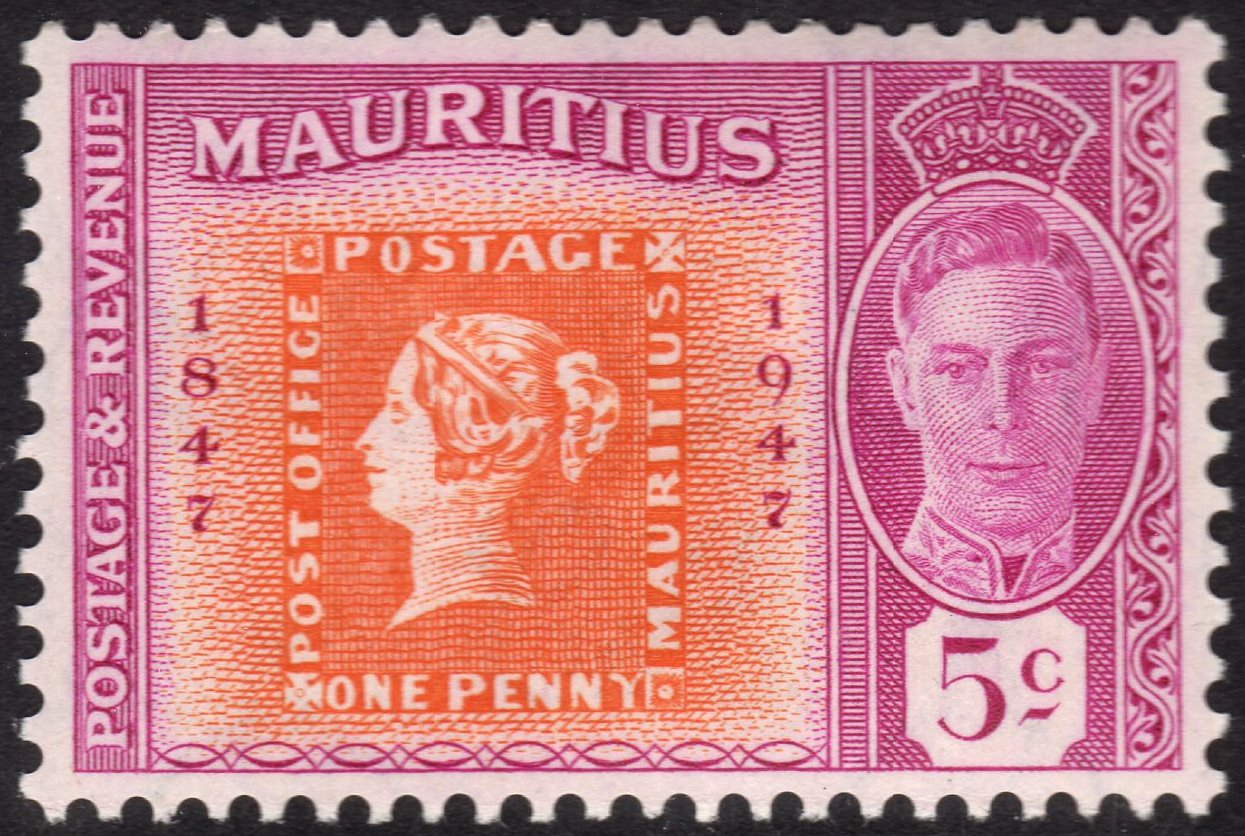
One of four stamps issued in 1947 to mark the centenary of the first stamps of Mauritius

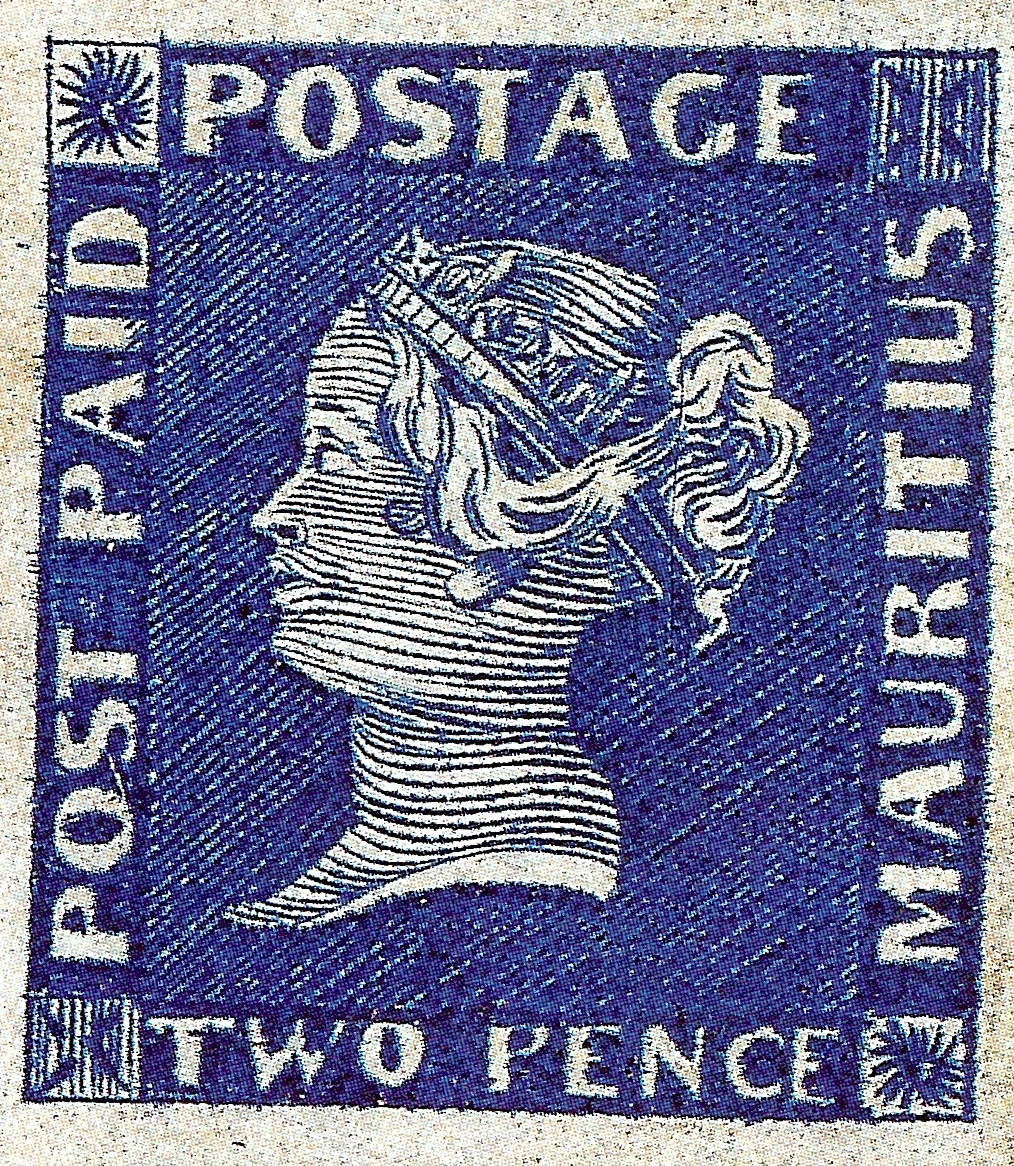
"Post Paid" 1848

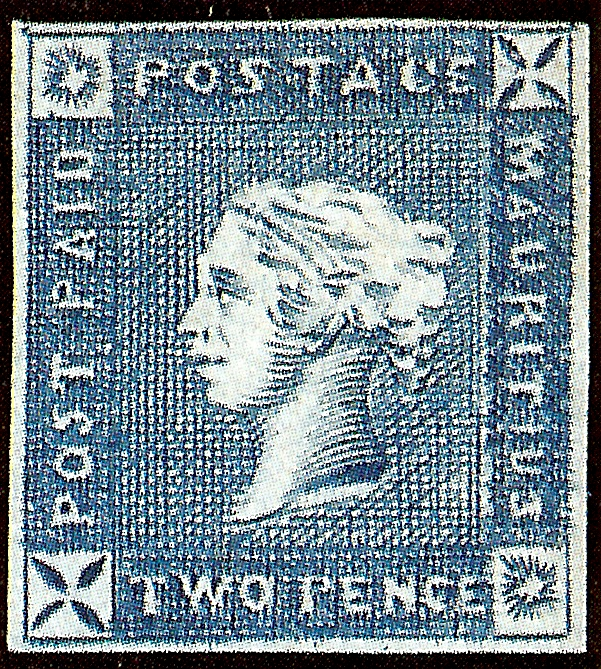
Lapirot issue 1859

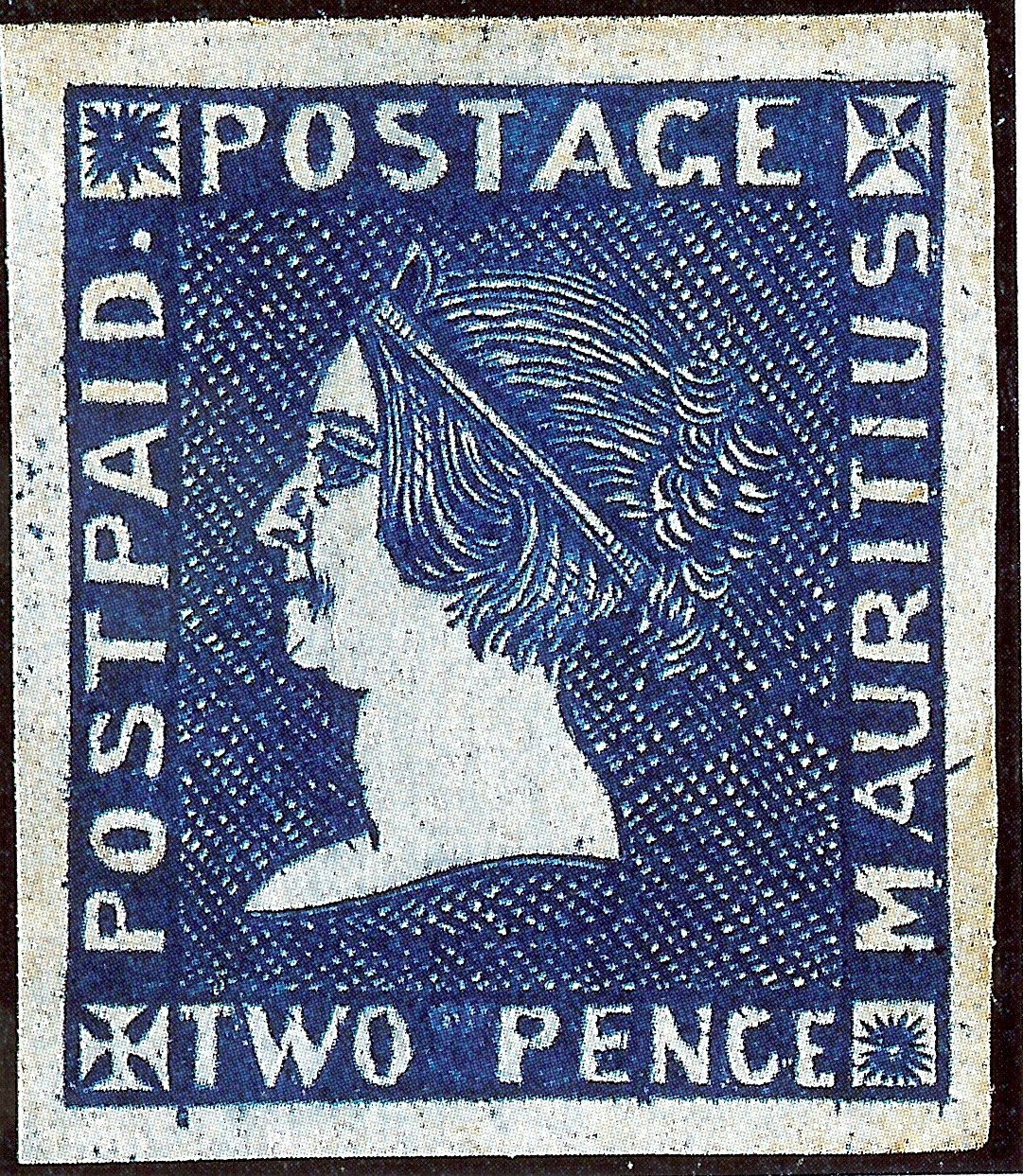
Sherwin issue 1859

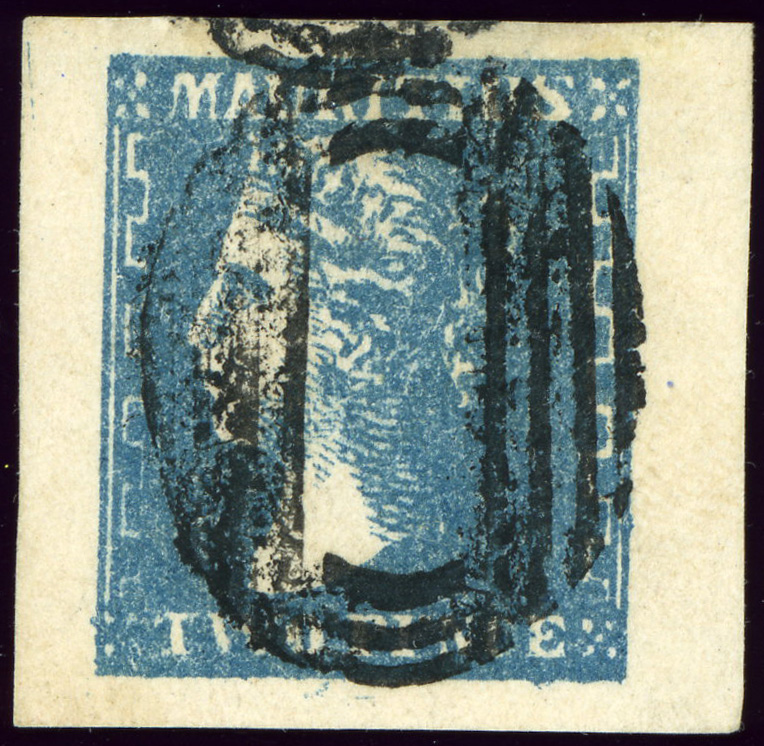
Dardenne litho 1859

Following the "Post Office" stamps, Mauritius released several stamps also bearing Queen Victoria's profile, locally designed, and primitive in appearance.

In 1848, Mauritius issued the first denomination (two pence) of the "Post Paid" issue, one and two pence stamps closely similar to the "Post Office" issue also engraved by Barnard. The one penny orange was issued in 1854.

In 1859, Mauritius released a third design, a two pence stamp very crudely engraved by Jules Lapirot, and known as the "Lapirot" issue. The stamp was described as "the greatest libel upon Her late Majesty Queen Victoria that has been ever been perpetrated" and it was nicknamed in France as the tête de singe (monkey head) issue.

In 1859, the original "Post Paid" one penny and two pence printing plates were re-engraved by Robert Sherwin, but only the two pence stamps were issued. The final local product was a one penny red and two pence blue lithographed by L. A. Dardenne in 1859.

The "Post Paid" through the Sherwin issues were printed in sheets of 12 and stamp collectors have "plated" or reconstructed full sheets from individual or pairs of stamps, relying on small variations in the individual plates. The sheet size of the Dardenne issue is unknown.

=== To the end of the Victorian period ===
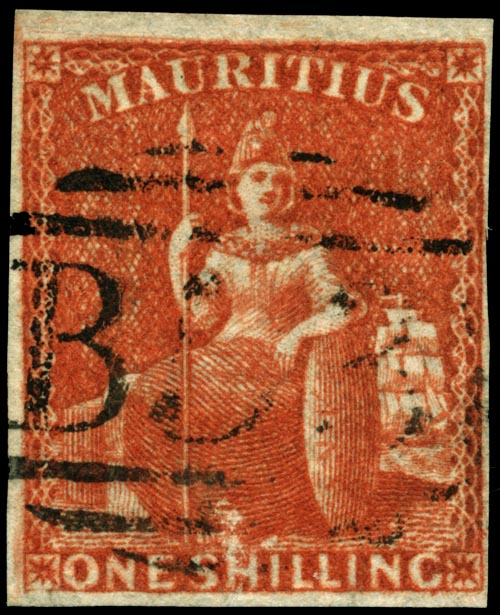
Britannia 1859

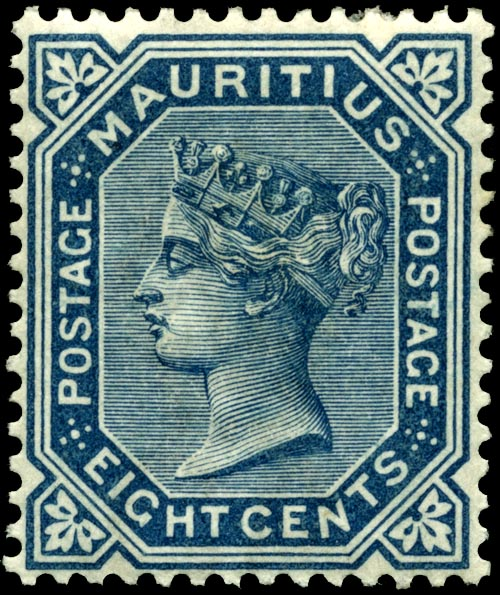
Victoria 1891

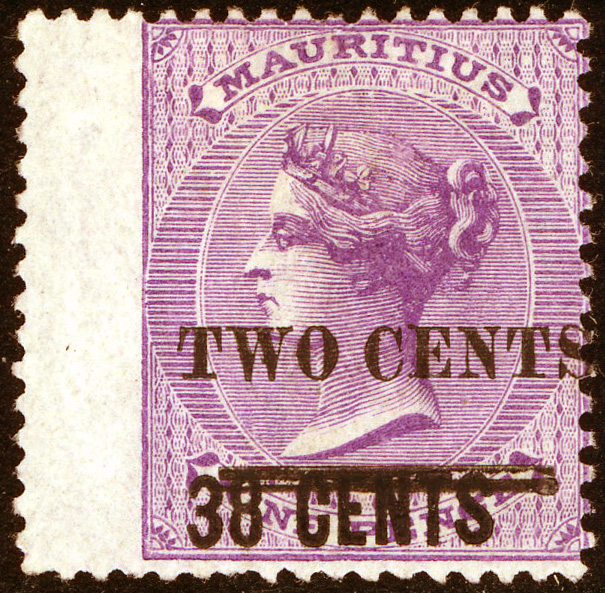
2 cents over 38 cents on 9d in 1891

From 1859 to 1862, Mauritius issued several stamps in the key type "Britannia" design engraved by Perkins, Bacon & Co. and printed in London, and previously used in Trinidad (1851) and Barbados (1852). These stamps were issued during the period when Mauritius was also issuing locally produced stamps. From 1859 to 1902, Mauritius issued stamps typical of those of colonies of the British Empire, including a number of stamps depicting Queen Victoria in profile and stamps with Mauritius' coat of arms.

== The Twentieth Century ==
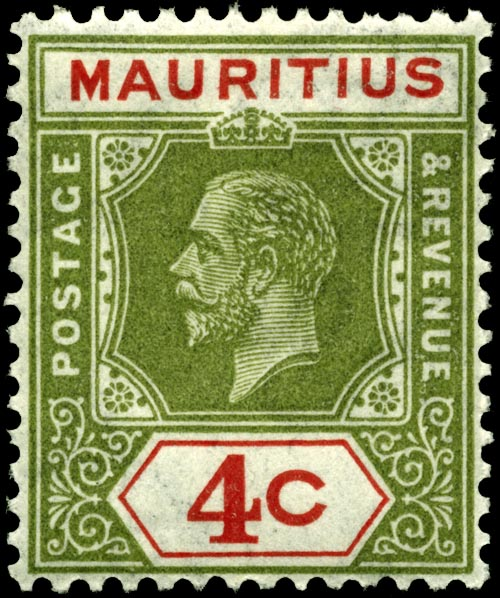
1932 stamp of George V

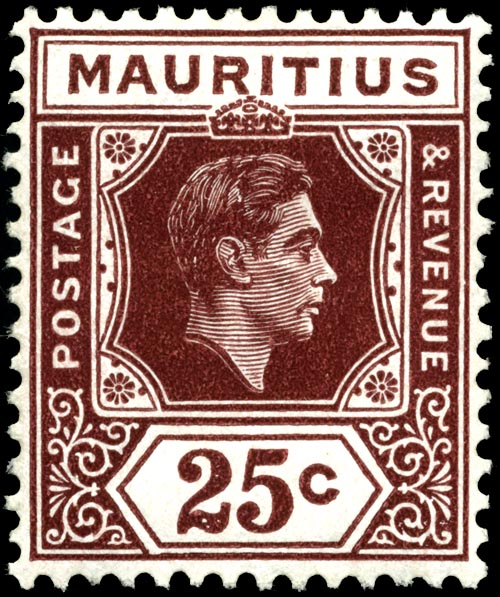
1938 George VI stamp

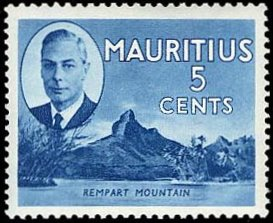
1950 stamp showing Rempart Mountain and George VI

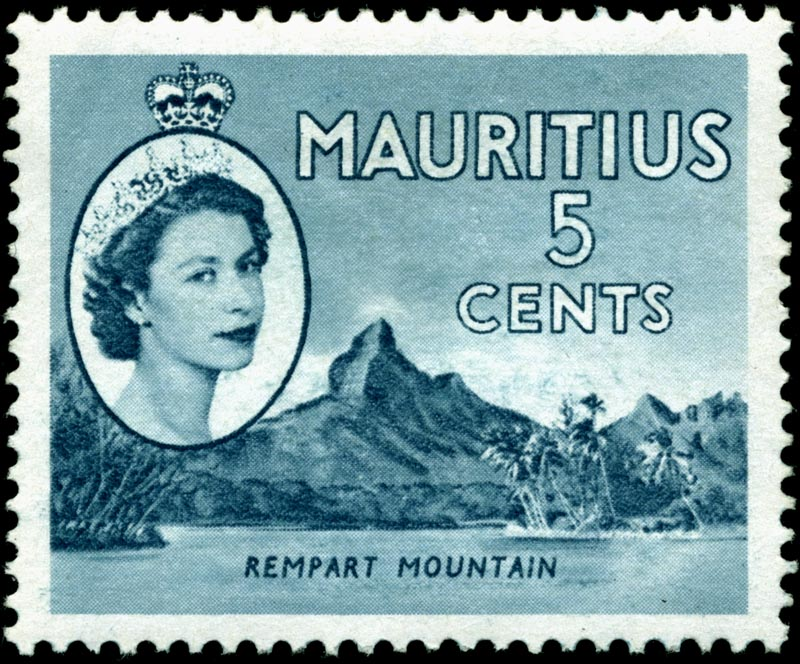
The same stamp, reissued 1954, for Queen Elizabeth II

The twentieth century issues of Mauritius, like those in other British colonies, generally depicted the current monarch, Edward VII, George V and George VI, and Elizabeth II, as well as Mauritius' coat of arms. In 1950, Mauritius began issuing more colorful stamps with images or scenes of local interest. The definitive series of 1950 was issued during the reign of King George VI but a new series was required in 1954 following the accession of Queen Elizabeth II to the British throne. The same designs were used for both series.

=== Independence (March 12, 1968) ===
Mauritius achieved independence on March 12, 1968. Its stamps thereafter depicted colorful images relevant to the island, such as wildlife and plants, local scenes and important persons. The early stamps of Mauritius have been reproduced several times on commemorative issues.

== Postal stationery ==
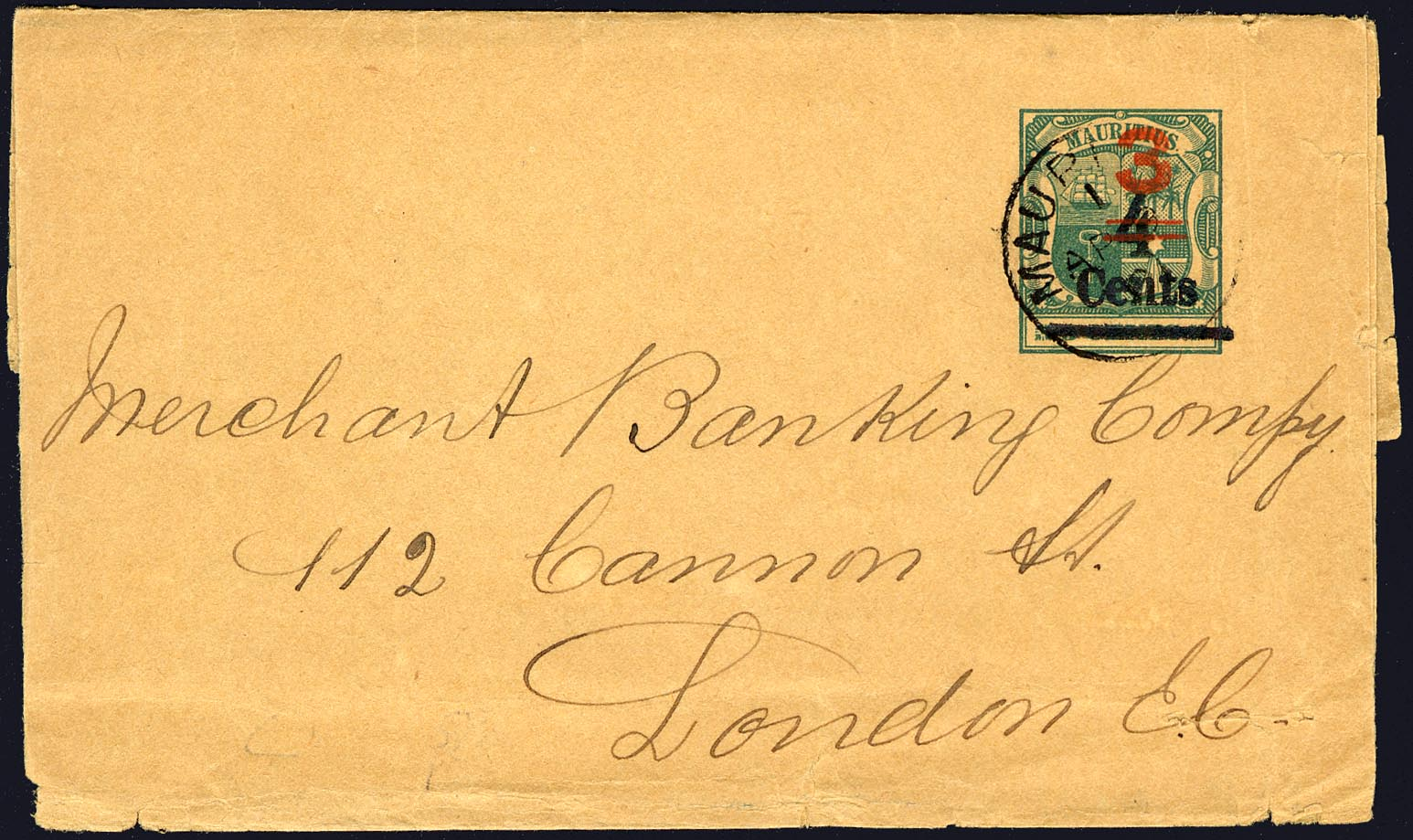
1896 Mauritius 3 cent newspaper wrapper overprinted 4 (in black) in 1898 and then 3 (in red) in 1899. Wrapper is postmarked 1906.

The first items of postal stationery to be issued by Mauritius were envelopes in 1861 followed by postcards in 1879 and registered envelopes in 1891. Newspaper wrappers were first issued in 1896 and lettercards were first issued in 1909. All these items of postal stationery were last issued in 1938 and when stocks run out they were discontinued. Aerogrammes were first issued in 1953 and are the only items of postal stationery currently available.

== See also ==
- Blue Penny Museum
- Mauritius Post
- Revenue stamps of Mauritius
- Postal codes in Mauritius

== References and sources ==
Sources

- Hiroyuki Kanai, Classic Mauritius, Stanley Gibbons, London (1981) ISBN 0852592515—an illustrated work on the author's famous Mauritius collection, including photos of reconstructed plates, postmarks and postal history.
- David Feldman SA, Mauritius: Classic Postage Stamps and Postal History, Switzerland (1993), illustrated auction catalog including the Kanai collection (see above), with Supplement providing detailed information on plating positions of the "Post Paid" and the "Lapirot" issues in their different states.
