= Paositra Malagasy =

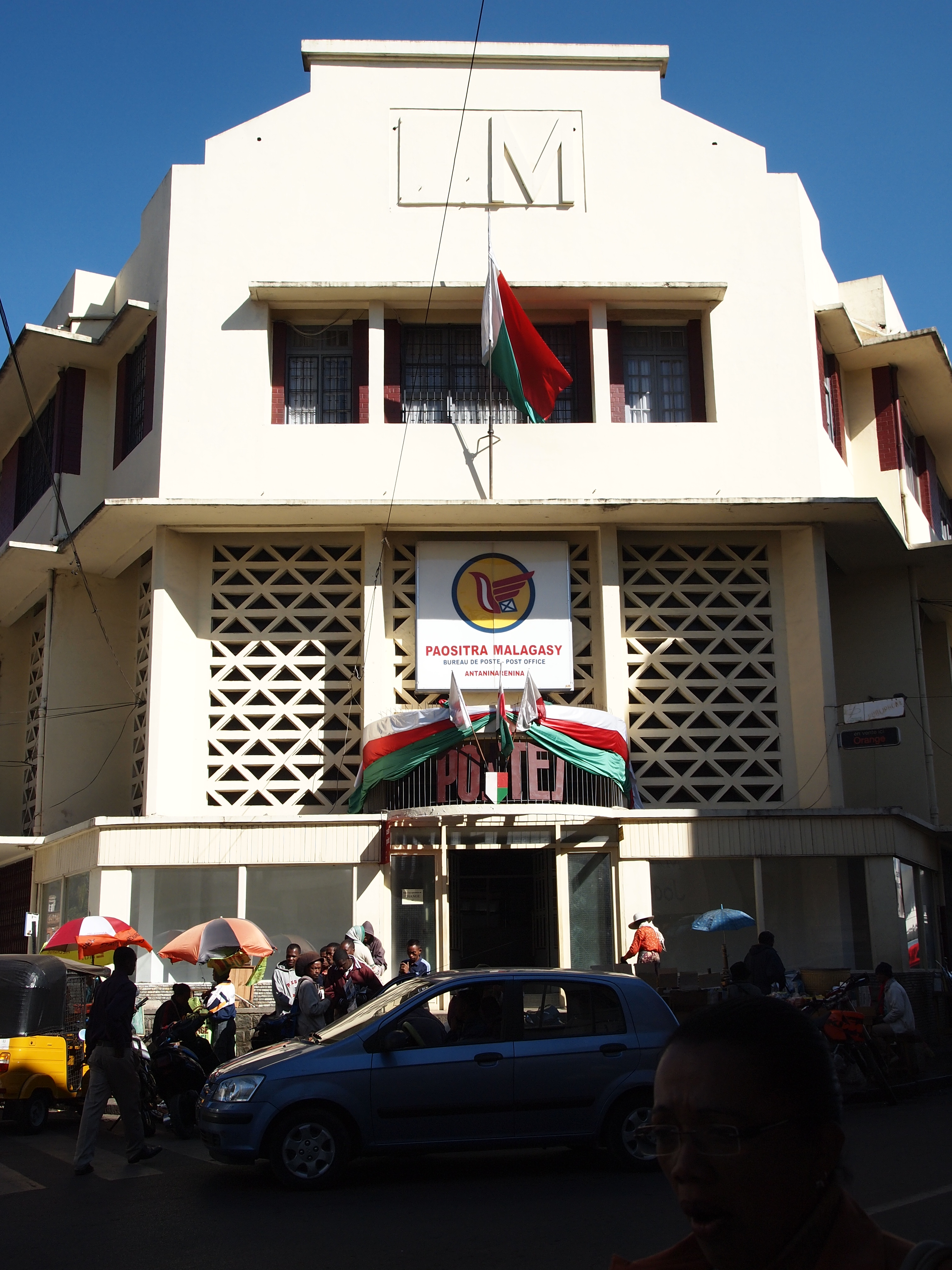
- Post office in Antananarivo
- Industry: Courier
- Headquarters: Antananarivo, Madagascar
- Area served: Worldwide
- Key people: Richard RANARISON (managing director)
- Services: Package delivery, EMS, freight forwarding, third-party logistics
- Website: www.paositramalagasy.mg

Paositra Malagasy is the national postal service of Madagascar. It is responsible for providing postal services and delivery of mail and packages within the country and to international destinations. Paositra Malagasy is headquartered in Antananarivo, the capital of Madagascar.

== History ==
Since 1998, Paositra Malagasy used the EMS system to process express mail services.

In May 2014, the Paositra Malagasy inaugurated its remodeled offices, and unveiled a new logo. That same year, 4 cars and 15 bikes were donated to the company by the Ministry of Postal services, but the Minister insisted that Paositra Malagasy adopted a universal postal system and electronic money transfer capabilities.

In 2018, Paositra Malagasy's CEO Nirina Augustin Rakatoamalala was replaced by Richard Ranarison.
