= Burnett Collection =

The Burnett Collection is a collection of Hyderabad stamps, postal stationery, and postal history material formed by A.H. Burnett and given to the British Library by his sons A.D. and R.G. Burnett in 1991. It forms part of the British Library Philatelic Collections.

== See also ==
- Postage stamps and postal history of the Indian states
