= Mauritius "Post Office" stamps =

Rare postage stamps

Mauritius "Post Office" Stamps
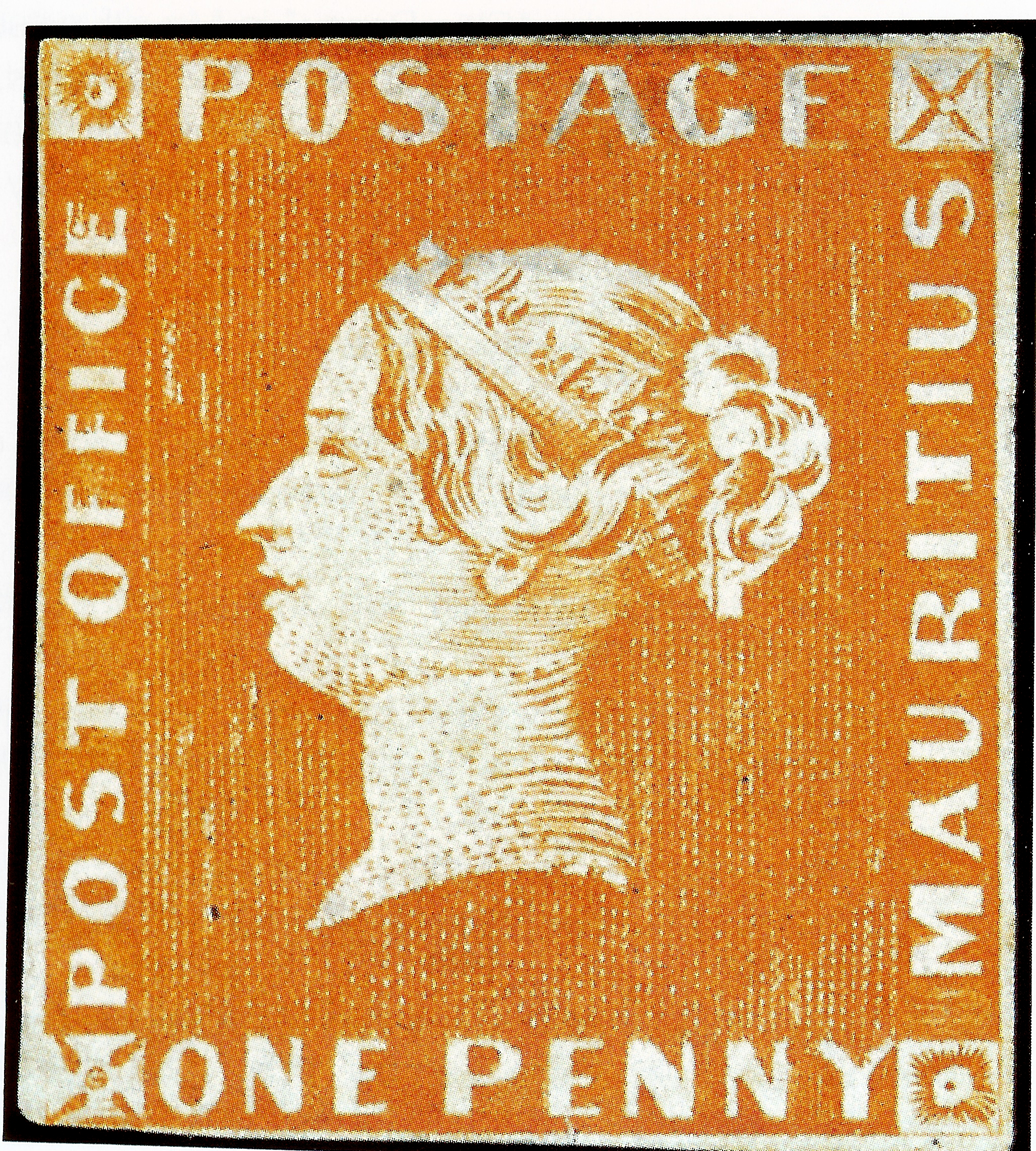
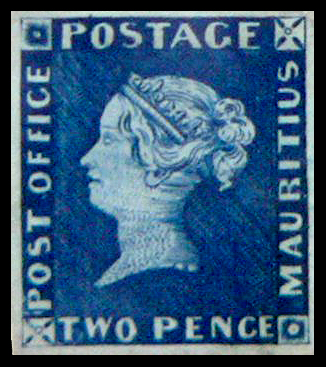
- Country of production: Mauritius
- Date of production: 21 September 1847
- Perforation: None
- Depicts: Queen Victoria
- Nature of rarity: First British Empire stamps produced outside Great Britain
- No. in existence: 27 (as of 1981)
- Face value: Orange red: one penny; Deep blue: two pence
- Estimated value: €8.1 million red on cover (last sale, 2021)

The Mauritius "Post Office" stamps were issued by the British Colony Mauritius in September 1847, in two denominations: an orange-red one penny (1d) and a deep blue two pence (2d). Their name comes from the wording on the stamps reading "Post Office", which was soon changed in the next issue to "Post Paid". They are among the rarest postage stamps in the world.

== The stamps' history ==
They were engraved by Joseph Osmond Barnard, born in England in 1816, who stowed away on a ship to Mauritius in 1838. The designs were based on the then current issue of Great Britain stamps (first released in 1841), bearing the profile head of Queen Victoria and issued in two denominations in similar colours: one penny red brown and Two Pence Blue. Although these locally produced stamps have a distinct primitive character, they made Barnard's "name immortal in the postal history of Mauritius".

Five hundred of each stamp were printed from a single plate bearing one engraving of each value, and issued on September 21, 1847 - many of which were used on invitations sent out by the wife of the Governor of Mauritius for a ball she was holding that weekend. The stamps were printed using the intaglio method (recessed printing), and bear the engraver's initials "JB" at the lower right margin of the bust.

The words "Post Office" appear in the left panel, but on the following issue in 1848, these words were replaced by "Post Paid". A legend arose later that the words "Post Office" had been an error.

The stamps, as well as the subsequent issues, are highly prized by collectors because of their rarity, their early dates and their primitive character as local products. Surviving stamps are mainly in the hands of private collectors, but some are on public display in the British Library in London, including the envelope of an original invitation to the Governor's ball complete with stamp. Another example is included in the Royal Collection of King Charles III, and a third in private hands. Two other places where they can be seen, in Mauritius, are at the Postal Museum and at the Blue Penny Museum, both in Port Louis, the capital city. The two stamps also can be seen at the Museum for Communication (Museum für Kommunikation) in Berlin and in the Postal Museum of Sweden in Stockholm. A two pence blue is also at display at the Museum for Communication (Museum voor Communicatie) in The Hague.

== The "Post Office" versus "Post Paid" myth ==
In 1928, Georges Brunel published Les Timbres-Poste de l'Île Maurice in which he stated that the use of the words "Post Office" on the 1847 issue had been an error. Over the years, the story was embellished. One version was that the man who produced the stamps, Joseph Osmond Barnard, was a half-blind watchmaker and an old man who absent-mindedly forgot what he was supposed to print on the stamps. On his way from his shop to visit the postmaster, a Mr. Brownrigg, he passed a post office with a sign hanging above it. This provided the necessary jog to his memory and he returned to his work and finished engraving the plates for the stamps, substituting "Post Office" for "Post Paid". This story appears to have arisen from the book by Brunel in 1928.

These stories are purely fictional; philatelic scholars have confirmed that the "Post Office" inscription was intentional. Adolphe and d'Unienville wrote that "It is much more likely that Barnard used 'Post Office' because this was, and still is, the legal denomination of the government department concerned". The plates were approved and the stamps issued without any fuss at the time. Joseph Barnard was an Englishman of Jewish descent from Portsmouth who had arrived in Mauritius in 1838 as a stowaway, thrown off a commercial vessel bound for Sydney. He was not a watch-maker, although he may have turned his hand to watch repairs; not half-blind; and certainly not old; he was born in 1816 and was therefore 31 years old when he engraved the stamps in 1847. In addition, several rubber stamps used in Mauritius on letters prior to these stamps also used the words "Post Office", as did the first two stamps issued by the United States in July 1847.

== Philatelic discovery ==
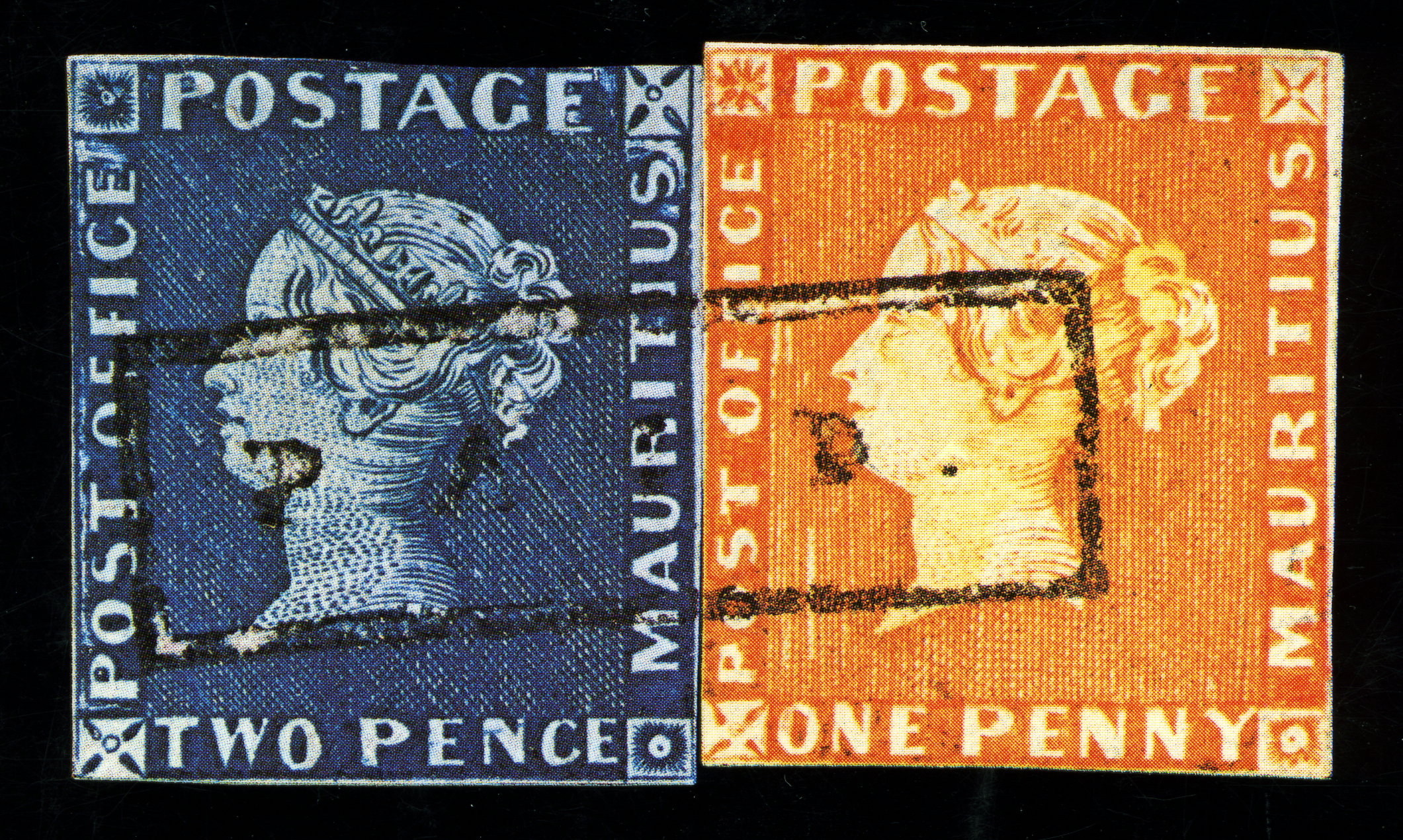
The Post Office pair at the 1985 Jakubek auction

The Mauritius "Post Office" stamps were unknown to the philatelic world until 1864 when Mme. Borchard, the wife of a Bordeaux merchant, found copies of the one penny and two pence stamps in her husband's correspondence. She traded them to another collector. Through a series of sales, the stamps ultimately were acquired by the famous collector Philipp von Ferrary, and were sold at auction in 1921.

Over the years, the stamps sold for increasing and ultimately astronomical prices. Mauritius "Post Office" stamps and covers have been prize items in collections of famous stamp collectors, including Sir Ernest de Silva, Henry J. Duveen, Arthur Hind, William Beilby Avery, Alfred F. Lichtenstein, and Alfred H. Caspary, among other philatelic luminaries. The future King George V paid £1,450 for an unused blue Two Pence "Post Office" at an auction in 1904, which was a world record price at the time. Adjusting by inflation rate it is about £150,000 in 2025.

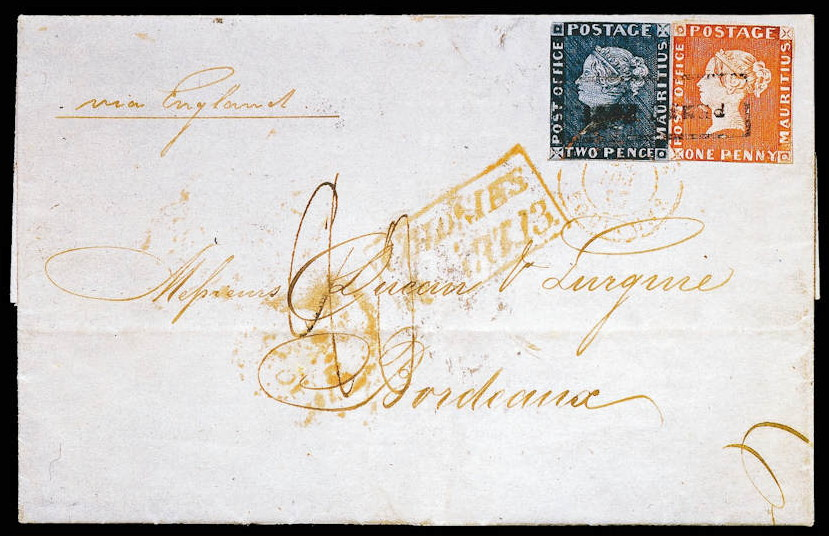
"Bordeaux Cover" with Mauritius 1d Red and 2d Deep Blue "Post Office" auctioned for CHF 5,750,000 in 1993 (equivalent to CHF 6.6 million in 2021).

The next day, one of his secretaries reportedly commented that "some damned fool" had paid a huge amount of money for one postage stamp, to which George replied, "I am that damned fool". By 2002, the "Mauritius blue" was estimated to be worth £2 million.

The greatest of all Mauritius collections, that of Hiroyuki Kanai, included unused copies of both the One Penny and Two Pence "Post Office" stamps, the unique "Bordeaux" cover with both the one penny and two pence stamps which has been called "la pièce de résistance de toute la philatélie" or "the greatest item in all philately", and numerous reconstructed sheets of the subsequent issues. Kanai’s collection was sold by the auctioneer David Feldman in 1993, the Bordeaux cover going for the equivalent of about $4 million. In July 2021 at Christoph Gartner's 50th auction sale, a 'Ball Invitation' sent by the Governor's wife, Lady Gomme, sold for over 11 million euros (including buyers commission) making it the most expensive philatelic item ever sold at auction.

== Subsequent issues ==
The subsequent issues are discussed in Postage stamps and postal history of Mauritius.

== Reprints and forgeries ==
The "Post Office" stamps have been reprinted from the original plates and, like many other rare postage stamps, have been forged many times.

== In popular culture ==
One of the "Post Office" stamps is the MacGuffin in a 1962 episode of The Avengers titled "The Mauritius Penny". Theresa Rebeck's play Mauritius is about two sisters who inherit a stamp collection perhaps worth a fortune, which includes both the deep blue two penny and the orange one penny "Post Office" stamps (to which the title refers). One of the Billy Bunter novels is titled "Billy Bunter and the Blue Mauritius", where the blue two pence stamp is stolen and recovered.

The Case of the One-Penny Orange (1977) by E. V. Cunningham, the pen name of Howard Fast, was the first of a series of novels in which Beverly Hills detective Masao Masuto is assigned to solve the murder of a well-known stamp dealer. Masuto quickly realizes that the incredible passion felt by stamp collectors for rare stamps, especially the 1847 One-Penny Orange, can lead to almost anything, even murder.

The radio serial Harry Nile had an episode titled "The Mauritius Orange" about the one penny stamp.

== See also ==
- List of notable postage stamps
- List of most expensive philatelic items
- Mauritius Post
- Penny Black
- Mauritius (play)
