= Primitive (philately) =

In philately, primitives, also called natives, are postage stamps that were crudely designed and printed as compared with the sophisticated productions of industrialized countries such as the United Kingdom or the United States. A number of such stamps were produced in the classic stamp period in remote or undeveloped locales such as Mauritius. Due to their charm and sometimes rarity, primitives are among the most popular stamps with stamp collectors.

Several well known primitives copied the designs of standard postage stamps of major countries. For example, the early stamps of Mauritius were crude, locally produced copies of the then current postage stamps of the United Kingdom. Similarly, the stamps of Corrientes, a province in northern Argentina, were inept imitations of earlier stamps of France, depicting the agricultural goddess Ceres. Other primitives are of their own unique design.

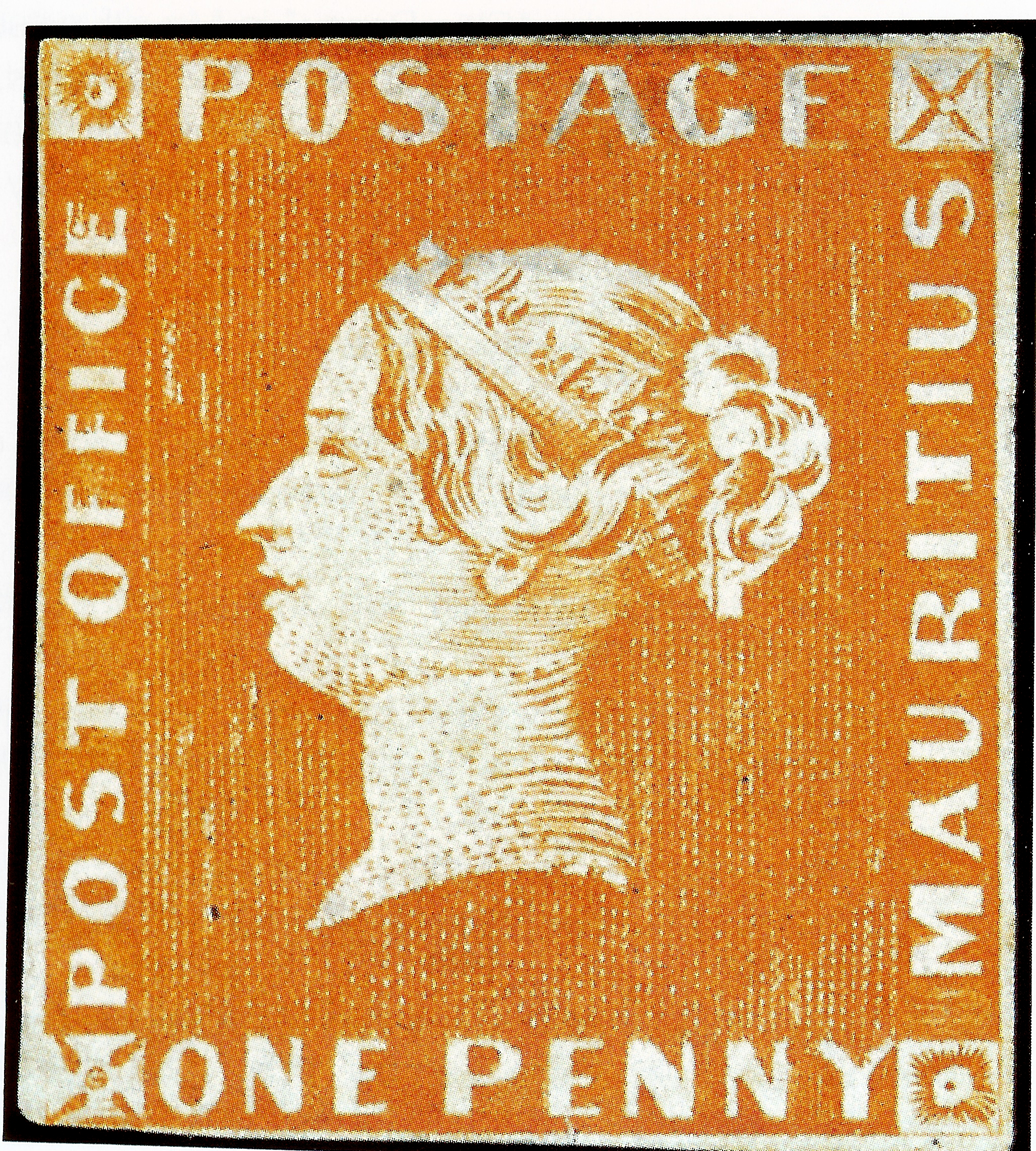
Mauritius "Post Office", 1847

Penny Red, United Kingdom, 1841

Mauritius primitive and model

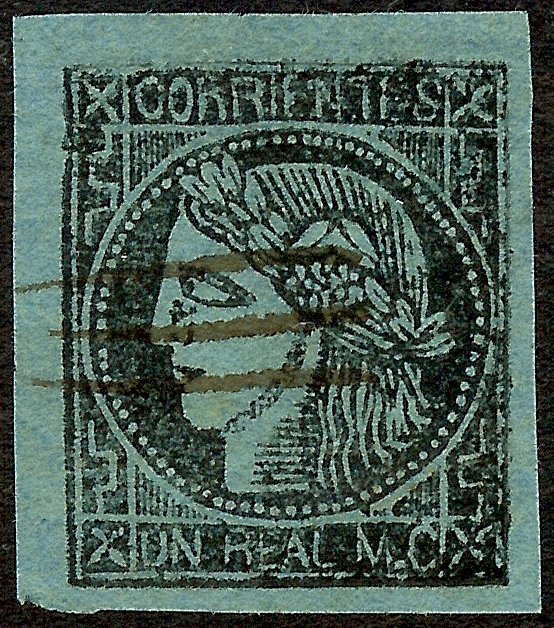
Corrientes stamp, 1856

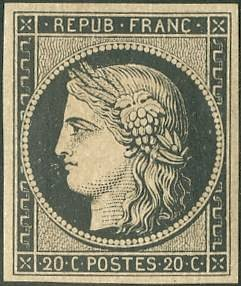
Ceres series (France), 1849

Corrientes primitive and model

Other primitives include the following:

- British Guiana "Cottonreels", 1850–51.
- Cape of Good Hope Wood block triangle stamps of 1861.
- India stamps of 1854.
- Various Indian Native Feudatory State stamps.
- Some early stamps of Mexico
- New Caledonia Napoleon III, 1859.
