= Revenue stamps of Mauritius =

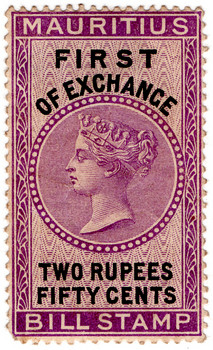
An 1890 2r50c bill stamp of Mauritius.

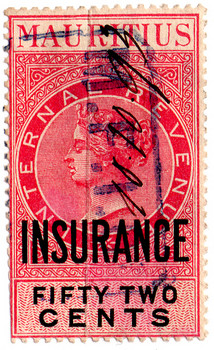
An 1879 52c insurance stamp.

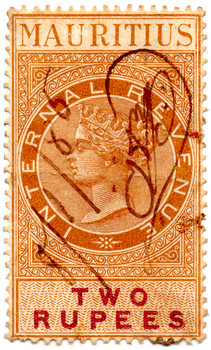
An 1879 2r internal revenue stamp.

Mauritius issued revenue stamps from 1 March 1869 to 1904. There were various types of fiscal stamps for different uses.

== Bill of Exchange (1869-1904) ==
The first bill stamps of Mauritius were issued on 28 March 1869. They were locally lithographed and imperforate, with values ranging from 1d to 16s8d in various colours. They were printed in triplets inscribed First, Second or Third of Exchange for use on triplicate documents. Later that year a new set portraying Queen Victoria was issued, also in triplets. Stamps in this design, with various changes in colour and currency, continued to be used until 1903. In 1904 a new type appeared, similar to the design used for high value postage stamps, but with a blank value tablet and in green. These were then overprinted BILLS ONLY FIRST (or SECOND or THIRD) OF EXCHANGE and the value. Two slightly different formats exist.

Between and 1896 and 1898 some of these were overprinted for use in the Seychelles. There were also some provisional overprints printed there, and some of these are very rare and some possibly unique.

== Inland Revenue (1889-1898) ==
In 1889, two 4c postage stamps, in the normal and in special colours, were overprinted INLAND REVENUE. A year later a single 4c stamp was issued in lilac, and in 1898 this was reprinted in green. All four stamps of this type of revenue are common and are easy to obtain.

== Insurance (1869-1904) ==
The first insurance stamps of Mauritius were issued on 1 March 1869. They were Queen Victoria postage stamps handstamped INCE in black. From later that year to 1879, all insurance stamps were internal revenue stamps handstamped or overprinted INCE, sometimes the stamps were also surcharged. In 1879 a new set of internal revenue stamps but in new colours was overprinted INSURANCE in black. In 1904 a new type appeared, similar to the design used for high value postage stamps, but with a blank value tablet and in purple. These were then overprinted INSURANCE ONLY and the value. Three different formats exist.

== Internal Revenue (1869-c.1900) ==
The first internal revenue stamps of Mauritius were issued on 1 October 1869. The first issue consisted of twelve values ranging from 1d to £1, each stamp portraying Queen Victoria. Stamps in this design continued to be issued until c.1900, with various changes in watermark, currency and colour. Between 1885 and 1894 there were a number of provisional surcharges.

Some internal revenue stamps, sometimes in special colours, were overprinted for use as Insurance stamps between 1869 and 1879. Between c.1892 and 1895 some were also overprinted for use in the Seychelles.

== Other revenues ==
Mauritius also had imprinted stamps in the 1820s, colourless embossed stamps from the 1860s to 1910, and embossed stamps in vermilion from 1963 to 1971.

== See also ==
- Postage stamps and postal history of Mauritius
- Revenue stamps of Seychelles
