= Hiroyuki Kanai =

Japanese businessman, writer and philatelist

Kanai Hiroyuki
- Kanai Hiroyuki in 2011
- Born: 16 May 1925; Amagasaki
- Died: 26 January 2012 (aged 86); Osaka
- Occupations: Businessman writer Philatelist

Hiroyuki Kanai (金井 宏之, Kanai Hiroyuki; 16 May 1925 in Amagasaki – 26 January 2012) was a Japanese businessman, writer and philatelist.

== Life ==
Kanai's father was a wealthy Japanese businessman and at the age of five he began his first stamp collection. At 13, he intensified his hobby and while in university founded two stamp collecting clubs. His first degree was in engineering at Nihon University after which he studied political economy at Waseda University. He then worked for the textile machinery factory founded by one of his grandfathers. Later, he became president of a number of companies such as the Kanai Heavy Industry Co.

== Philately ==
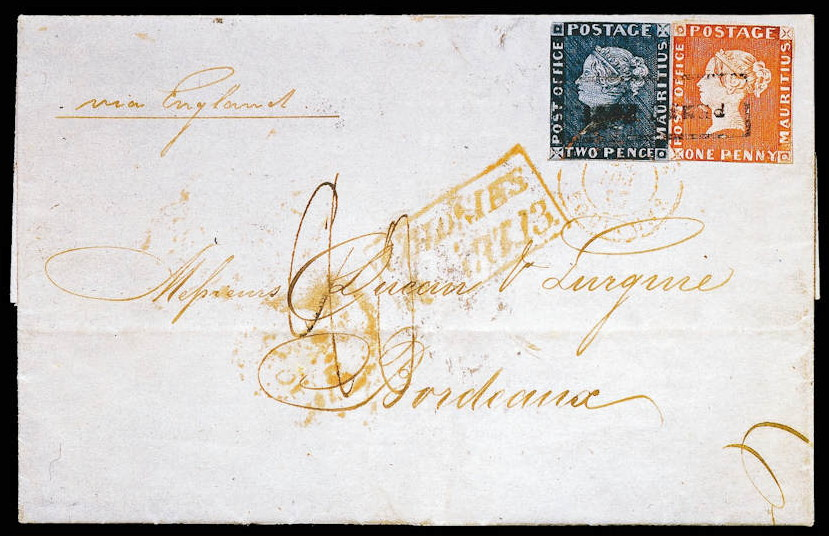
Bordeaux Cover with 1d red and 2d deep blue Mauritius "Post Office" stamps sold by Kanai in 1988 was last auctioned for CHF 5,750,000 in 1993

At first, Kanai was a general stamp collector but after World War II he specialised in the philately of Japan, Finland and the British colonies. Through philatelic contacts he became aware of and eventually owned a unique collection of the Red and Blue Mauritius "Post Office" stamps, when he procured a total of six pieces of 27 known copies of these valuable stamps, which was the largest ever owned by one person. In 1971, he bought the Bordeaux Letter, a cover with both the one penny red and two pence blue stamps addressed to Bordeaux, for 120 million yen, equivalent in purchasing power to about 390 million yen in 2024. In 1988, he initially sold the Bordeaux Letter; the balance of the Kanai's Mauritius stamps were sold by David Feldman in 1993 at a Zurich auction. That part of the Kanai collection, being 183 pages of the classic issues of Mauritius, is listed by the Guinness World Records as the "Most expensive stamp collection". He received many awards and worked most recently as Director of the Stamp Museum Kobe.

== Awards ==
- Japanese Medal of Honor: Blue Ribbon
- Lichtenstein award 1991
- Roll of Distinguished Philatelists 1993

== Works ==
- Mauritius no kitte: 1847–59 (モーリシャスの切手:1847–59). Gaikoku Kitte Kenkyūkai (Ausländische-Briefmarken-Forschungsgesellschaft) Ōsaka, 1976.
- Hōsun no miryoku (方寸の魅力). Sōgensha, Ōsaka, 1980.
- Classic Mauritius: The Locally Printed Postage Stamps. Stanley Gibbons, London, 1981. ISBN 0852592515
- Hōsun itto (方寸一途). Yūshu Bunka Center (Philatelie-Kulturzentrum), Ōsaka, 1991.
