= Postage stamps and postal history of Seychelles =

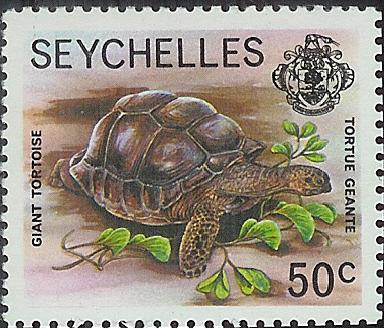
Giant tortoise on a 1977 Seychelles stamp

This is a survey of the postage stamps and postal history of Seychelles, a 115 island nation spanning an archipelago in the Indian Ocean, some 1,500 kilometres (932 mi) east of mainland Africa, northeast of the island of Madagascar. Seychelles was administered as a dependency of Mauritius from 1810 to 1903. Independence was granted in 1976.

== First mails ==
From 1848, stamps of Mauritius were used on mail from Seychelles and are found with the cancel B64 from that year.

The first post office in the Seychelles was opened at Victoria, on Mahe, on 11 December 1861 and stamps of Mauritius were used there until 1890. The next post office in Seychelles was not opened until 1901.

== First stamps of Seychelles ==
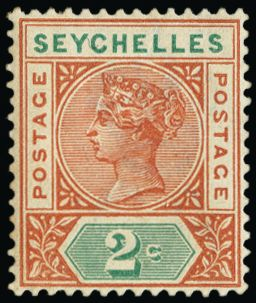
A Queen Victoria 2c stamp of Seychelles

The first stamps marked Seychelles were issued on 5 April 1890 and were of a Queen Victoria key type design. A number of different issues followed, all of the same design, including surcharges in 1893 and 1901.

== King Edward VII and King George V ==
Further key type stamps were issued for these monarchs from 1906.

== King George VI ==
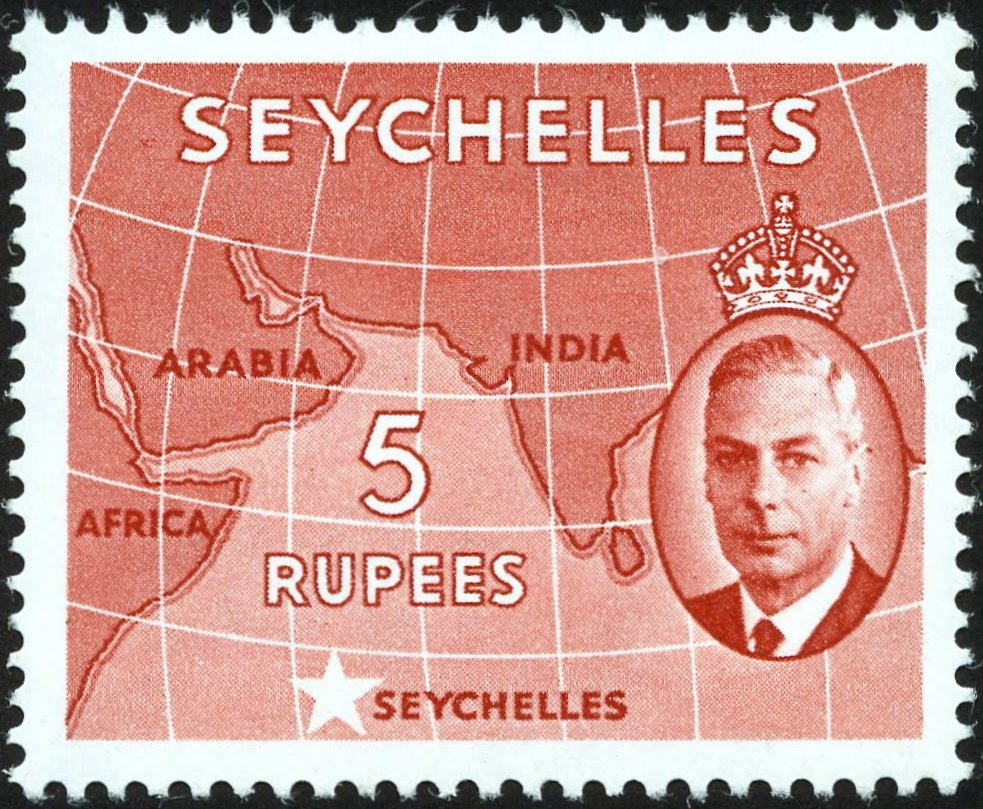
Position of Seychelles on a 1952 stamp

In 1937, Seychelles participated in the omnibus stamp issue for the coronation of King George VI and three stamps were issued. In 1938 a distinctive series of definitive stamps were issued, printed in photogravure by Harrison & Sons which marked a departure in the design of British colonial stamps. The stamps were reissued in 1952 with a new portrait of the King with a crown over it.

== Queen Elizabeth II ==
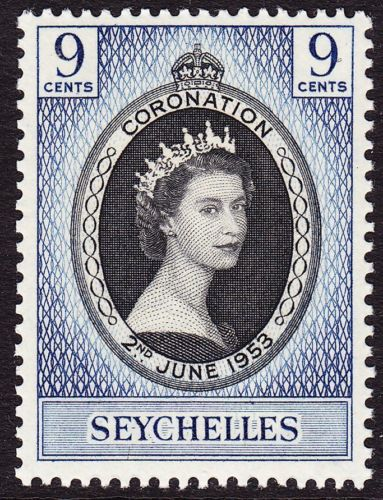
The Seychelles 1953 coronation stamp

In 1953, Seychelles participated in the omnibus stamp issue for the coronation of Queen Elizabeth II and one stamp was issued. In 1954, the definitive stamps of 1938 were revised to include the head of Queen Elizabeth II. Regular commemorative and definitive stamp issues have followed. The head of Queen Elizabeth II, or the Initials E II R, were dropped from Seychelles stamps on independence in 1976.

== Gallery ==
The same stamp of Seychelles as originally issued in 1938 for King George VI, with revised head 1952, and for Queen Elizabeth II, 1954. All photogravure, Harrison & Sons.

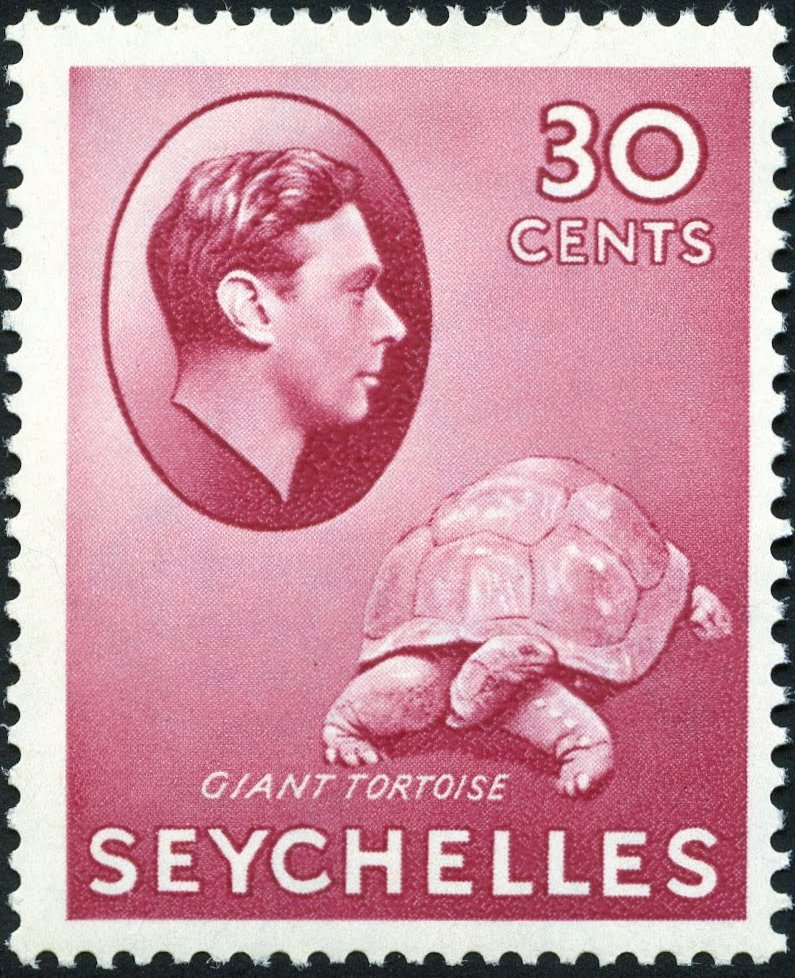
30c, KGVI, 1938

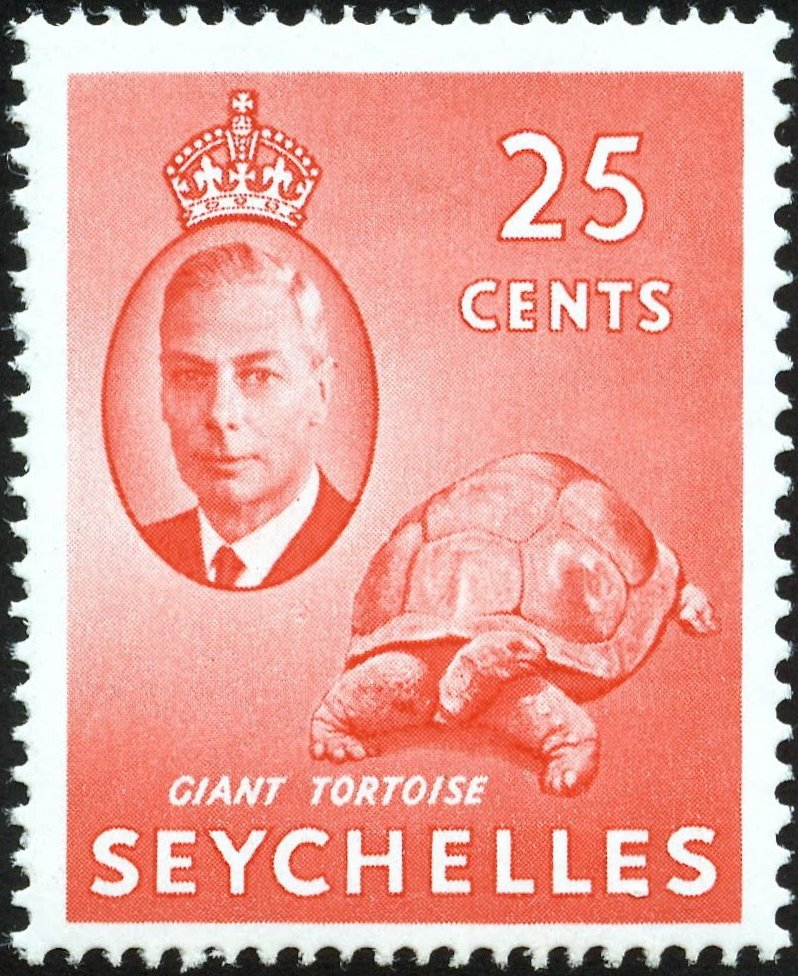
25c, KGVI, 1952

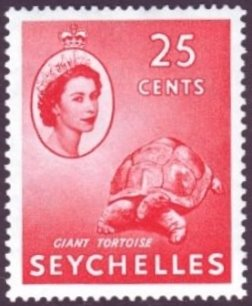
25c, QEII, 1954

== Zil Eloigne Sesel, Zil Elwagne Sesel and Zil Elwannyen Sesel ==
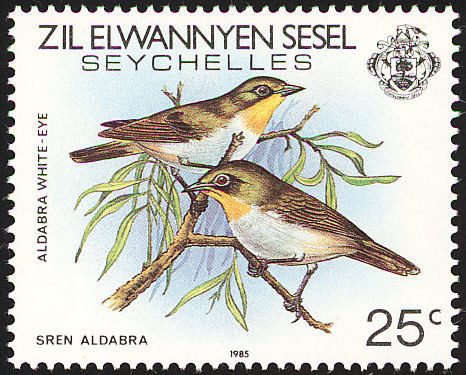
A 1985 Zil Elwannyen Sesel stamp

Stamps marked Zil Eloigne Sesel (1980–1982), Zil Elwagne Sesel (1982–1984) and Zil Elwannyen Sesel (1985–1992) were issued for the Seychelles outer islands of Aldabra, Coetivy, Farquhar and Amirante. These islands were served by the travelling post office on the M.V. Cinq-Juin. Issues ceased in 1992.

== See also ==
- Revenue stamps of Seychelles
