= Postal codes in Mauritius =

Post codes in Mauritius consist of five digits (or a letter and four digits for an island). They were first introduced by Mauritius Post on a pilot basis, from January to March 2012, in Lallmatie, Bon Accueil and Brisée Verdière before being introduced in other localities across the island before the system went nationwide on 15 August 2014.

== Format ==
The postcode is added after the name of the town or village, as follows:

Mr. and Mrs. John Ferguson
21, Old Trafford Road
Mission Cross
Lalmatie 42602
MAURITIUS

The first digit of the code indicates the District Code in this case Flacq District, the second and third digits indicate Village Council Area Code for the town of Lalmatie, while the fourth and fifth digits indicate the Sub-Locality Code.

=== The first character ===
The first character of the code indicates the district when it is a number, or an island when it is a letter:

First Postal Code Character	Region
1	Port Louis
2	Pamplemousses
3	Rivière du Rempart
4	Flacq
5	Grand Port
6	Savanne
7	Plaines Wilhems
8	Moka
9	Rivière Noire
A	Agaléga
R	Rodrigues

== Earlier trial ==
An earlier trial of postcodes was made in the Curepipe area in 2002, consisting of an eight-digit alphanumeric code added before the name of the town.

742CU001  
R.DU.REMPART 
MAURITIUS
