= Postage stamps and postal history of the Indian states =

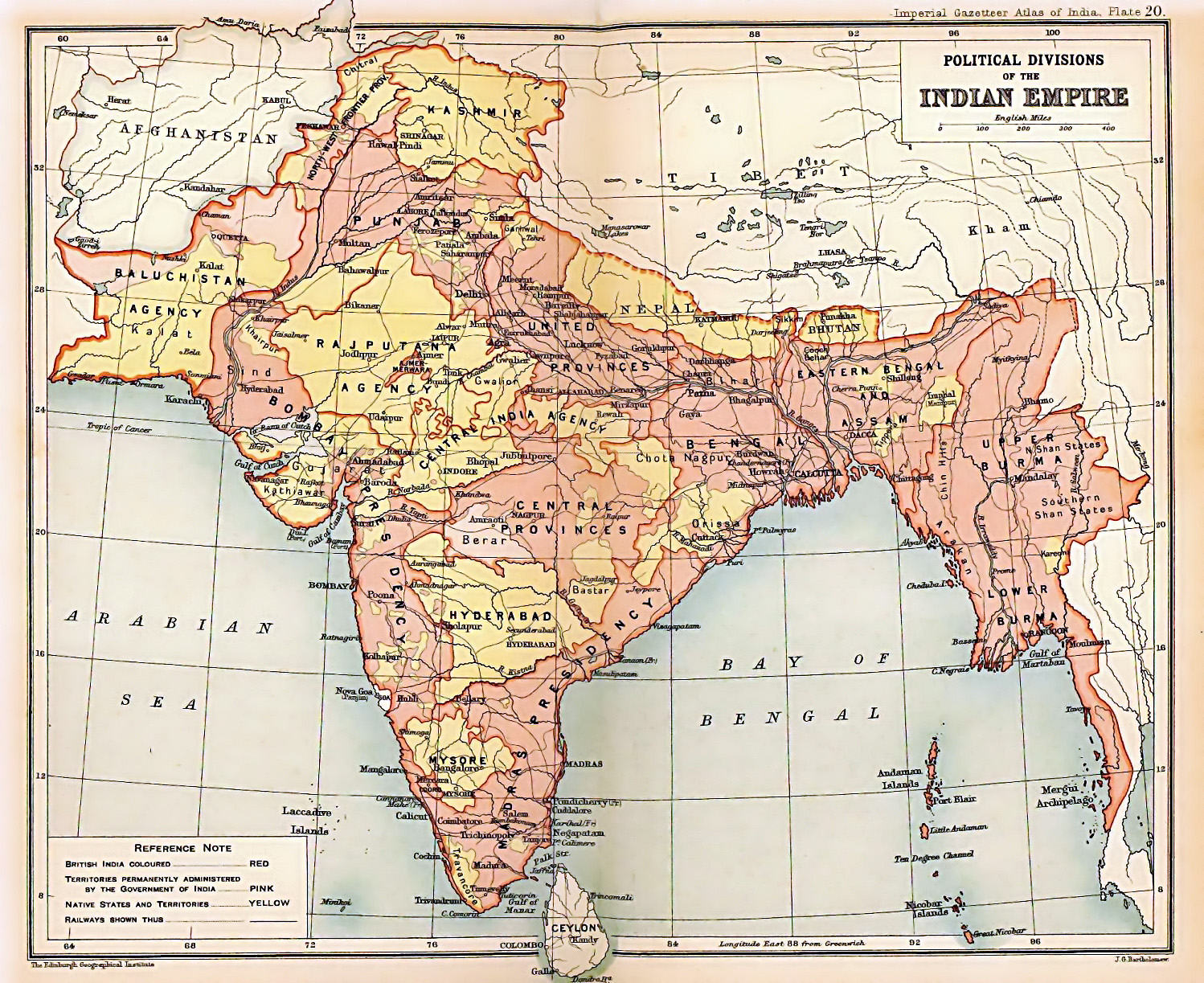
British Indian Empire as shown in the 1909 Imperial Gazetteer of India

The native states of India, also known as feudatory or princely states, were typically vassals under a local or regional ruler who owed allegiance to the British Raj. There were about 675 native states in all but many were not parts of British India proper because they never become possessions of the British Crown; rather, they were tied to it in a system of subsidiary alliances. Following the Partition of India in 1947, the suzerainty of the Raj was terminated and native states had to choose between independence or formal accession by either India or Pakistan. In practice, all of the native states had acceded or been annexed by the end of 1949.

For postal purposes, many native states ran their own services and their stamp issues have been termed feudatory by the main catalogues such as Stanley Gibbons Ltd. (Note: The most widely accepted catalogue for postage stamps of the Indian States is published by Stanley Gibbons Ltd. Elsewhere, a wealth of information resides in articles that have been published in journals like the Philatelic Journal of India, the India Post (published by the India Study Circle), the London Philatelist (published by the Royal Philatelic Society London), and others that are available at many of the philatelic libraries (see List of philatelic libraries).) There were exceptions in the form of six convention states who made separate postal arrangements with the Raj and used British India stamps that were overprinted with the state's name.

== Stamp-issuing native states ==
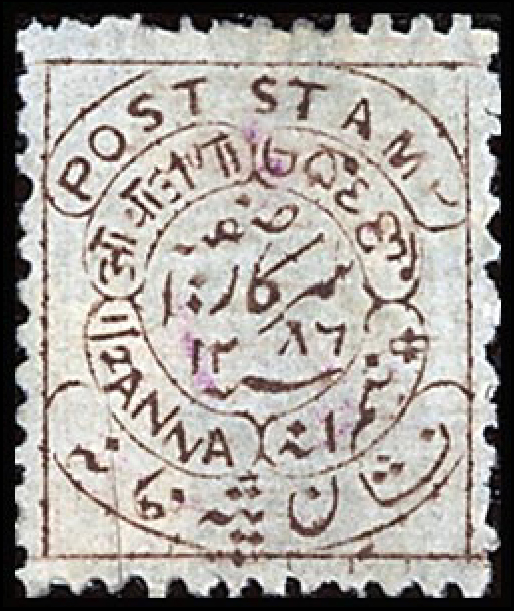
One of the earliest postage stamps of Hyderabad state, the half-anna 1871 Stanley Gibbons ser 4

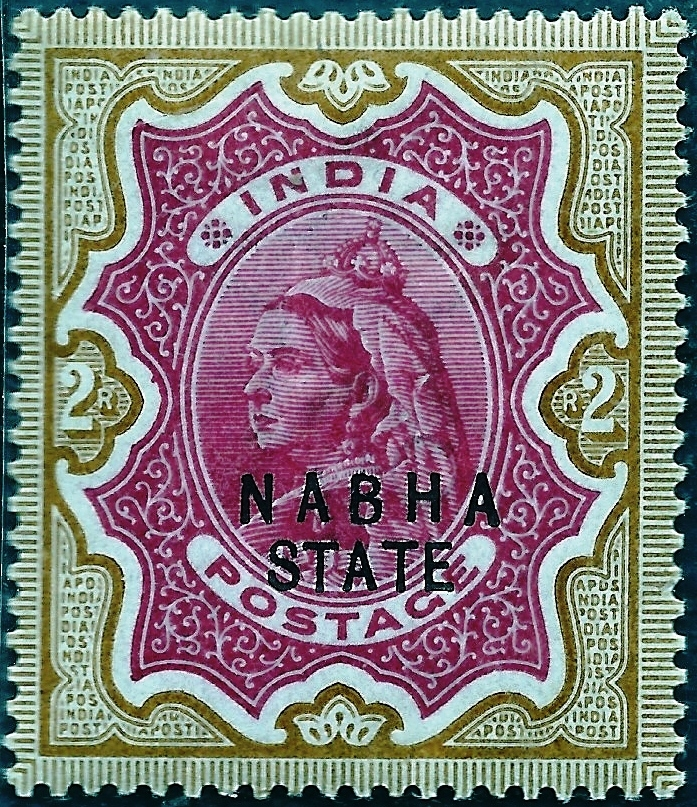
Two rupees 1897 Queen Victoria head of Nabha, a convention state

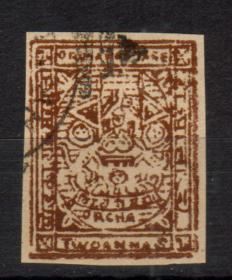
Two anna red-brown 1916 postage stamp of Orchha state

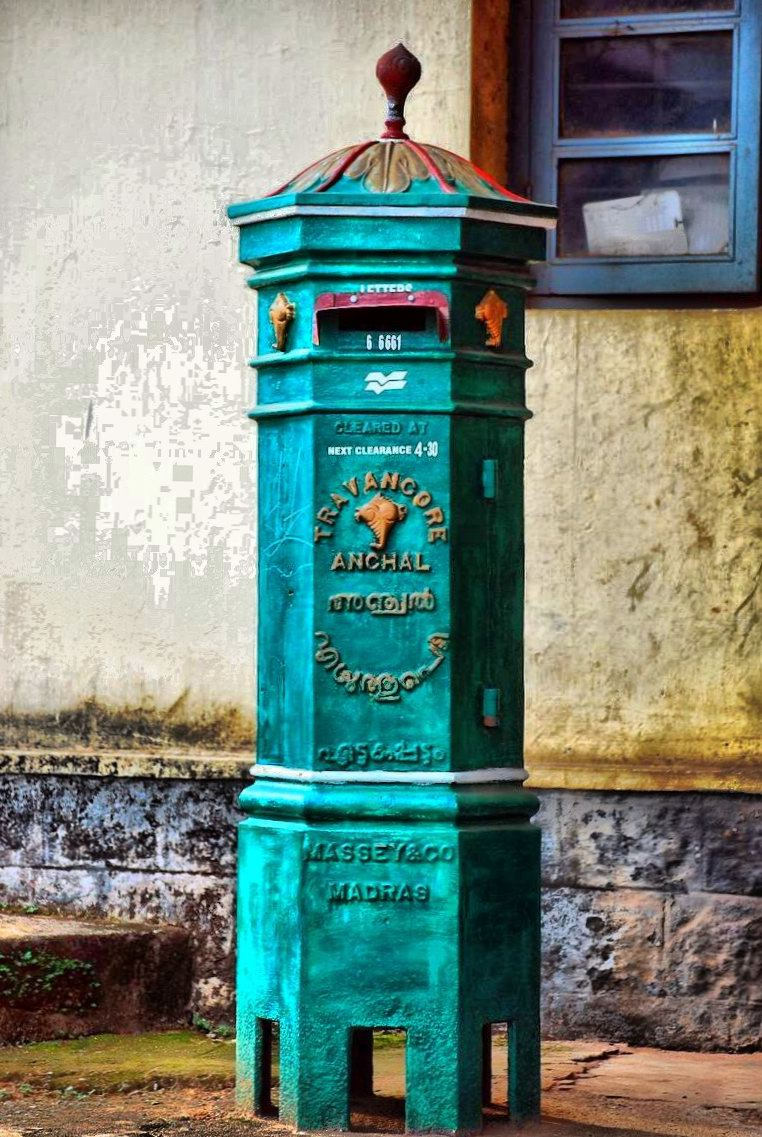
A post box from Travancore period known as Anchal petty still being used in Kerala

The native states which issued postage stamps have been categorised as either convention states or feudatory states. The words 'convention' and 'feudatory' in this sense referred solely to postal arrangements with or in relation to British India.

In all, there were some 675 feudatory states at various times, but not all issued postal stamps and/or stationery. Many of the first issues were printed locally, using primitive methods such as typography and so they can be very rare. There was low quality of printing and design in many cases and collectors sometimes informally refer to them as "Uglies". All remaining feudatory issues were replaced by stamps of the Republic of India on 1 April 1950 and most were declared obsolete from 1 May 1950 – there was one exception in the Anchal stamps of Travancore-Cochin which remained current until 1 July 1951.

There were six convention states: Chamba, Faridkot, Gwalior, Jind, Nabha and Patiala. They all used stamps of British India which were overprinted (Note: The practice of overprinting is also referred to as "surcharging" though in most of these cases the monetary value of the postage stamp was never altered.) with the name of the state in Latin or Hindi/Urdu letters, or both. The Gibbons catalogue omits minor varieties of these stamps which had printing errors such as smaller letters, broken letters, unequal inking and unequal spacing. The convention issues were replaced by those of the Republic of India on 1 April 1950 but remained current until 31 December of that year, becoming obsolete from 1 January 1951.

The native states which issued stamps were as follows. Unless otherwise stated, the currency in use was 12 pies = 1 anna; 16 annas = 1 rupee. The dates are the starting and ending dates of stamp issue validity:

Native states of India which issued postage stamps, 1864–1951
State	From	To	Notes and citations
Alwar	1877	1902	A feudatory state in Rajputana, northern India. Issued five stamps with values of 1/4 or 1 anna. The last issue was released in 1901 and the stamps became obsolete towards the end of 1902.
Bamra	1888	1894	A feudatory state in the Central Provinces. Issued forty stamps with values ranging from 1/4 anna to 1 rupee. The last issue was released in 1893 and the stamps became obsolete during 1894.
Barwani	1921	1948	A feudatory state in what is now Madhya Pradesh. All stamps of Barwani are typographed. A total of 41 stamps were issued with values ranging from 1/4 anna to 4 annas. The stamps became obsolete on 1 July 1948, soon after the final issue.
Bhopal	1876	1949	A feudatory state in what is now Madhya Pradesh. Bhopal tried to remain independent after Partition but was effectively annexed by India on 1 June 1949. A total of 354 stamps were issued with values ranging from 3 pies to 1 rupee, the last in July 1949 and became obsolete from 1 May 1950.
Bhor	1879	1901	A feudatory state south-east of Bombay in what is now Maharashtra. Bhor was the only state belonging to the Poona Agency, under the Bombay Presidency. It became part of India on 8 March 1948. Only two officially recognised stamps were issued, both in 1879, with values of half an anna and one anna. The state's post offices were closed in 1895.
Bijawar	1935	1937	A feudatory state in the Central Provinces. A total of ten stamps were issued from 1935 to 1937 with values ranging from 3 pies to 1 rupee. These stamps were discontinued in 1939.
Bundi	1894	1950	A feudatory state in the northern region of Rajputana. Bundi issued 56 postal and 52 official stamps until it became part of the new state of Rajasthan in 1948. Along with Jaipur and Kishangarh, Bundi continued to run its own postal service within Rajasthan until 1 April 1950. In 1949, there was a further issue of seven Bundi stamps, carrying a Rajasthan handstamp (see also Rajasthan below).
Bussahir	1895	1901	
Chamba	1886	1948	A convention state.
Charkari	1894	1943	
Cochin	1892	1949	For later issues, see Travancore-Cochin.
Dhar	1897	1901	
Duttia	1893	1920	
Faridkot	1879	1901	Faridkot was a Cis-Sutlej Sikh feudatory state which issued its own stamps from 1879 before joining the postal convention on 1 January 1887.
Gwalior	1885	1949	A convention state.
Hyderabad	1869	1950	
Idar	1939	1944	
Indore	1886	1947	
Jaipur	1904	1949	
Jammu	1867	1877	
Jammu and Kashmir	1866	1894	
Jasdan	1942	1948	
Jhalawar	1887	1890	
Jind	1874	1948	Jind was a Cis-Sutlej feudatory state which issued its own stamps from 1874 before joining the postal convention in July 1885; its stamps from the feudatory period became invalid for postage, but they continued to be used for revenue purposes.
Kashmir	1866	1878	
Kishangarh	1899	1947	
Morvi	1931	1948	
Nabha	1885	1948	A Cis-Sutlej convention state.
Nandgaon	1892	1895	
Nowanuggur	1877	1895	
Orchha	1913	1942	
Patiala	1884	1947	A Cis-Sutlej convention state.
Poonch	1876	1894	
Rajasthan	1949	1950	
Rajpipla	1880	1886	
Shahpura	1914	1948	
Sirmoor	1879	1902	
Soruth	1864	1950	
Travancore	1888	1947	
Travancore-Cochin	1949	1951	
Wadhwan	1888	1892	

== See also ==
- Postage stamps and postal history of Bahawalpur (1945–1949)
