= Revenue stamps of Seychelles =

Revenue stamps of Seychelles were first issued in 1893, when the islands were a dependency of the British Crown Colony of Mauritius. The first stamps were Mauritius Internal Revenue stamps depicting Queen Victoria overprinted for use in Seychelles, and Bill stamps were also similarly overprinted. Postage stamps depicting Victoria or Edward VII were overprinted for fiscal use at various points between 1894 and 1904, while surcharges on Bill stamps were made in around 1897–98.

New stamps depicting Edward VII and George V were issued in 1906 and 1915 respectively. Some postage stamps were overprinted once again in the 1920s, but unoverprinted postage stamps were later used for fiscal purposes. In the 1980s, a single stamp was issued to pay the Passenger Service Fee, and this was replaced passenger coupons in the 1990s. Impressed duty stamps and embossed stamp papers were probably used from the 1900s to the 1960s, but have not been recorded as issued stamps. One pre-printed cheque stamp is known to have been used in the late 1960s.

Most Seychelles revenue stamps are scarce.

== General-duty revenues ==
The first essay for a Seychelles revenue stamp was produced in 1889, and it depicted Queen Victoria and had a key type design. It was accepted and colour trials were produced in 1892, but stamps in this design were never printed or issued.

The first revenue stamps of Seychelles were subsequently issued in 1893, when seven Internal Revenue stamps of Mauritius depicting Queen Victoria were overprinted SEYCHELLES over the original country name. Two more values were added to this set in 1894 and 1903. Between 1894 and 1902, some postage stamps of Seychelles (also depicting Queen Victoria) were also overprinted or additionally surcharged for fiscal use.

In 1904, a 30c postage stamp depicting the new monarch Edward VII was overprinted 4 cents Revenue for fiscal use. A new set depicting the king was issued in 1906. The design was based on the unissued key type of 1889–92, but depicting Edward VII instead of Victoria.

In 1915, a 4c value was issued with the same key type design but with the portrait of George V. In the 1920s, postage stamps depicting the king were locally overprinted Issued by the Stamp Office or Revenue Stamp Duty, the latter being additionally surcharged, for fiscal purposes.

Later on, regular unoverprinted postage stamps were also valid for fiscal purposes.

== Specific types ==
=== Bill of Exchange ===
Five bill stamps of Mauritius (depicting Queen Victoria) were overprinted for use in Seychelles in the 1890s. The earliest recorded use is 1896, but they might have been issued in 1893 along with the first revenue stamps. In 1897–98, provisional surcharges were made in a number of different styles on bill stamps of both Seychelles and Mauritius.

Essays for Bill of Exchange stamps depicting Edward VII were made in 1901 but were never issued.

All of the above issues were three-part stamps, inscribed FIRST, SECOND or THIRD OF EXCHANGE and printed se-tenant.

=== Passenger Service Fee ===
A 50r stamp depicting a Boeing 747 passenger jet was issued in the 1980s to pay for the Passenger Service Fee. In the late 1990s this fee was paid using passenger coupons depicting a pattern with the coat of arms of Seychelles in the background.

== Impressed duty stamps ==
Essays for a set of twelve impressed duty stamps are known dated 1904. Embossed stamp papers with five different denominations were also sent to Seychelles between 1922 and 1963. No examples of any of these have been recorded, although it is likely that they were issued and used on the islands.

A pre-printed revenue stamp was used to pay cheque duty in the late 1960s.

== See also ==
- Postage stamps and postal history of Seychelles
- Revenue stamps of Mauritius
