= Mauritius Post =

Main postal service company in Mauritius

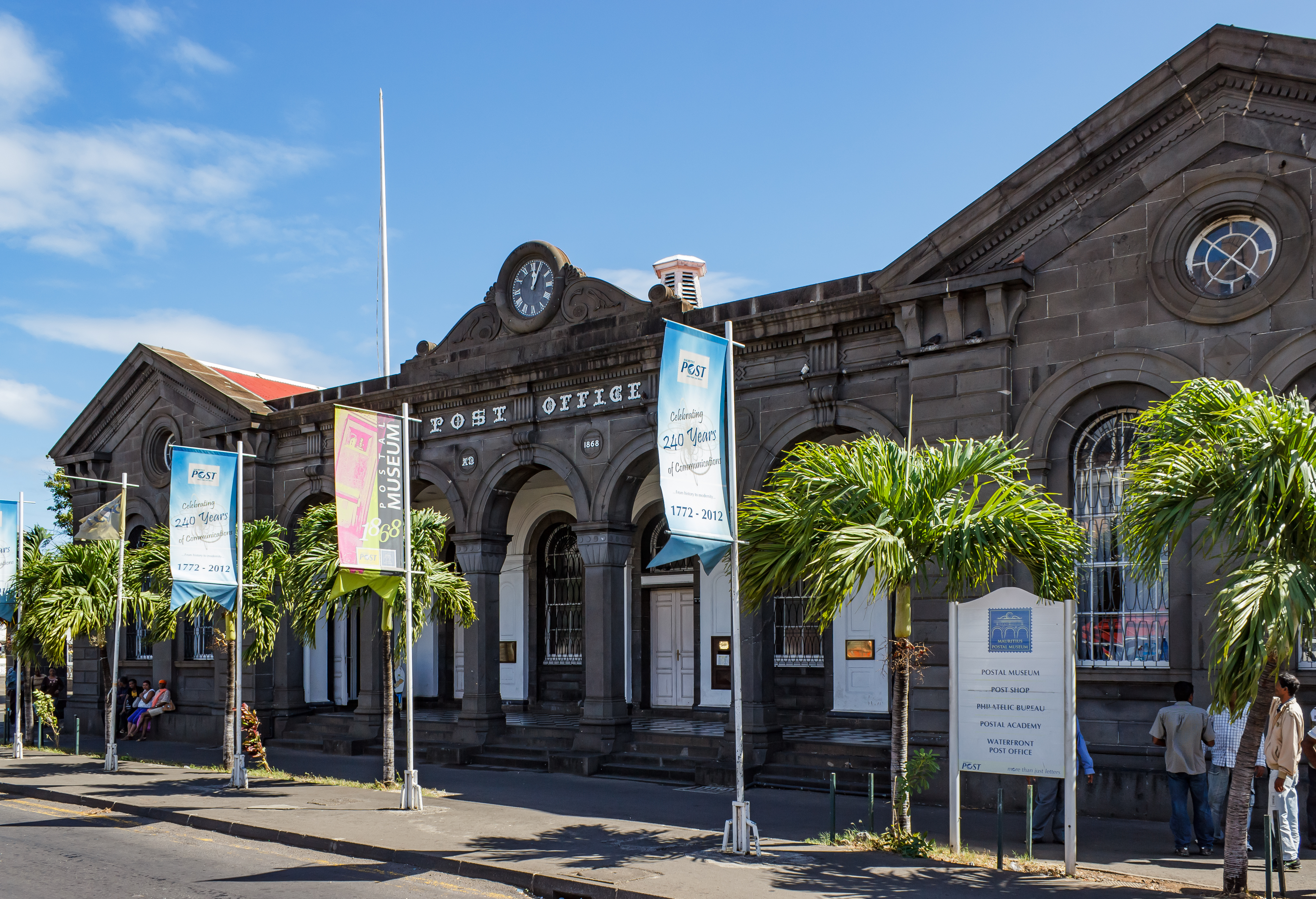
- Old Mauritius Post building in Port Louis, now part of the Mauritius Postal Museum
- Company type: Public
- Industry: Postal service
- Website: www.mauritiuspost.mu

Mauritius Post is today the company responsible for the postal service in Mauritius. The first informal mail delivery service to Mauritius from France under the direction of the French Crown appears to have been around the 1770s by Pierre Nicolas Lambert, the King’s Printer.

In 2023, the Post announced several international partnerships to upgrade and digitize their postal system.

== See also ==
- Blue Penny Museum
- Mauritius "Post Office"
- Postage stamps and postal history of Mauritius
- Postal codes in Mauritius
