= Joseph Osmond Barnard =

- Born: 10 August 1816; Portsmouth, England
- Died: 30 May 1865 (aged 48); Mauritius
- Occupation: Engraver
- Known for: Engraving Victoria on the Mauritius "Post Office" stamps

Joseph Osmond Barnard (10 August 1816 – 30 May 1865) was born in Portsmouth, England. He was a miniature painter and engraver who engraved the rare Mauritius "Post Office" stamps. He died in Mauritius on 30 May 1865.
