= List of EMS Cooperative members =

Express Mail Service (EMS) service logo

This is a list of EMS Cooperative members. Since its creation, more than 181 postal administrations have joined the EMS Cooperative, representing over 97% of global EMS traffic.

| EMS member | Operator name |
|---|---|
| Afghanistan | Afghan Shaheen Post (EMS) |
| Albania | Posta shqipatre - EMS Service |
| Algeria | Algerie Post - E.M.S Service champion-poste |
| Angola | Correios de Angola - EMS |
| Anguilla | Anguilla Postal Service - EMS |
| Antigua and Barbuda | EMS Antigua and Barbuda |
| Argentina | Correo Argentino - EMS |
| Armenia | Haypost - EMS Armenia |
| Aruba | Post Aruba - EMS |
| Australia | Australia Post – Express Courier International |
| Austria | Österreichische Post |
| Azerbaijan | EMS Azerexpresspost |
| Bahamas | Bahamas Postal Service - EMS |
| Bahrain | Bahrain Post - EMS |
| Bangladesh | Bangladesh Post - EMS |
| Barbados | Barbados Post |
| Belarus | RUE "Belpochta" - EMS Belarus |
| Belgium | Taxipost s.a. |
| Belize | Belize Postal Service |
| Benin | Benin Post |
| Bermuda | International Data Express – Bermuda |
| Bhutan | Bhutan Post Express Mail Service |
| Bosnia and Herzegovina | Public Enterprise BH Post |
| Botswana | Botswana Post – EMS |
| Brazil | Correios do Brasil |
| British Virgin Islands | EMS British Virgin Islands] |
| Brunei Darussalam | Brunei Darussalam Postal Services |
| Bulgaria | EMS / BULPOST |
| Burkina Faso | Sonopost - Burkina Faso |
| Burundi | EMS Burundi |
| Cambodia | Cambodia Post EMS |
| Cameroon | Campost EMS |
| Canada | Xpresspost – Canada Post |
| Cape Verde | Poste Du Cap Vert |
| Cayman Islands | Cayman Islands Postal Service |
| Central African Republic | Central African EMS |
| Chad | EMS-Tchad |
| Chile | Correos Chile - EMS |
| China, People's Republic | China Postal Express & Logistics |
| Colombia | EMS International |
| Comoros | Societé Nationale des Postes et des Services Financiers |
| Republic of the Congo | Congo EMS |
| Costa Rica | Correos de Costa Rica |
| Côte d'Ivoire | EMS Côte d'Ivoire |
| Croatia | Croatian Post – EMS |
| Cuba | Correos de Cuba |
| Curaçao | Cpost International N.V - EMS |
| Cyprus | EMS/Datapost Cyprus Post |
| Czech Republic | Czech Post State Enterprise - EMS |
| Democratic Republic of the Congo | EMS Congo CD |
| Denmark | Post Denmark |
| Djibouti | La Poste de Djibouti |
| Dominica | Dominica Post |
| Dominican Republic | INPOSDOM – Instituto Postal Dominicano - EMS |
| Ecuador | Ecuador EMS |
| Egypt | Egypt Post - Express Mail (EMS) |
| El Salvador | EMS El Salvador Post |
| Equatorial Guinea | Equatorial Guinea Post |
| Eritrea | EMS – Eritrean Postal Service |
| Estonia | Estonian Post Ltd - Express Mail Service |
| Ethiopia | EMS – Ethiopian Postal Service |
| Fiji | Post Fiji Ltd. |
| Finland | Posti Ltd. |
| France | La Poste - Chronopost |
| French Polynesia | EMS French Polynesia |
| Gabon | EMS Delta+ |
| Gambia | EMS Gambia |
| Georgia | Georgian International EMS |
| Germany | Deutsche Post |
| Ghana | Ghana Post |
| Gibraltar . | Royal Gibraltar Post Office |
| Greece | Tachymetaphores ELTA S.A. |
| Grenada | Grenada Postal Corporation |
| Guinea | Office de la Poste Guinéenne |
| Guyana | Guyana Postal Corporation |
| Haiti | Office des Postes d’Haiti - EMS |
| Hong Kong | Hongkong Post - Speedpost |
| Hungary | Magyar Posta Zrt. |
| Iceland | Iceland Post |
| India | India Post - EMS Speed Post |
| Indonesia | PT Pos Indonesia - EMS |
| Iran | National Post Company of the Islamic Republic of Iran |
| Ireland | An Post |
| Israel | Israel Postal Company Ltd. - EMS |
| Italy | Poste Italiane - EMS |
| Jamaica | Jamaica Post - International Express Mail (EMS) |
| Japan | Japan Post |
| Jersey | Jersey Post |
| Jordan | Jordan Post Company - EMS |
| Kazakhstan | EMS Kazpost |
| Kenya | Postal Corporation of Kenya |
| Kiribati | Kiribati Post |
| Korea, South | Korea Post EMS |
| Kuwait | Kuwait Post |
| Kyrgyzstan | Kyrgyzstan Post |
| Laos | Lao Express |
| Latvia | Latvia Post - Express |
| Lebanon | Liban Post International EMS |
| Lesotho | Lesotho Post |
| Liberia | EMS Liberia |
| Libya | Libya Post Company |
| Lithuania | Lithuania Post |
| Luxembourg | P&T Luxembourg |
| Macao | Macao Post |
| North Macedonia | North Macedonia Post EMS |
| Madagascar | EMS Mailaka |
| Malawi | EMS Malawi |
| Malaysia | EMS - Poslaju Malaysia |
| Maldives | Maldives Post |
| Mali | EMS/Mali |
| Malta | Malta Post EMS |
| Mauritania | MAURIPOST – Société Mauritanienne des Postes |
| Mauritius | Mauritius Post Ltd. |
| Mexico | Mexico EMS |
| Moldova | Poșta Moldovei - EMS |
| Mongolia | Mongol Postt |
| Montenegro | Posta Crne Gore |
| Morocco | EMS Chronopost International Maroc |
| Mozambique | EMS Mozambique |
| Myanmar | Myanmar Posts and Telecommunications |
| Namibia | NamPost EMS |
| Netherlands | PostNL B.V. |
| Nepal | General Post Office |
| New Caledonia | EMS New Caledonia |
| New Zealand | New Zealand Post Limited |
| Nicaragua | Correos de Nicaragua |
| Niger | Niger Poste |
| Nigeria | EMS/Speedpost |
| Norway | Posten Norge AS |
| Oman | EMS Oman Post |
| Pakistan | Pakistan Express Post |
| Panama | Correos de Panamá |
| Papua New Guinea | Post PNG |
| Paraguay | Correo Nacional Paraguayo - EMS |
| Peru | Serpost - Express Mail Service |
| Philippines | PHLPOST - international Express Mail Service |
| Poland | Pocztex |
| Portugal | CTT Expresso |
| Qatar | Qatar Post - Global Express (EMS) |
| Romania | Poșta Română - EMS |
| Russian Federation | EMS Russian Post – Subsidiary of FSUE Russian Post |
| Rwanda | EMS Rwanda |
| Saint Kitts and Nevis | St. Kitts & Nevis Postal Services |
| Saint Lucia | Saint Lucia Postal Service - EMS |
| Saint Vincent and the Grenadines | EMS Vinpost |
| Samoa | Samoa Post - Express Mail Service |
| Saudi Arabia | Saudi Post |
| Senegal | EMS Senegal |
| Serbia | Serbia Post |
| Seychelles | Seychelles Postal Service |
| Sierra Leone | Sierra Leone Postal Service |
| Singapore | Singapore Post Limited |
| Sint Maarten | EMS Sint Maarten |
| Slovakia | Slovenská pošta, a.s. |
| Slovenia | Pošta Slovenije, d.o.o. |
| Solomon Islands | Solomon Islands Post |
| South Africa | EMS South Africa |
| Spain | Postal Express Internacional (EMS) |
| Sri Lanka | EMS Speed Post – Sri Lanka |
| Sudan | Poste Rapide EMS |
| Suriname | Suriname Post EMS - Surpost |
| Sweden | PostNord Sverige |
| Switzerland | Swiss Post International |
| Syria | Syrian Post |
| Tanzania | EMS Tanzania |
| Thailand | Thailand Post Co., Ltd. |
| Timor Leste | EMS Timor Leste |
| Togo | EMS Togo |
| Tonga | Tonga Post- EMS |
| Trinidad and Tobago | Trinidad and Tobago Postal Corporation (TTPOSA) |
| Tunisia | Rapid-Poste Tunisia |
| Turkey | Turkey Post |
| Tuvalu | Tuvulu Post |
| Uganda | Uganda Post |
| Ukraine | Ukrposhta EMS |
| United Arab Emirates | Emirates Post - Mumtaz Post EMS |
| United Kingdom | Parcelforce |
| United States of America | United States Postal Service/EMS |
| Uruguay | Correo Uruguayo |
| Uzbekistan | EMS Uzbekistan |
| Vanuatu | Vanuatu Post - EMS |
| Venezuela | Venezuela EMS |
| Viet Nam | Vietnam Express Mail Service Company |
| Yemen | Yemen Post EMS |
| Zambia | Zampost EMS |
| Zimbabwe | EMS Zimpost |
