= La Poste =

La Poste may refer to:

- Arnac-la-Poste, a commune in France
- Jacques Laposte, a French footballer from Martinique
- La Poste Maxi Ketch, a sailing boat build for the Whitbread Round the World Race in 1993

Postal services

- La Poste (France), the postal service of France
  - Musée de La Poste, "La Poste Museum"
  - SNCF TGV La Poste, postal bullet train used by La Poste
- Algérie Poste, the postal service of Algeria
- La Poste, the French name for Belgian Post Group
- La Poste du Bénin, the postal service of Benin
- Postes Canada, the postal service of Canada
- La Poste centrafricaine, alternate name of Office national des postes et de l'épargne
- La Poste de Côte d'Ivoire, the postal service of Côte d'Ivoire
- La Poste gabonaise, the postal service of Gabon
- La Poste guinéenne, alternate name of Office de la poste guinéenne
- La Poste du Mali, alternate name of Office national des postes du Mali
- Poste Maroc, the postal service of Morocco
- La Poste Monaco, the postal service of Monaco
- Niger Poste, the postal service of Niger
- La Poste, the postal service of Senegal
- La Poste Suisse, the French name for Swiss Post
- La Poste, alternate name of Société des postes du Togo
- La Poste Tunisienne, the Tunisian postal service
- Poste Vaticane, the postal service of Vatican City

== See also ==
- Post (disambiguation)
- Poste (disambiguation)
