= Office national des postes =

Office national de postes (ONP) is French for "national post office", and may refer to:

- national postal service, see List of national postal services
- National Post Office (Rwanda) (or National Postal Corporation), or "iPosita Rwanda", of Rwanda, formerly known as the Office national des postes du Rwanda
- Office national des postes du Mali, of Mali
- Direction des services postaux de l'Office National des Postes et de l'Épargne, of Central African Republic
- Niger Poste, formerly the Office National de la Poste et de l'Épargne (ONPE), of Niger
- ONPT, formerly the Office National des Postes et Télécommunications, of Morocco
  - Poste Maroc
- Office de la poste guinéenne, of Guinea
