= Post (surname) =

Family name

Post is a surname of Low German and Dutch origin. It can be either toponymic (near a post, or marker) or occupational ("messenger; courier"). People with the name Post include:

- Achim Post (born 1959), German politician
- Albert Hermann Post (1839–1895), German jurist and judge
- Albertson Van Zo Post (1866–1938), American fencer
- Alfred Post (1926–2013), German footballer
- Alfred Charles Post (1806–1886), American surgeon
- Alfred M. Post (1847–1923), Justice of the Nebraska Supreme Court
- Alise Post (born 1991), American bicycle motocross (BMX) racer
- Arne Post (b. 1983), Norwegian winter triathlete
- Arthur Post (born 1959), American conductor
- Amy Post (1802–1889), American abolitionist and women's rights activist
- Anders Post Jacobsen (born 1985), Danish footballer
- Austin Richard Post (born 1995), American rapper known as "Post Malone"
- Bill Post (born 1950s), American radio personality and Oregon politician
- C. W. Post (1854–1914), American foods manufacturer
- Carole Post (fl. 2000s–2020s), American executive and information officer
- Caroline Lathrop Post (1824–1915), American poet
- Christian Frederick Post (1710–1785), Prussian-American Protestant missionary
- Connie Post, American poet
- Danny Post (born 1989), Dutch footballer
- David Post (born c. 1950), American legal scholar
- Dickie Post (born 1945), American football player
- Don Post (1902–1979), American latex mask manufacturer
- Ehrhardt Post (1881–1947), German chess master
- Elisabeth Post (born 1965), Dutch politician
- Elisabeth Maria Post (1755–1812), Dutch poet and author
- Elizabeth Post (1920–2010), American etiquette writer, granddaughter of Emily Post
- Elvin Post (b. 1973), Dutch author and journalist
- Emil Leon Post (1897–1954), Polish-American mathematician
- Emily Post (1872–1960), American author on etiquette
- Ethel Post-Parrish (died 1960), American Spiritualist medium
- Florian Post (born 1981), German politician
- Frank Post (born 1962), American BMX racer
- Frans Post (1612–1680), Dutch painter
- Glen Post (born 1952), American chief executive
- George Adams Post (1854–1925), Congressman from Pennsylvania
- George Booth Post (1906–1997). American watercolorist and art educator
- George Browne Post (1837–1913), American architect
- George Edward Post (1838–1909), American physician and botanist
- George Morrison Post (1883–1966), American architect
- Guy Bates Post (1875–1968), American character actor
- Hafız Post (c. 1630 – 1694), Turkish composer and musician
- Harry C. Post (1868–1961), American educator, founder of Post University
- Hendrik Houwens Post (1904–1986), Dutch philologist
- Henry Post (1885–1914), American aviation pioneer
- Howard Post (1926–2010), American animator and comic artist
- Isaac Post (1798–1872), American abolitionist and women's rights activist
- Jacob Post (1774–1855), English Quaker and a religious writer
- James D. Post (1863–1921), U.S. Representative from Ohio
- James E. Post (born c. 1950), American business scholar
- Jayden Post (born 1989), Australian rules footballer
- Jermaine Post (born 1992), Dutch racing cyclist
- Jim Post (1939–2022), American folk musician
- Johannes Post (1906–1944), Dutch Resistance member
- John Post (1936–2020), American philosopher
- Joop Post (born 1950), Dutch businessman and politician
- Joseph Post (1906–1972), Australian conductor and music administrator
- Jotham Post, Jr. (1771–1817), U.S. Representative from New York
- Julia Post (born 1989), German politician
- Juliët Post (born 1997), Dutch cricketer
- Keanau Post (born 1992), Canadian basketball player
- Laura Post (born c. 1985), American voice actress
- Leslee Milam Post, Arkansas politician
- Lorenzo L. Post (1821–?), Wisconsin politician
- Louise Post (born 1966), American rock singer and guitarist
- Louis Freeland Post (1849–1928), prominent Georgist and Assistant United States Secretary of Labor
- Lyman Post (1863–1933), American publisher and editor
- Madison Post (1815–1867), American mayor of Tampa, Florida
- Marion Post (1910–1990), American photographer
- Marjorie Merriweather Post (1887–1973), American socialite and founder of General Foods, Inc.
- Mark Post (born 1957), Dutch pharmacologist
- Markie Post (1950–2021), American actress
- Marten Post (born 1942), Dutch visual artist
- Mary Post (1841–1934), American education pioneer
- Maurice Post (fl. 1906), American college football coach
- Maurice E. Post (1881–1958), Michigan politician
- Maurits Post (1645–1677), Dutch architect
- Melville Davisson Post (1871–1930), American mystery author
- Meredith Post, American television writer
- Mike Post (born 1944), American composer and music producer
- Mike Post (born 1944), British airline pilot, pension campaigner
- Mikey Post (born c. 1990), American actor
- Morton Everel Post (1840–1933), American politician
- Nathan Post (1881–1938), 7th and 10th Governor of American Samoa
- Peggy Post (born 1945), American etiquette writer
- Peter Post (1933–2011), Dutch cyclist and directeur sportif
- Philip S. Post (1833–1895), American diplomat, politician, and Army officer
- Pieter Post (1608–1669), Dutch architect, painter and printmaker
- Randy Post (born 1968), American illustrator
- Regis Henri Post (1870–1944), New York politician and Governor of Puerto Rico
- Reuben Post (1792–1858), American Presbyterian clergyman
- Richard F. Post (1918–2015), American physicist
- Robert Post (born 1979), Norwegian singer/songwriter
- Robert C. Post (born 1947), American law professor
- Robert P. Post (1910–1943), American war correspondent
- Sam Post (1896–1971), American baseball player
- Sander Post (born 1984), Estonian footballer
- Sandra Post (born 1948), Canadian golfer
- Saskia Post (born 1961), American-born Australian actress
- Seraphim Post (1904–1975), American football player
- Siim-Markus Post (born 1997), Estonian basketball player
- Soraya Post (born 1956), Swedish politician
- Stephen Post (1810–1879), American Latter Day Saint leader
- Stephen G. Post (born 1951), American ethicist
- Steve Post (1944–2014), American freeform radio artist
- Sue-Ann Post (born 1964), Australian comedian and writer
- Suzy Post (1933–2019), American civil rights activist
- Ted Post (1918–2013), American television and film director
- Troy Victor Post (1906–1998), American insurance executive
- Wally Post (1929–1982), Major League Baseball outfielder
- Walter A. Post (died 1912), first mayor of Newport News, Virginia
- Wiley Post (1898–1935), American aviator; first pilot to fly solo around the world
- William Post (disambiguation), several people
- Wright Post (1766–1828), American surgeon

Van der Post

- Laurens van der Post (1906–1996), South African author

Von Post

- Gunilla von Post (1932–2011), Swedish aristocrat and Kennedy friend
- Hampus von Post (1822–1911), Swedish geologist and agricultural scientist
- Lennart von Post (1884–1951), Swedish naturalist and geologist
- Vicken von Post Totten (1886–1950), Swedish ceramicist, sculptor, painter, and illustrator

== See also ==
- Post (disambiguation)
- Poste (disambiguation)
