= List of companies of Burkina Faso =

Location of Burkina Faso (in dark blue)

Burkina Faso, also known by its short-form name Burkina, is a landlocked country in West Africa around 274,200 square kilometres (105,900 sq mi) in size. Burkina Faso is part of the West African Monetary and Economic Union (UMEOA) and has thus adopted the CFA Franc, which is issued by the Central Bank of the West African States (BCEAO), situated in Dakar, Senegal. There is mining of copper, iron, manganese, gold, cassiterite (tin ore), and phosphates.

== Notable firms ==
This list includes notable companies with primary headquarters located in the country. The industry and sector follow the Industry Classification Benchmark taxonomy. Organizations which have ceased operations are included and noted as defunct.

Notable companies Status: P=Private, S=State; A=Active, D=Defunct
Name	Industry	Sector	Headquarters	Founded	Notes	Status	
Air Burkina	Consumer services	Airlines	Ouagadougou	1967	National airline	P	A
Naganagani	Consumer services	Airlines	Ouagadougou	1984	Defunct state airline	P	D
Sahelis Productions	Consumer services	Broadcasting & entertainment	Ouagadougou	1992	Film and television	P	A
Société Nationale d'électricité du Burkina Faso	Utilities	Conventional electricity	Ouagadougou	1995	Electrical utility	P	A
SONAPOST	Industrials	Delivery services	Ouagadougou	1987	Postal services	P	A
Tovio	Consumer goods	Clothing & accessories	Ouagadougou	1994	Sportswear and equipment	P	A

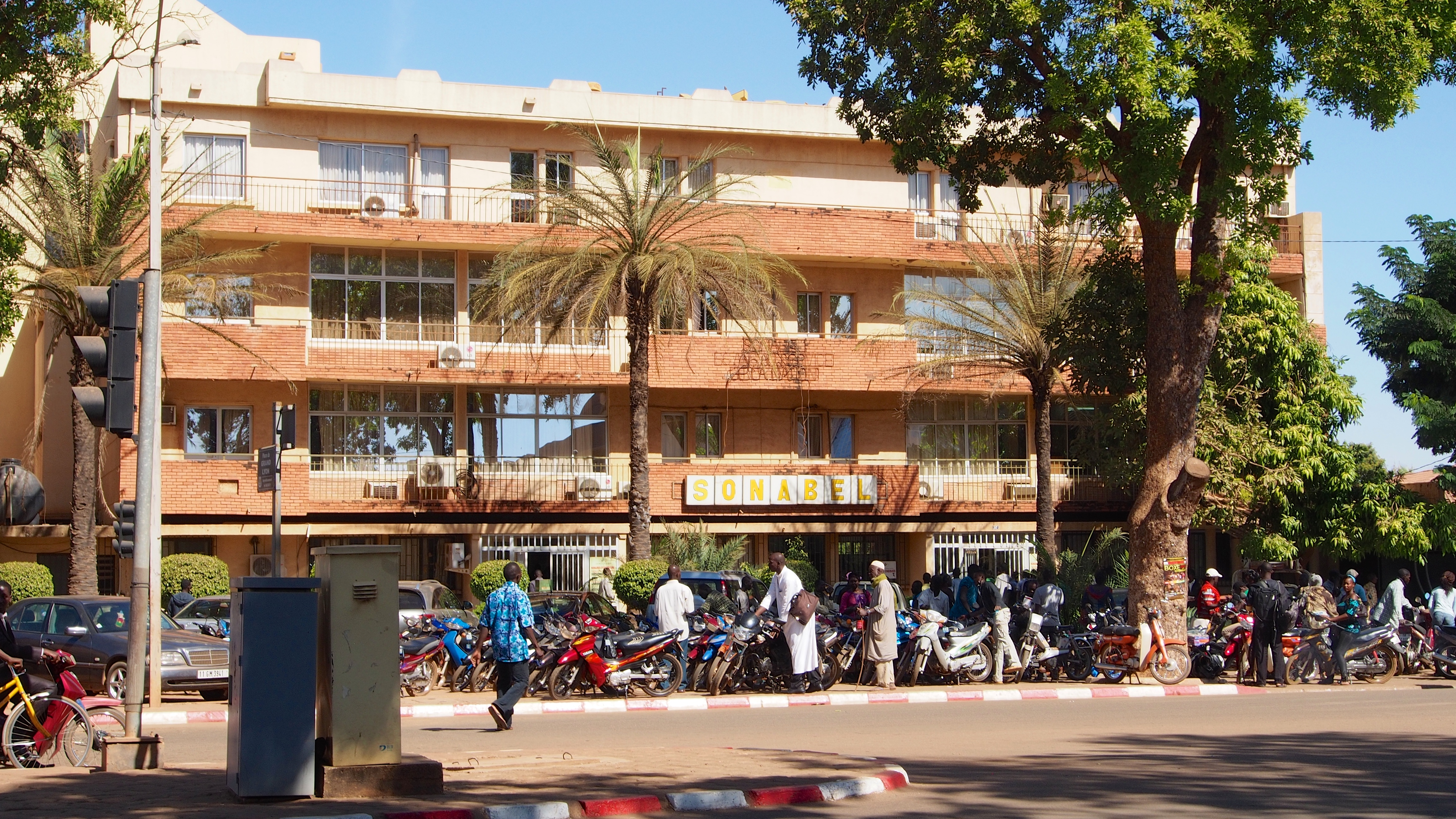
Société Nationale d'électricité du Burkina Faso headquarters in Ouagadougou

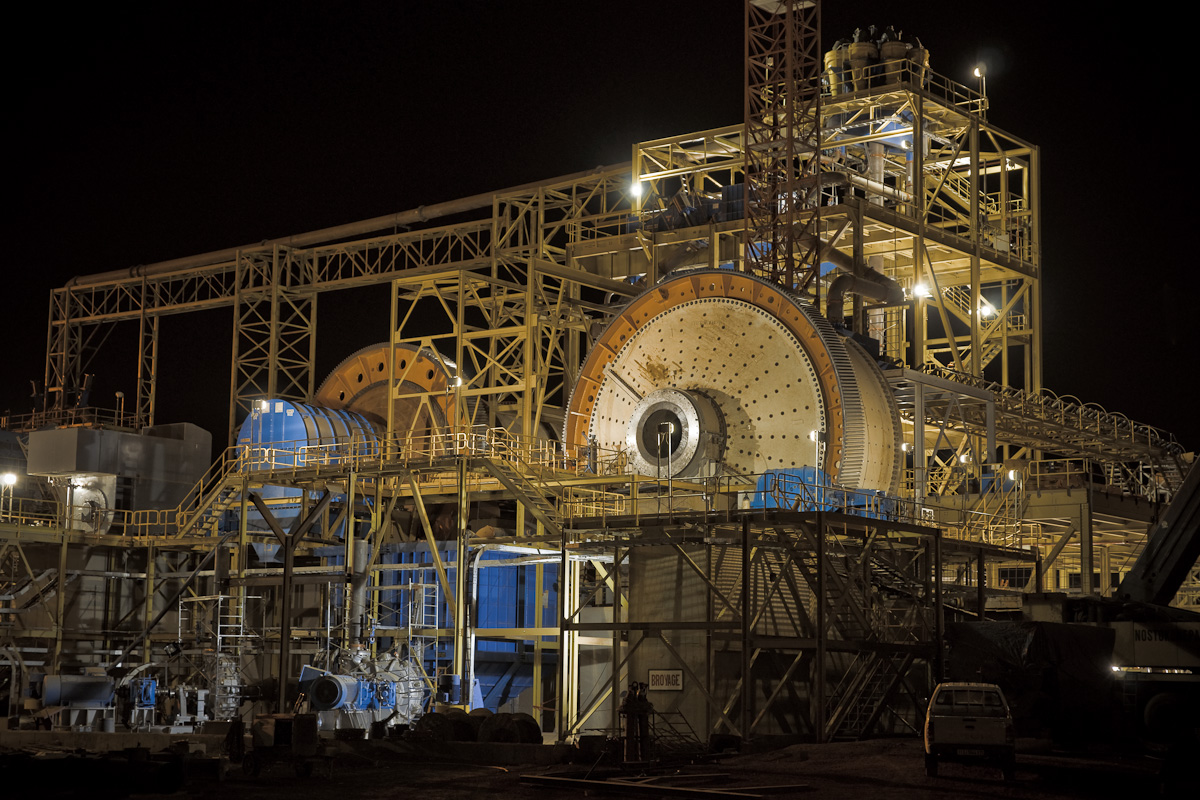
Processing facilities at the Essakane Mine.

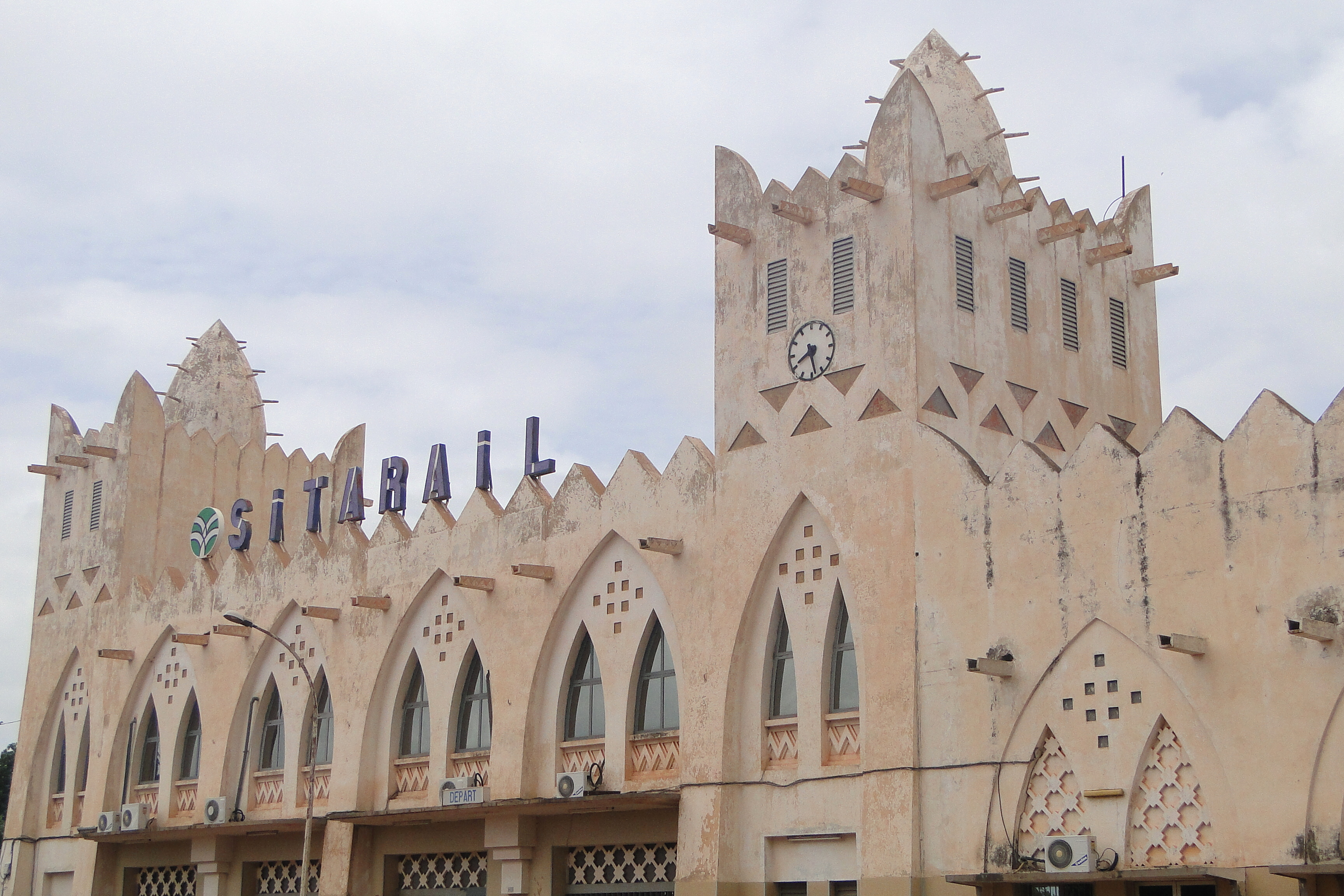
The Bobo Dioulasso railway station, built during the colonial era.

== See also ==
- Economy of Burkina Faso
- Trade unions in Burkina Faso
- List of airlines of Burkina Faso
- List of banks in Burkina Faso
