= List of defunct airlines of Burkina Faso =

This is a list of defunct airlines of Burkina Faso.

Airline	Image	IATA	ICAO	Callsign	Commenced operations	Ceased operations	Notes
Air Continental					1999	2003	
Air Volta		VH	VHW	VICTORIA HOTEL	1967	1985	Renamed to Air Burkina
Burkina Airlines		3B	BFR	BURKLINES	2003	2006	Some wet-leased from Eagle Aviation, France when needed
Faso Airways		F3	FSW	FASO	2000	2009	
Multi Air Services					2000	2000	
Naganagani Compagnie Nationale			BFN		1984	1992	
PointAir Burkina			PAW		2005	2006	Operated Boeing 707
T Air					1984	1984	Renamed to Naganagani Compagnie Nationale
Transafricaine SA			TNF		2007	2008	Cargo operator

== See also ==
- List of airlines of Burkina Faso
- List of airports in Burkina Faso
