= Posts =

Posts may refer to:

- Post (disambiguation)
- Posts, California
