= West African Postal Conference =

Forum for postal services in West African countries

- Conférence des Postes des États de l'Afrique de l'Ouest
- Formation: 2012
- Type: Postal

The West African Postal Conference, or Conférence des Postes des États de l'Afrique de l'Ouest, was formed in 2012 as a forum for postal services in West African countries.

The members are:

- Benin
- Burkina Faso
- Ghana
- Côte d'Ivoire
- Mali
- Niger
- Nigeria
- Senegal
- Togo
