= List of banks in Burkina Faso =

This is a list of commercial banks in Burkina Faso, as updated in September 2024 by the Banking Commission of the West African Monetary Union.

== List of commercial banks ==
- Bank of Africa - Burkina Faso (BOA-Burkina), part of the Bank of Africa Group
- Banque Agricole Du Faso (BADF)
- Banque Atlantique Burkina Faso, part of the BCP Group
- Banque Commerciale du Burkina (BCB), a joint venture between the Burkinese government and the Libyan Foreign Bank
- Banque De l'Union - Burkina Faso (BDU-BF), owned by Banque de Développement du Mali
- Banque Postale du Burkina Faso (BPBF), owned by La Poste Burkina Faso
- Banque Sahélo-Saharienne pour l'Investissement et le Commerce (BSIC-Burkina Faso), part of the BSIC Group
- Coris Bank International, part of the Coris Bank Group
- Ecobank Burkina, part of the Ecobank Group
- International Business Bank Burkina (IB Bank Burkina), part of IB Bank Group
- Société Générale - Burkina Faso, part of the Société Générale Group
- United Bank for Africa Burkina (UBA-Burkina), part of UBA Group
- Vista Bank Burkina (former BICIAB), part of Vista Bank Group
- Wendkuni Bank International (WBI)
- Branch of CBAO Groupe Attijariwafa Bank
- Branch of Orabank

== See also ==
- Central Bank of West African States
- Economy of Burkina Faso
- List of companies based in Burkina Faso
- List of banks in Africa
