= Poste =

Poste may refer to:

- Poste Airport, (ICAO: FEFB, IATA: MKI), airport in Central African Republic
- Poste Point, a pointe in an Antarctica
- Paray-Vieille-Poste, a commune in France

Postal services

- La Poste (disambiguation), several postal services named "La Poste" (aka "Poste")
- Poste italiane, the Italian postal service
- Poste Maroc, Moroccan postal service
- Poste sammarinesi, the San Marino post bureau
- Pošte Srpske, Bosnian-Serb postal service
- Poste Vaticane, the Vatican post office
- Gabon Poste, Gabonese postal service
- Niger Poste, Nigerien postal service
- Postes Canada, Canadian postal services

People

- Beale Poste (1793–1871), Anglican cleric
- Gary Francis Poste (1937–2018), Zodiac Killer suspect
- Leslie I. Poste (1918–1996), librarian
- George Poste, English-American doctor

== See also ==
- La Poste (disambiguation)
- Post (disambiguation)
