= Stamps issued in support of Ukraine =

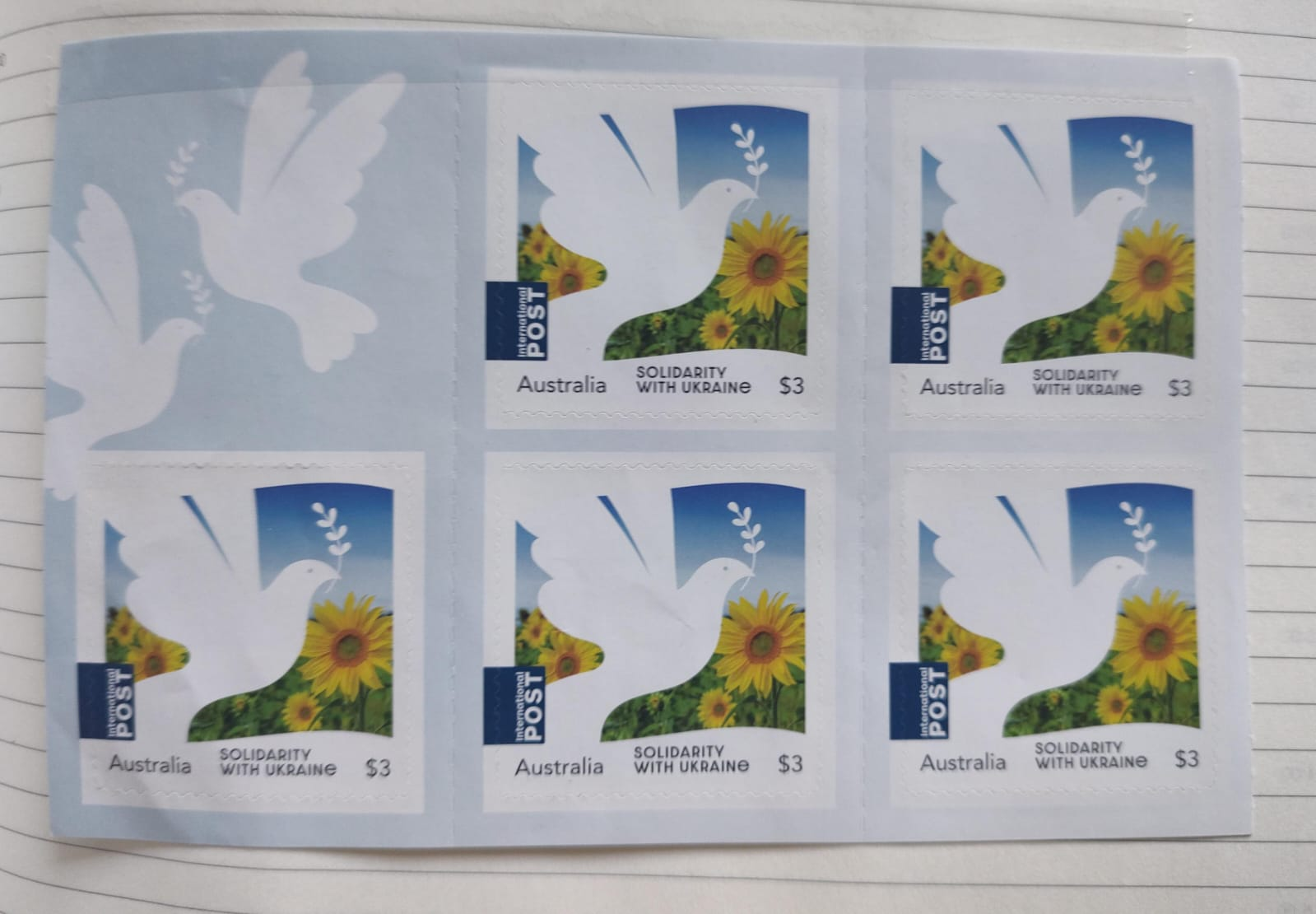
A postage stamp issued by Australia in support of Ukraine in August 2024

Since 24 February 2022, following the start of the Russian invasion of Ukraine, many countries have issued postage stamps in support of Ukraine, some of which were charity stamps. In May 2022, Forbes magazine estimated that at least 44 such stamps had been issued, with a total print run that could have exceeded 4 million copies and a total value of US$2 million, of which US$1 million was to be allocated to support Ukraine.

On 5 April 2023, Ukrposhta opened the philatelic exhibition 'Solidarity with Ukraine' at the Kyiv Central Post Office, featuring stamps from 15 postal operators around the world that had been issued supporting Ukraine following the start of Russia’s full-scale aggression. The opening of the exhibition was attended by Yevhen Perebyinis, Deputy Minister of Foreign Affairs of Ukraine, as well as ambassadors and representatives of the diplomatic corps from Latvia, Estonia, Poland, Austria, Croatia, the Czech Republic, Spain, Lithuania, France, Canada, Slovakia and Portugal, and the heads of the Lithuanian and Latvian postal services. At the exhibition opening, Ihor Smilianskyi, Director General of Ukrposhta, noted that this was the first time in history that foreign stamps, rather than Ukrainian ones, had been presented at the main post office, and from as many as 15 countries at once.

In August 2024, this exhibition opened at the National and University Library in Zagreb, with the support of Ukrposhta, Croatian Post (Hrvatska pošta) and the Croatian Ministry of Foreign and European Affairs.

The issue of stamps supporting Ukraine by many postal operators in other countries has become one of the few such examples in world history.

== List ==
- On 10 March 2022, Latvia became the first country in the world to issue a set of stamps and a special envelope supporting Ukraine.
- On 24 March 2022, Estonia issued a stamp bearing the slogan ‘Glory to Ukraine!’ supporting Ukraine.
- On 25 March 2022, Poczta Polska (Polish Post) issued a postage stamp and envelope entitled We’re with you!'
- On 31 March 2022, Austria issued a stamp supporting Ukraine.
- On 12 April 2022, Croatia issued a stamp supporting Ukraine.
- On 19 April 2022, the Moldovan Post issued a stamp supporting Ukraine (Poșta Moldovei).
- On 6 May 2022, Lithuanian Post (Lietuvos paštas) issued a postage stamp entitled 'Ukrainos laisvės gynėjams' ('Defenders of Ukrainian Freedom'). The stamp’s design was selected following a special competition organised by Lithuanian Post. The competition was won by designer Eglė Kirlitė from the creative agency 'Autoriai'. The stamp was printed in a run of 40,000 copies, with half of the proceeds from its sale going towards aid for Ukraine.
- On 9 May 2022, the Czech Republic issued a stamp supporting Ukraine (Česká pošta).
- On 11 May 2022, Post Luxembourg (Post Luxembourg) issued two personalized "Peace" stamps of identical design but different denominations, supporting Ukraine. The €25,000 raised from the sale of the stamps was donated to a charitable organization that helped refugees from Ukraine.
- On 19 May 2022, Canada Post (Canada Post) put into circulation a postage stamp with an additional "Aid for Ukraine" surcharge, based on an image of a sunflower, which is one of Ukraine's national plant symbols. For the first time in its history, Canada issued a postage stamp supporting another country in need of humanitarian aid.
- On 30 May 2022, the Spanish Post (Correos) issued a "Spain with Ukraine" postage stamp supporting Ukraine.
- On 23 June 2022, the French Post (La Poste) presented the charitable postal issue "United in the Ukrainian Crisis" during the Paris Philex philatelic exhibition.
- On 16 September 2022, the Slovak Post (Slovenská Pošta) presented the "Solidarity with Ukraine" postage stamp.
- On 27 September 2022, the Portuguese Post (Correios de Portugal) presented a stamp of solidarity with Ukraine. The postage stamp bears the inscriptions in Portuguese and Ukrainian "Solidários com o Povo Ucraniano" — "In Solidarity with the Ukrainian People" The Portuguese Post directed the proceeds from the sale of these stamps toward the reconstruction of a psychological rehabilitation center in Borodianka.
- On 7 November 2022, the Italian Post (Poste Italiane) presented the postal issue "Profughi dell'Ucraina" ("Refugees from Ukraine"), thus expressing its support for Ukrainian refugees.
- On 27 July 2023, the Italian Post issued four more charitable stamps supporting Ukraine, with the proceeds from their sale directed toward humanitarian support for Ukraine:
  - "Churches of Kyiv" (artist — Kateryna Lypovka);
  - "Mariupol Theatre" (artist — Serhii Smetankin);
  - "Lviv Square" (artist — Yurii Bandera);
  - "Odesa Port" (artist — Sviatoslav Skorobohatov).
- The stamps were issued at the initiative of the Italian Minister of Economic Development Adolfo Urso following an art competition.
- On 11 September 2023, the French Post issued another postage stamp "Conseil de l'Europe — Unis pour l'Ukraine", which depicts street art supporting Ukraine by the renowned French artist Christian Guémy (C215), created by him on one of the buildings in Paris.
- On 22 September 2024, a stamp supporting Ukraine was issued by Australia Post (Australia Post). The stamp, depicting a dove of peace and sunflowers, was presented by the Ambassador of Ukraine to Australia Vasyl Myroshnychenko and the Managing Director of Australia Post Paul Graham.
- In addition, during 2022–2023, Sierra Leone issued many stamps supporting Ukraine, including the "Volodymyr Zelenskyy" stamps, "Glory to Ukraine", "Pope Francis prays for Ukraine", as well as the series: "Firefighter Heroes of Ukraine", "Celebrities for Ukraine", "Colonel Oksanchenko", "Military Aircraft of Ukraine". However, for this country it is rather a way to make money, since Sierra Leone is known as a country that issues stamps specifically for the collectors' market.
- In 2022, stamps supporting Ukraine were also issued by the post of the Central African Republic, including one featuring the sunken Russian cruiser "Moskva" though, as in the case of Sierra Leone, this was rather a way to profit from a popular topic.
