= Léopoldine Doualla-Bell Smith =

Léopoldine Doualla-Bell Smith was the world's first black flight attendant. She was born in Cameroon, and was a princess of the royal Douala family of Cameroon. She took her first flight as a flight attendant (with Union Aéromaritime de Transport) in 1957. In 1960 she was invited to move to Air Afrique; she was then the only qualified African person in French aviation, and thus became the first employee hired by Air Afrique. She shortly became Air Afrique's first cabin chief. She flew for twelve years. She was honored at the 40th anniversary celebration of the Black Flight Attendants of America at Los Angeles International Airport's Flight Path Museum. She was honored during the international women day celebration in Denver Colorado on March 10, 2019
