= List of airlines of Burkina Faso =

\ This is a list of airlines that have an air operator's certificate issued by the Agence Nationale de l'Aviation Civile of Burkina Faso.

Airline	IATA	ICAO	Callsign	Hub airport(s)	Image	Commenced operations	Notes
Air Burkina	2J	VBW	BURKINA	Ouagadougou Airport		1985	
Colombe Airlines		CBL		Ouagadougou Airport		2012	Formed in 6/12 by Groupe Tigahiré. Started operations on 5/10/13. Suspended operations in 2017 ?
Liz Aviation	L0	LAZ	LIZAIR	Ouagadougou Airport		2023	https://africaaero.org/en/burkina-faso-launch-of-the-activities-of-the-new-airline-liz-aviation-sa-of-ebomaf/

== See also ==
- List of defunct airlines of Burkina Faso
- List of airlines
- List of companies based in Burkina Faso
