= Postage stamps and postal history of Benin =

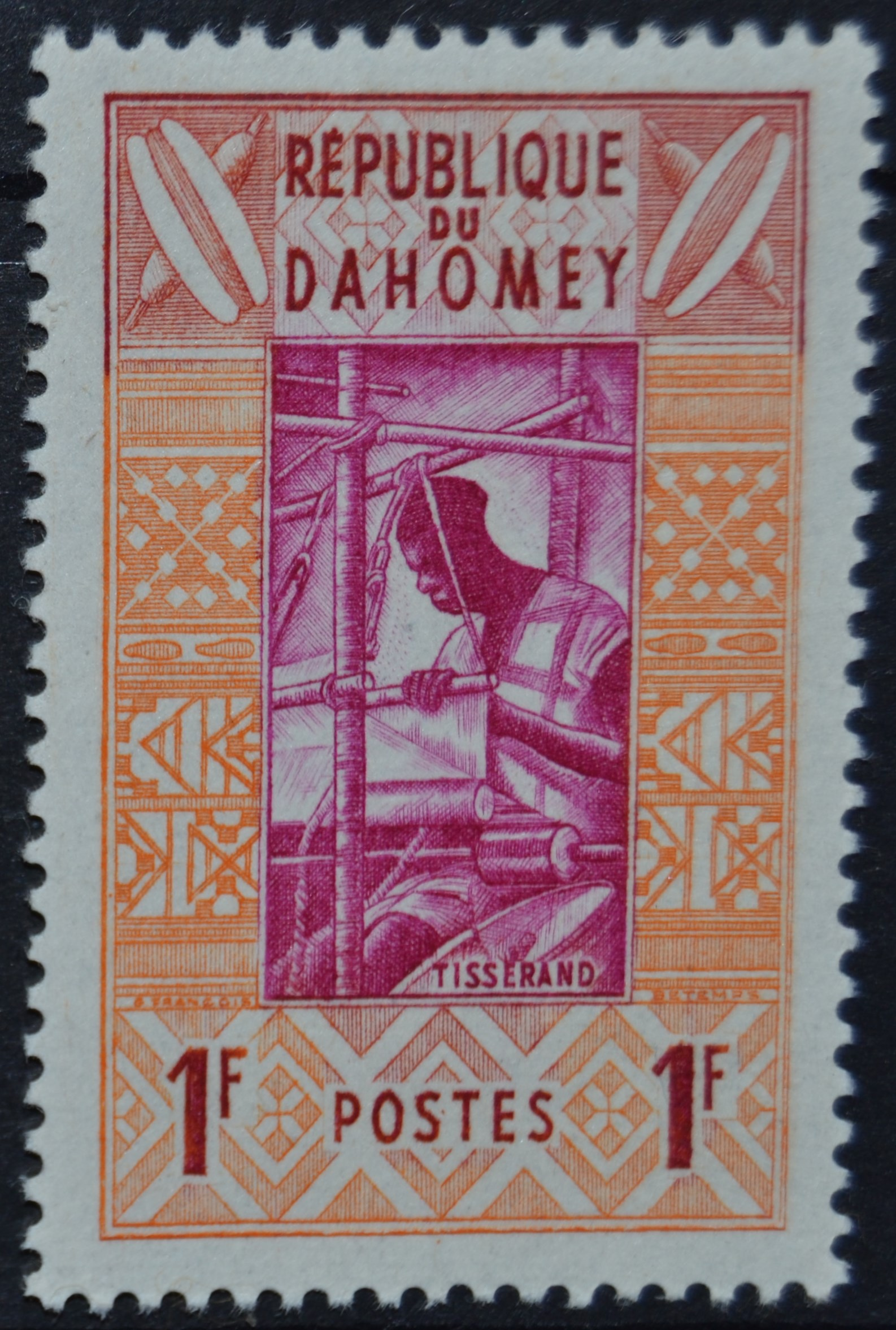
1961 stamp of the Republic of Dahomey

This is a survey of the postage stamps and postal history of Benin, formerly Dahomey.

Located in West Africa, Benin borders Togo to the west, Nigeria to the east and Burkina Faso and Niger to the north; its short coastline to the south leads to the Bight of Benin. Benin is just over 110000 km^{2} in size with a population of almost 8,500,000. Its capital is the city of Porto-Novo but the seat of government is the city of Cotonou.

== French colony ==
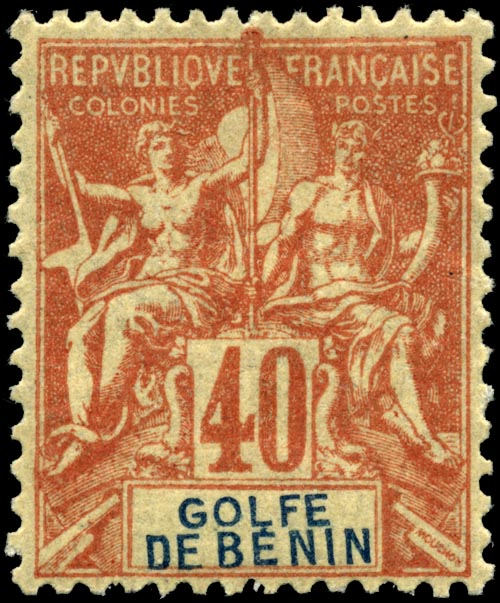
1893 French colonial stamp for use in Les établissements du golfe de Bénin

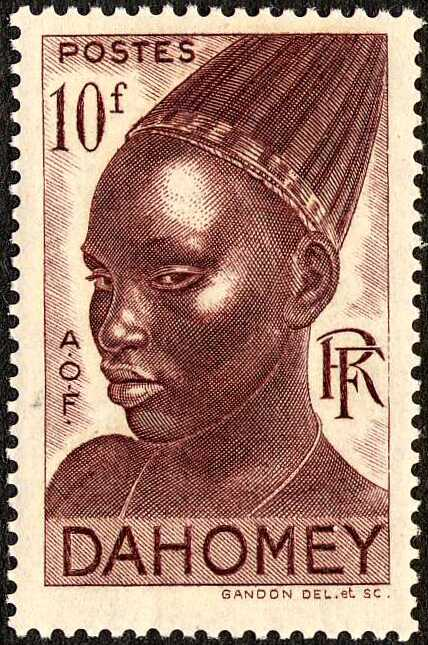
1940 stamp of French Dahomey

Benin's first stamps were French colonial stamps used at Porto Novo from 1888. Stamps were issued in 1892 for French colonies on the coast of the Bight of Benin called the Établissments du Golfe de Benin.

In 1904, the colony of French Dahomey was established, as part of French West Africa. Stamps inscribed Dahomey were issued between 1899 and 1942. Stamps of French West Africa were then used until 1960.

== Independence ==
The colony became the self-governing Republic of Dahomey, and two years later on 1 August 1960, it gained full independence. Stamps inscribed Dahomey were issued again in 1960.

In 1975, the country was renamed Benin.

== See also ==
- La Poste du Bénin
- Postage stamps of French West Africa
