= Post =

Post, POST, or posting may refer to:

== Postal services ==
- Mail, the postal system, especially in Commonwealth of Nations countries
  - An Post, the Irish national postal service
  - Canada Post, Canadian postal service
  - Deutsche Post, German postal service
  - Iraqi Post, Iraqi postal service
  - Russian Post, Russian postal service
  - Hotel post, a service formerly offered by remote Swiss hotels for the carriage of mail to the nearest official post office
  - United States Postal Service or USPS
  - Parcel post, a postal service for mail that is heavier than ordinary letters

== Work ==
- Post, a job or occupation

== Newspaper ==
- The Manica Post Regional newspaper in Manicaland province, Zimbabwe
- The Rakyat Post Malaysian online daily newspaper
- Bangkok Post English language newspaper in Thailand

== Architecture and structures ==
- Lamppost, a raised source of light on the edge of a road
- Post (structural), timber framing
- Post and lintel, a building system
- Scratch post
- Steel fence post
- Trading post
- Utility pole or utility post

== Military ==
- Military base, an assigned station or a guard post
  - Outpost (military), a military outpost
  - Guardpost, or guardhouse

== Geography ==
- Post, Iran, a village in West Azerbaijan Province of Iran
- Post, Oregon, a community at the geographic center of the U.S. state of Oregon
- Post, Texas, the county seat of Garza County, Texas, United States

== People ==
- Post (surname)
- Post Malone, musician
- C.W. Post, founder of Post Cereal
- Emil Leon Post, American mathematician and logician
- George Edward Post, American botanist

== Dentistry ==
- Post and core, a type of dental restoration

== Organology ==
- Key post, a mechanical fixed part of woodwind keywork system

== Arts, entertainment, and media ==
=== Albums ===
- Post (Björk album), her second solo studio album, released in 1995
- Post (Paul Kelly album), his first solo studio album, released in 1985
- Post-, a 2018 album by Jeff Rosenstock

=== Periodicals ===
- Australasian Post, a defunct Australian weekly magazine
- Post Magazine, a British magazine first published in 1840
- The Post (disambiguation), a list of newspapers
- The Saturday Evening Post, an American magazine

=== Other uses in media ===
- Post, an alternative name for a hanger (barbershop music)
- Post Records, a record label
- Post, a prominent musical change during the intro of a recording, as used in the production of radio programming
- Post-production

== Communications ==
- Post, an entry in a blog or an Internet forum; see posting style
- Part-of-speech tagging or POST, the process of marking up a word in a text (corpus) as corresponding to a particular part of speech
- Physician Orders and Scope of Treatment or POST, in Tennessee, similar to POLST Physician Orders for Life-Sustaining Treatment
- Postscript, a sentence, paragraph, or longer text addended to a main document, such as a letter

== Computing and technology ==
- POST (HTTP), an HTTP request method
- .post, the internet top-level domain
- Power-on self-test or POST, start-up routines on electronic devices, typically on computers

== Education and training ==
- LIU Post, one of the two campuses of Long Island University in the U.S. state of New York, formerly known as C.W. Post.
- Peace Officer Standards and Training or POST, state-level training program for American law-enforcement officers
- Post University, a university in the U.S. state of Connecticut

== Organizations and companies ==
- Parliamentary Office of Science and Technology or POST, in the United Kingdom
- Peninsula Open Space Trust, a land trust in California
- Post Holdings, a consumer packaged goods holding company
  - Post Cereals, a packaged food subsidiary of Post Holdings

== Sports ==
- Post (basketball), area near the basket in basketball
- Post (route), route run by a receiver in American football
- Posting system, transfer system for professional baseball players moving from a Japanese team to a Major League Baseball team
- Post, a method of horseback riding at the trot
- Post, a shortened name of goalpost usually used in American football.

== Time ==
The prefix "post" means after, aftermath, or afterward, e.g.,

- post-acute, see AMDA – The Society for Post-Acute and Long-Term Care Medicine
- Jus post bellum, "morality after war"
- Postbellum, a period after a war
- Post mortem, an autopsy or recap
- Post-World War II, the period following World War II

== See also ==
- Hitching post (disambiguation)
- La Poste (disambiguation)
- Pole (disambiguation)
- Poste (disambiguation)
- Old Post (disambiguation)
- Posthaste, a 2012 album by the band OHMphrey
- Posting (laundering process), or postadh, a traditional Scottish method of washing clothes
