= Air Afrique =

African airline (1961–2002)

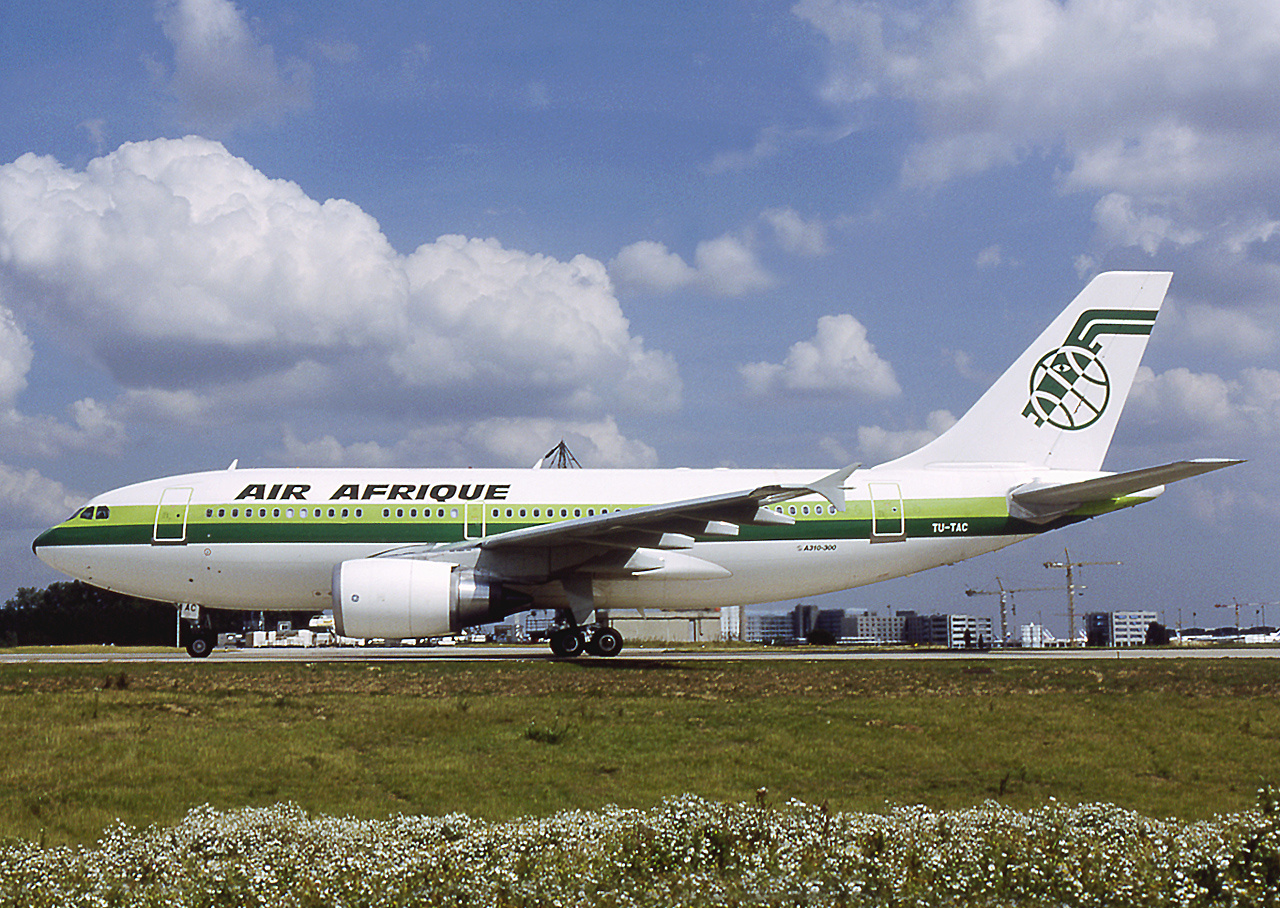
IATA	ICAO	Call sign
RK	RKA	AIRAFRIC
- Founded: 28 March 1961
- Commenced operations: 1 August 1961
- Ceased operations: January 2002
- Hubs: Abidjan
- Secondary hubs: Dakar–Yoff
- Subsidiaries: Air Burkina; Air Mali; Air Mauritanie
- Destinations: 22 (at the time of closure)
- Headquarters: Abidjan, Ivory Coast
- Key people: Saleh Ahmet Mahamet (Chairman of the Board) (at the time of closure)
- Website: airafrique.com (currently unavailable)

Air Afrique was a Pan-African airline, that was mainly owned by many West African countries for most of its history. It was established as the official transnational carrier for francophone West and Central Africa, because many of these countries did not have the capability to create and maintain a national airline, and had its headquarters in Abidjan, Ivory Coast. The carrier was a member of the International Air Transport Association (IATA) as well as the French Union's smaller IATA-like ATAF.

Air Afrique began a steady decline in the early 1980s, yet many years later the company was still considered the most reputable carrier in West Africa, and even one of the top five airlines of Africa. Mismanagement, corruption, and the downturn in the aviation industry after the 11 September 2001 attacks led the airline to a crisis that ended with its liquidation in early 2002. Even though there were plans to revive the airline with the creation of a new company, they never materialised, as it was succeeded by short-lived Afrinat International Airlines.

== History ==
=== The early years ===
Air Afrique was originally conceived in February 1960 as a joint subsidiary of Air France and Union Aéromaritime de Transport (UAT) to take over the regional services these airlines had operated in Africa. The new company was registered in September 1960 as Air Afrique (Société de Transports Aériens en Afrique). During the first conference of Francophone countries that was held in Abidjan in October 1960, the Ivorian president Felix Houphouët Boigny recommended the constitution of a multinational airline for these countries. Eleven heads of state that attended to the next conference, held at Brazzaville in December the same year, agreed to form the company. Gambia, Ghana and Mali decided to stay away from the project, as they had plans for setting up their own airlines with aid from the Soviets. The formation of the company took place during the third conference, held at Yaoundé in early 1961: Air Afrique (Société de Transports Aériens en Afrique) changed its name to Société pour le Développement du Transport Aérien en Afrique (SODETRAF); the eleven countries and SODETRAF would set up the new airline. The Treaty of Yaoundé, signed on 28 March 1961, founded Air Afrique as a joint venture between Air France and UAT, each of which had a 17% holding, while the eleven newly independent former French colonies in West Africa, namely Benin, Burkina Faso, Cameroon, Central African Republic, Chad, Côte d'Ivoire, Gabon, Mauritania, Niger, the Republic of the Congo and Senegal, contributed with the remaining 66% of the capital, estimated in 500 millions of CFA francs. Léopoldine Doualla-Bell Smith, a flight attendant, was invited to move to Air Afrique in 1960; she was then the only qualified African person in French aviation, and thus became the first employee hired by Air Afrique.

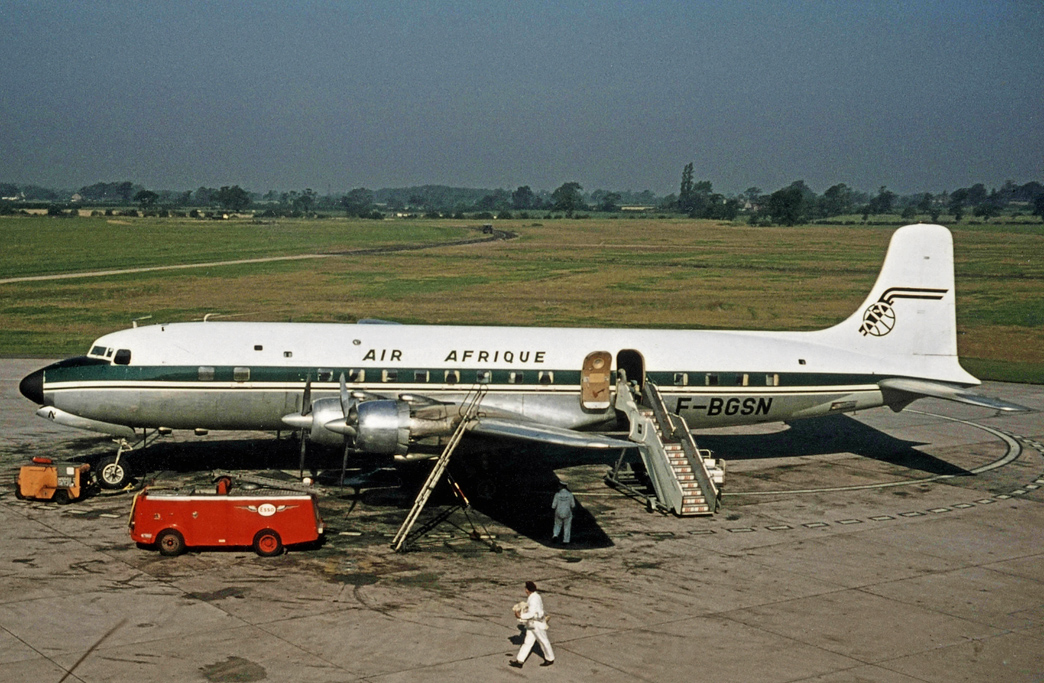
Air Afrique Douglas DC-6B at Manchester Airport in 1963

Cheikh Fall was appointed as the first CEO of the company on 25 June 1961. It started operations on 1 August 1961 serving internal routes with 12 leased DC-4s from Air France and UAT. On 15 October 1961, an Air France Lockheed Constellation that flew the Paris–Port Etienne–Dakar–Abidjan–Cotonou–Douala route on behalf of the company inaugurated the long-haul operations. Pressurised Douglas DC-6 aircraft were added to the fleet in the early 1960s, also leased from UAT. On 5 January 1962, the carrier deployed Boeing 707s, leased from Air France, on the Paris–Dakar–Abidjan and the Paris–Douala–Brazzaville runs; these were the first jet aircraft introduced on the carrier's intercontinental routes. Two DC-8s were the first jets ordered by the airline in December the same year. Also in 1962, the carrier became a member of the International Air Transport Association.

Air Afrique founder/shareholder countries
Country	From	To
Benin	1961	2002
Burkina Faso	1961	2002
Cameroon	1961	1971
Central African Republic	1961	2002
Chad	1961	2002
Ivory Coast	1961	2002
Gabon	1961	1976 (Note: The year for the withdrawal of Gabon was also informed to be 1977.)
Mali	?	2002
Mauritania	1961	2002
Niger	1961	2002
Republic of the Congo	1961	2002
Senegal	1961	2002
Sierra Leone	1978	?
Togo	1965	2002

In January 1963, Cheikh Fall was appointed general manager of the company. Union de Transports Aériens (UTA) was formed in October 1963 from the merger of UAT and Transports Aériens Intercontinentaux (TAI). Following this, Air Afrique ownership was reorganised, with SODETRAF acquiring a 28% stake and the balance being held by the member states. (Note: SODETRAF was 75%-owned by UTA, while the remaining stake was held by Air France; this resulted in SODETRAF acquiring a 28% stake in the airline under a 15-year agreement, whereas the remaining 72% was held by the member states.) The first DC-8 was delivered in October 1963, and entered service a month later; the second aircraft of the type was handed over in January the next year, being deployed on the route to Marseille late that month. Air Afrique became the owner of its entire fleet in November 1963, following an agreement with UTA. Also in 1963, Hajj flights, carrying pilgrims to Mecca, commenced using the Starliner aircraft. In April 1964, Air Afrique was authorised to connect several African countries with the United States and in November, the Paris–Abidjan run started calling at Geneva on a weekly basis.

By April 1965, Air Afrique had 2,500 employees. At this time, there were two DC-8-50s in service, along with three DC-4s and four DC-6s. That month, the route to Paris, already stopping at Dakar and Geneva, began calling at Robertsfield. A month later, Air Afrique passengers started flying to the United States allocated on Pan Am flights. Also in 1965, the company ordered two Caravelles; a third DC-8, a convertible (DC-8F) one that would be used to increase cargo capacity, was ordered in July. In 1966, the DC-8F entered the fleet and the carrier started withdrawing the DC-6s from service. Togo became the 12th state in joining the consortium in 1965, but it was not until 1968 that this country held a participation in the carrier. By the mid-1960s, the carrier took over the Air France and UTA maintenance facilities located at Dakar-Yoff Airport. There, the company carried out the maintenance for its aircraft (excluding the jet fleet) and also undertook maintenance works for foreign carriers, including Air Mauritanie and Air Senegal, and even for air forces of neighbour countries. Another maintenance centre was located at Douala Airport. However, major maintenance works were provided by UAT at Le Bourget Airport.

Air Afrique received two Caravelle 11Rs, a mixed passenger-cargo version of the Caravelle 10R, in September 1967. Two DC-4s were sold at the time in order for the company to afford the costs of these new aircraft. The Caravelles were deployed on African routes, replacing the DC-6s. In 1968, another DC-8-50 joined the fleet. By then, the route network included 22 African countries, along with Bordeaux, Lyon, Marseille, Nice and Paris in France, Geneva in Switzerland and New York in the United States (in agreement with Pan Am).

=== The 1970s ===
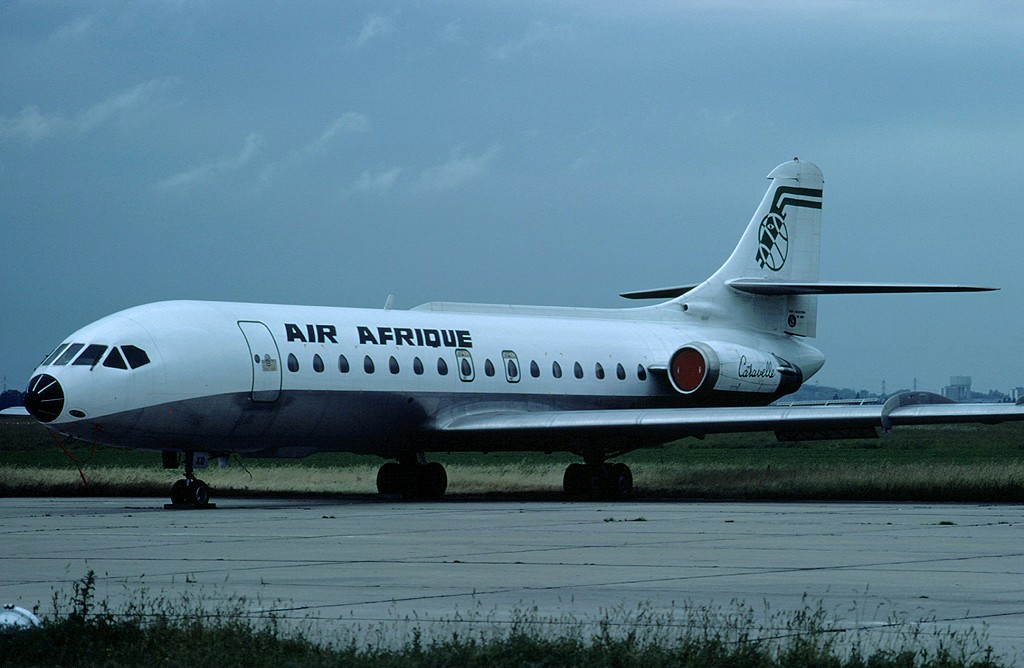
An Air Afrique Caravelle standing at Le Bourget Airport in 1977. A third aircraft of the type was delivered in 1971.

The company ordered two McDonnell Douglas DC-10-30s in February 1970, boosting the order with one more aircraft of the type the same year. Amid increasing tourism in Africa, in March the same year the airline acquired a 51% stake in Société de Développement Hôtelier & Touristique en Afrique d l'Ouest; Air Afrique also held interests in tourist agencies. At April the same year, the number of employees was 3,370 and the aircraft park stood at three DC-8s, one DC-8F, two Caravelle 11Rs, one DC-3 and four DC-4s. In December 1970, a DC-8-63CF entered the fleet and two NAMC YS-11As were purchased; these turboprop airliners were transferred to Air Ivoire in 1972. Air Afrique started flights to New York in its own right in January 1971, using DC-8-63 aircraft. In August the same year, Central African Republic's president Jean Bedel Bokassa stated that his country would leave the consortium to form their own airline, Air Centrafrique; the withdrawal plans were shelved. Shortly afterwards, Cameroon's president Ahmadou Ahidjo was discontented with the airline both for the lack of Cameroonians in top management positions and for the location of the head office in Abidjan, as Douala was the city with the highest traffic among the points served by the carrier in Africa at the time, and Ahidjo believed the head office should be located there. In September, Cameroon withdrew its support from the consortium to run their own national carrier, Cameroon Airlines, which had been founded on 26 July 1971. Ownership was reorganised following the Cameroon breakaway, with the remaining shareholder countries participating with 6.18% each and SODETRAF keeping a 28%.

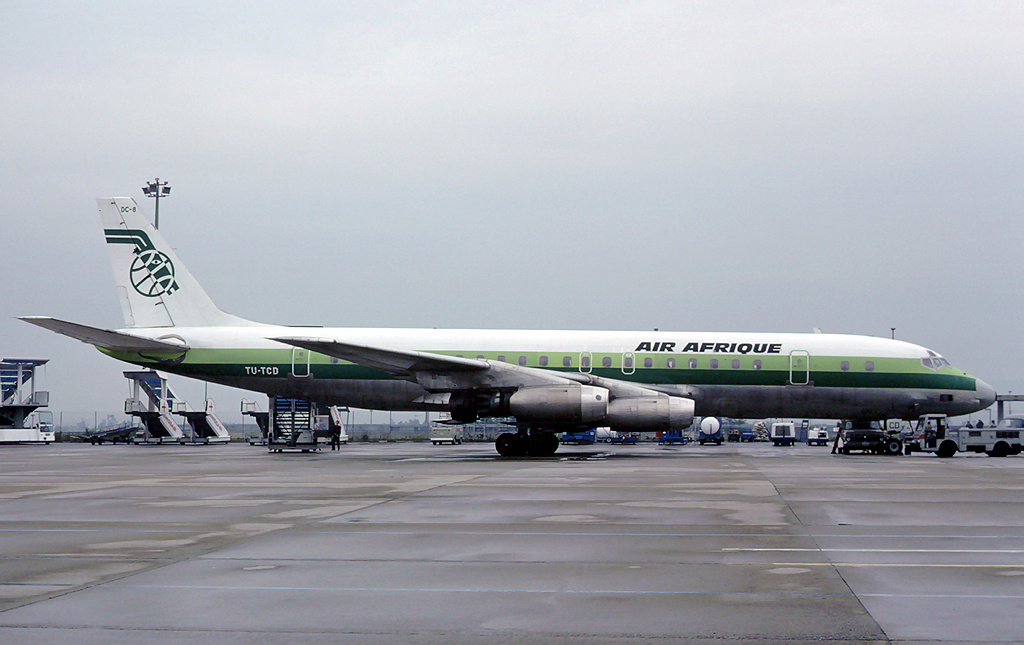
A Douglas DC-8-30 at Euroairport in 1978. The DC-8 entered the fleet in 1963.

During 1971, a third Caravelle was incorporated into the fleet, and the regional headquarters for Central Africa were moved from Douala, Cameroon to Libreville in Gabon. The move angered Chadian president François Tombalbaye, who also threatened to withdraw support to the multinational enterprise in 1972, something that finally did not occur. The carrier joined the Air France reservation system in 1973. The first wide-bodied DC-10-30, named ″Libreville″, was delivered on 28 February 1973, arriving in Dakar on 2 March. Starting 13 March, the type replaced the DC-8s on the Paris–Bordeaux–Nouakchott–Dakar, Paris–Dakar–Abidjan, Paris–Fort Lamy–Bangui–Brazzaville, Paris–Marseille–Niamey–Cotonou–Abidjan routes in a gradual manner. Late in 1973, a fourth Caravelle was acquired from Royal Jordanian Airlines and a Douglas DC-8-55F entered the fleet. Cheikh Fall was succeeded by Aoussou Koffi at the head of the company in 1974.

At March 1975, the workforce had grown to 3,726 and the carrier's fleet comprised three Caravelles (one 10R and two 11Rs), one DC-3, five DC-8s (one DC-8-63CF, one DC-8-30 and three DC-8-50s) and a DC-10-30. In August, a third DC-8-55F was purchased. The second DC-10-30, ″Cotonou″, joined the fleet in 1976; prior to incorporation, the aircraft had been delivered in June 1975 and leased to Thai Airways International. In 1976, Gabon left the consortium and formed Air Gabon; Sierra Leone was incorporated in 1978. A third DC-10-30 was ordered in 1977 and a Boeing 747-200C in 1978. In 1979, the company placed an order with Airbus for one Airbus A300B4, intended to fly the Dakar–Paris route, and two Airbus A310s; the order was later homogenised to include three A300B4s. A Boeing 747F was also ordered that year.

=== The 1980s ===
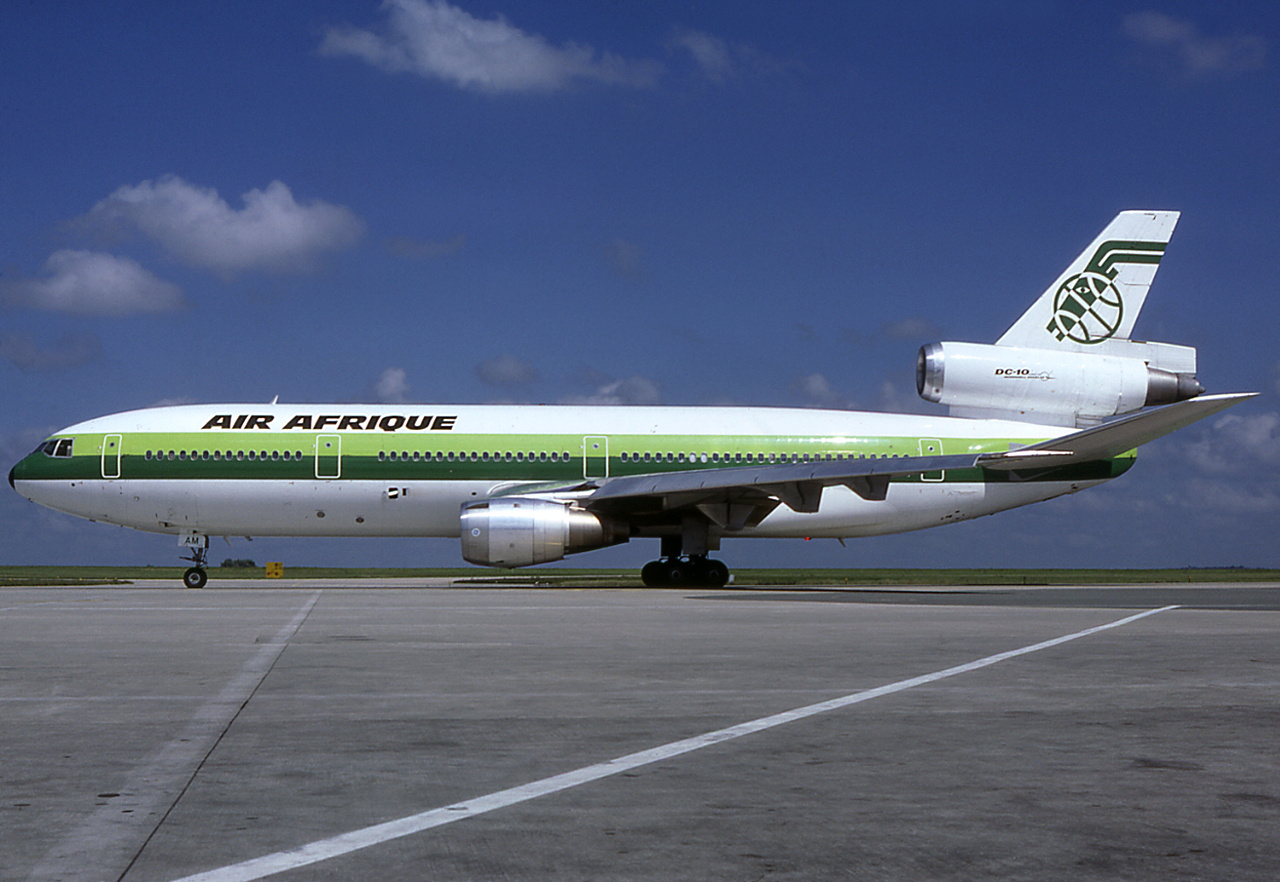
A McDonnell Douglas DC-10-30 at Paris-Charles de Gaulle Airport in 1980. The airline received the first aircraft of the type in 1973. With registration TU-TAM and named ″Cotonou″, this particular aircraft was the second DC-10-30 the company received, in 1976.

In July 1980 the airline had 5,100 employees and a fleet that comprised a pair of Caravelle 10Rs, three DC-8-50s, two DC-8-50Fs, one DC-8-63 and three DC-10-30s that served 22 African nations and intercontinental routes to Bordeaux, Geneva, Lyon, Marseille, Nice, New York, Paris, Rome and Zürich. Three aircraft (an Airbus A300B4, an Airbus A310 and a Boeing 747-200F) were on order. A DC-8-55F was sold in 1981 ahead of the incorporation of new aircraft; that year, three Airbus A300s, a Boeing 747-200C and the third DC-10-30 named Niamey joined the fleet. The airline had to sell three Caravelles and two DC-8-63s to counter the financial difficulties that arose from the decline of passengers carried in 1983. On 1 March 1984, a Boeing 747-200F was leased to National Airlines, which in turn sub-leased the aircraft to Saudi Arabian Airlines. Business class was introduced on most of the aircraft during 1984.

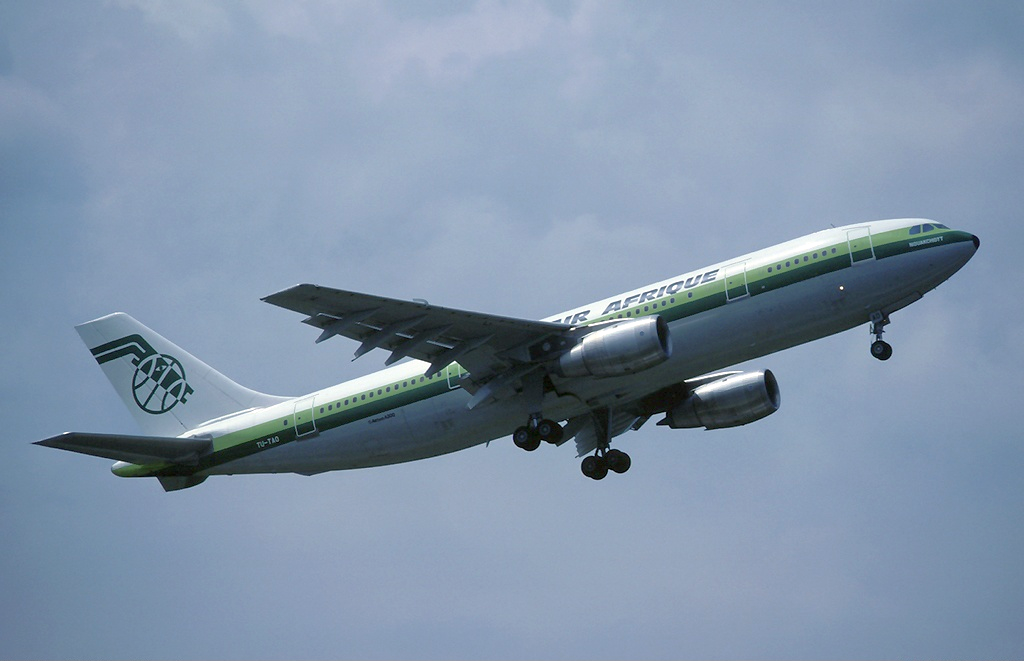
An Air Afrique Airbus A300B4-200, 1982. The type was first ordered in 1979.

The carrier began a steep decline during the decade, just after the ″Africanisation″ of the airline, i.e. Africans holding all top positions, was completed. Since that time, overbooked flights became frequent, tickets reserved for the member states were never paid, and schedules were missed to such an extent that some flights arrived half a day later or even departed ahead of schedule without any explanation. Losses mounted to FRF 68 million and FRF 6,8 million for 1983 and 1984, respectively; by contrast, the carrier made an FRF 17.6 million (US$2.47 million) profit during 1985. The number of passengers carried that year was 757,000, a 9.5% increase from the previous year. Largely due to the acquisition of new aircraft or wet-leasing planes from other companies, at early 1985 the carrier had a total debt of US$250 million, with approximately a fifth of this amount being unpaid contributions from the member states. Director-general Koffi Aoussou also attributed the losses to the rise in fuel prices (Air Afrique spent US$35 million in fuel in 1978 and almost US$63 million in 1984), to overstaffing, to the increase in competition (mainly from UTA in the European routes), and to poor performance of the member countries' economies.

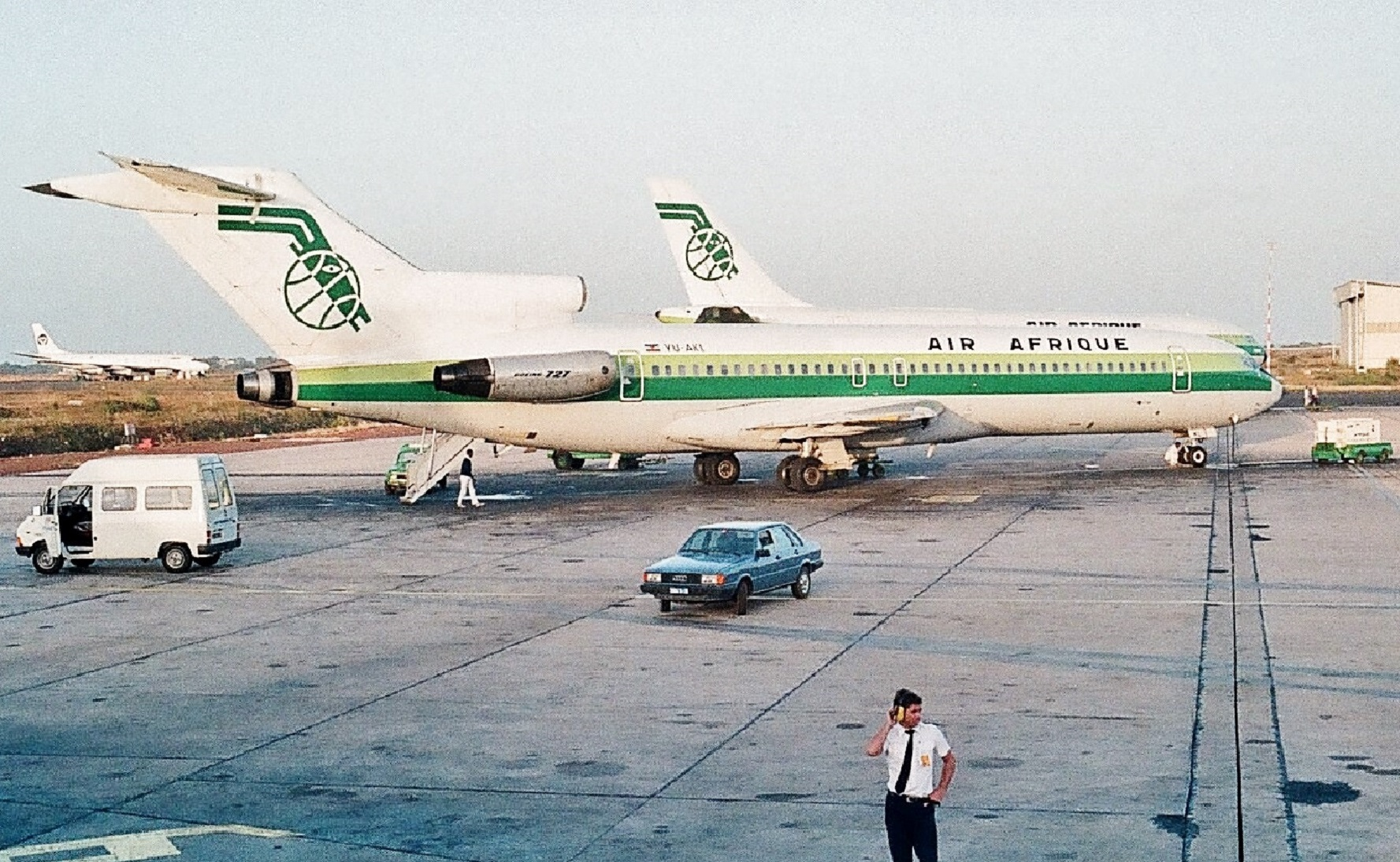
A Boeing B727-200, leased from JAT, at Dakar-Yoff Airport in 1984

During 1985, Auxence Ickonga former head of the Congolese state-owned oil company Hydrocongo, succeeded Ivorian Aoussou Koffi as president and director general of the airline with plans to reduce salaries, shrink the 5,600-strong staff by 515, and to sell a Boeing 747 for US$60 million in order to make the company economically viable. By July 1986, the debt-to-equity ratio was 8:1, with obligations rising to FRF 1,800 million. At the same time, the fleet comprised three A300s, two Boeing 727s (one chartered from Air France and the other from JAT), two DC-8s and three DC-10s; the Boeing 747 cargo that Ickonga intended to sell to alleviate the financial crisis was acquired by Korean Air Lines for US$60 million.

By the late 1980s, Air Afrique had accumulated debts for over 200 billion CFA francs. The consortium members (Benin, Burkina Faso, Central African Republic, Chad, Congo, Ivory Coast, Mauritania, Niger, Senegal and Togo) sought assistance from France. On 2 March 1989, Rolland Billecart —a high-ranking official of the French government— entered the company, becoming the first non-African chairman and CEO of Air Afrique with plans to keep the company afloat that included the reduction of the workforce by 2,000. The company carried 710,498 passengers in 1988 and recorded an FRF 288 million net loss for the year, whereas an FRF 7.3 million (US$1.3 million) net profit was posted the following year, with 754,314 passengers carried. The workforce was cut by 1,600 in June 1989. The new management lobbied to restrict foreign airlines to serve the member countries in order for Air Afrique to take advantage of this situation. Agadez was made part of the route network in the fall of 1989. For a short period of time starting in late 1989, a 302-seater Lockheed L-1011, a 137-seater Boeing 737 and a Boeing 707 Freighter were leased from American Trans Air, Aeromaritime and Naganagani, respectively, in order to supplement the fleet.

=== The 1990s ===
At March 1990 the fleet consisted of three Airbus A300B4, one McDonnell Douglas DC-8-63F and three DC-10-30. In mid-1990, an order was placed with Airbus for four Airbus A310-300s plus four more options, with deliveries starting in mid-1992. In 1990 Air France became UTA's controlling shareholder. This resulted in UTA's stake in Air Afrique passing into Air France's hands.

The first Airbus A310-304 entered the fleet in 1991. In 1994 the fleet comprised 12 aircraft and the carrier had more than 4,200 employees. Cash position dramatically worsened that year after a 50% devaluation of the CFA franc, a situation that led to the seizure of one fourth of the fleet, due to debt defaults, in the forthcoming years. Subsequently, the already indebted company had to lease in order to revert the lack of aircraft. It nevertheless suspended, or reduced the frequency on some routes, and codeshared others. During 1995, the airline transported 761,000 passengers, losing US$19,000,000 (equivalent to $40,145,228 in 2025). Also in 1995, DHL started participating into the airline. One DC-10-30 was sold to AOM French Airlines in February 1996.

Billecart left Air Afrique in 1997 and was succeeded by Sir Harry Tirvangadum, a Mauritian national, as Director General. Billecart's management was plagued of accusations. He claimed he failed to restructure the company due to the excessive interference from the governments that owned it, whereas employees accused him of worsening Air Afrique's financial position by acquiring four Airbus A310-300s. Tirvangadum reduced the debts to just 31 billion CFA francs. From all the member states, only Côte d'Ivoire, Mali and Senegal provided their quota from a total of 20 billion CFA francs that were necessary to alleviate the financial difficulties of the carrier at that time. During Tirvangandum's mandate, Air Afrique entered a partnership with the World Bank, which aimed operations to be restricted to Africa. In July 1998, the carrier reduced its fleet from 15 to 11 when four Airbus A310-300s were returned to the creditors. Late that year, debts rose to about US$300,000,000 (equivalent to $592,588,812 in 2025). By that time, eleven countries on the CFA zone were the major shareholders of the airline (70.4%), African and French investors had a participation of 13.7%, Air France had a 12.2% stake, and DHL owned 3.2%.

=== The final years ===
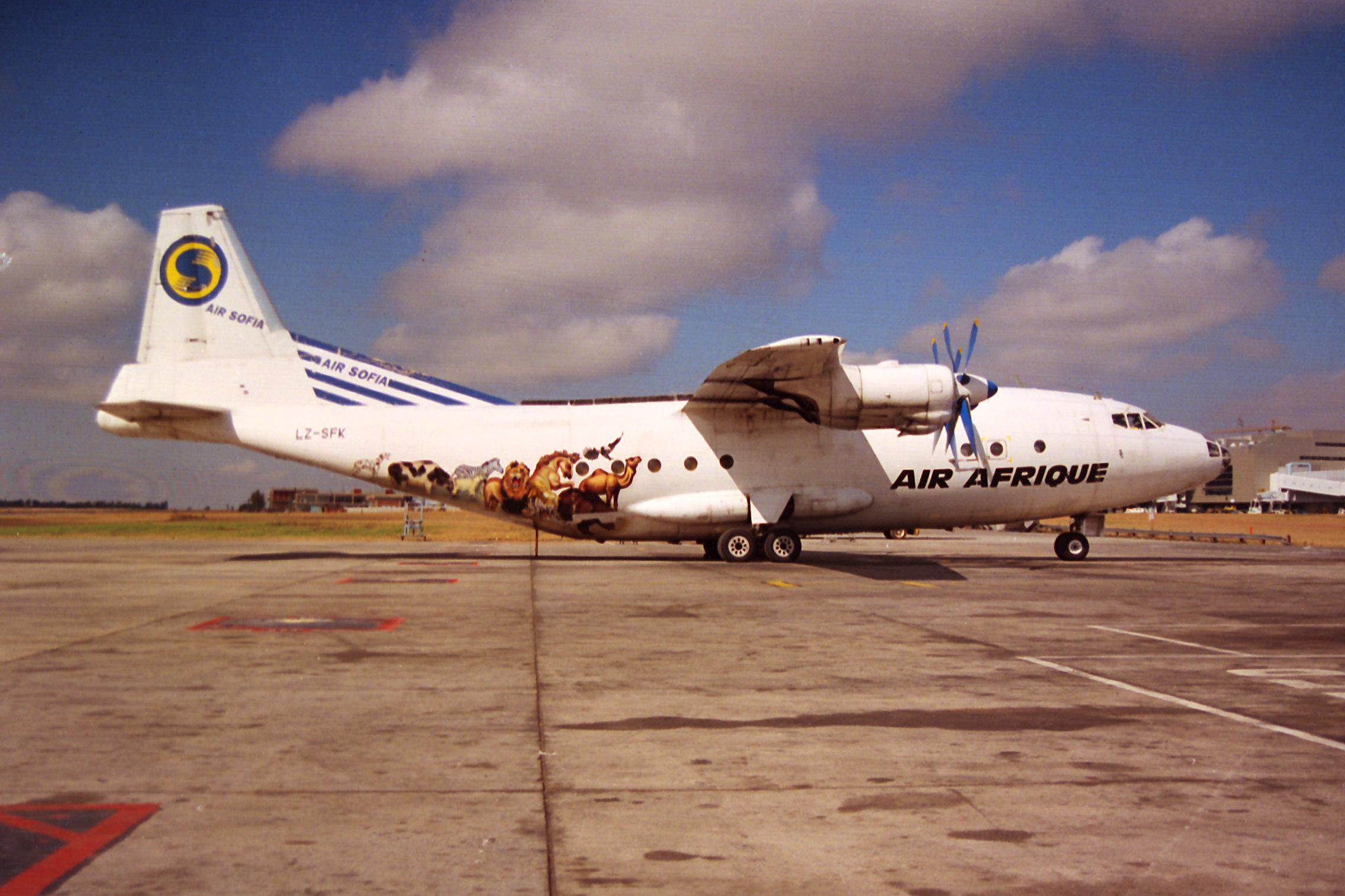
An Air Afrique An-12 wearing a hybrid Air Afrique/Air Sofia livery.

At April 2000, the carrier had 4,440 employees, the fleet comprised one Antonov An-12, two Airbus A300-600Rs, three Airbus A300B4-200s, two Airbus A310-300s, two Boeing 707-320Cs, five Boeing 737-300s and a Boeing 767-300ER, whereas two Airbus A330-200s were on order. At the same time, the route network included Abidjan, Abu Dhabi, Accra, Athens, Bamako, Bangui, Banjul, Beirut, Bissau, Bordeaux, Brazzaville, Casablanca, Conakry, Cotonou, Dakar, Douala, Geneva, Jeddah, Johannesburg, Lagos, Libreville, Lisbon, Lomé, Malabo, Marseille, Monrovia, Nairobi, N'Djamena, New York, Niamey, Nouakchott, Ouagadougou, Paris, Pointe-Noire, Rome and Zürich. In January 2001, Jeffrey Erickson, former CEO of Trans World Airlines, attempted to re-structure the heavily indebted carrier, backed by both a consultancy and a World Bank grant, setting up a 14-month privatization plan. At that time schedules were commonly missed as the airline was suffering a lack of aircraft. By June 2001, Air Afrique still ranked among the top five African airlines alongside EgyptAir, Kenya Airways, Royal Air Maroc and South African Airways but debts had risen to US$431,000,000 (equivalent to $783,673,182 in 2025). Later that year, the airline appealed to the French carrier Air France –still a minor shareholder in Air Afrique– for negotiation capacity. Air France became the major shareholder of the company when its holding was raised to 35% after a cash injection. The eleven African Governments reduced its participation in Air Afrique to 22%, 5% belonged to the employees, and the remaining stake were owned by other investors. The plan Air France had in mind was to close down Air Afrique and set up a new airline using the same name. Despite this, Air Afrique went out of business in January 2002, in the wake of the downturn in the aviation industry created by the 2001-09-11 attacks, and was never revived. Less than a year earlier the company had about 4,600 employees to service a fleet of just six planes; at the time of closure, it had one leased operative aircraft, and partly owned Air Burkina (17%), Air Mali (11.5%) and Air Mauritanie (32%). The carrier was declared bankrupt on 7 February 2002. Air France took over most of Air Afrique routes.

== Destinations ==
At its peak of operation, the airline operated an extensive network within Central and Western Africa, as well as flights to Europe and North America. The scheduled network at the time of closure comprised 22 destinations: Abidjan, Athens, Bamako, Bangui, Banjul, Brazzaville, Casablanca, Cotonou, Dakar, Douala, Geneva, Libreville, Lomé, Marseille, N'Djamena, New York, Niamey, Nouakchott, Ouagadougou, Paris, Pointe-Noire, and Rome.

== Fleet ==
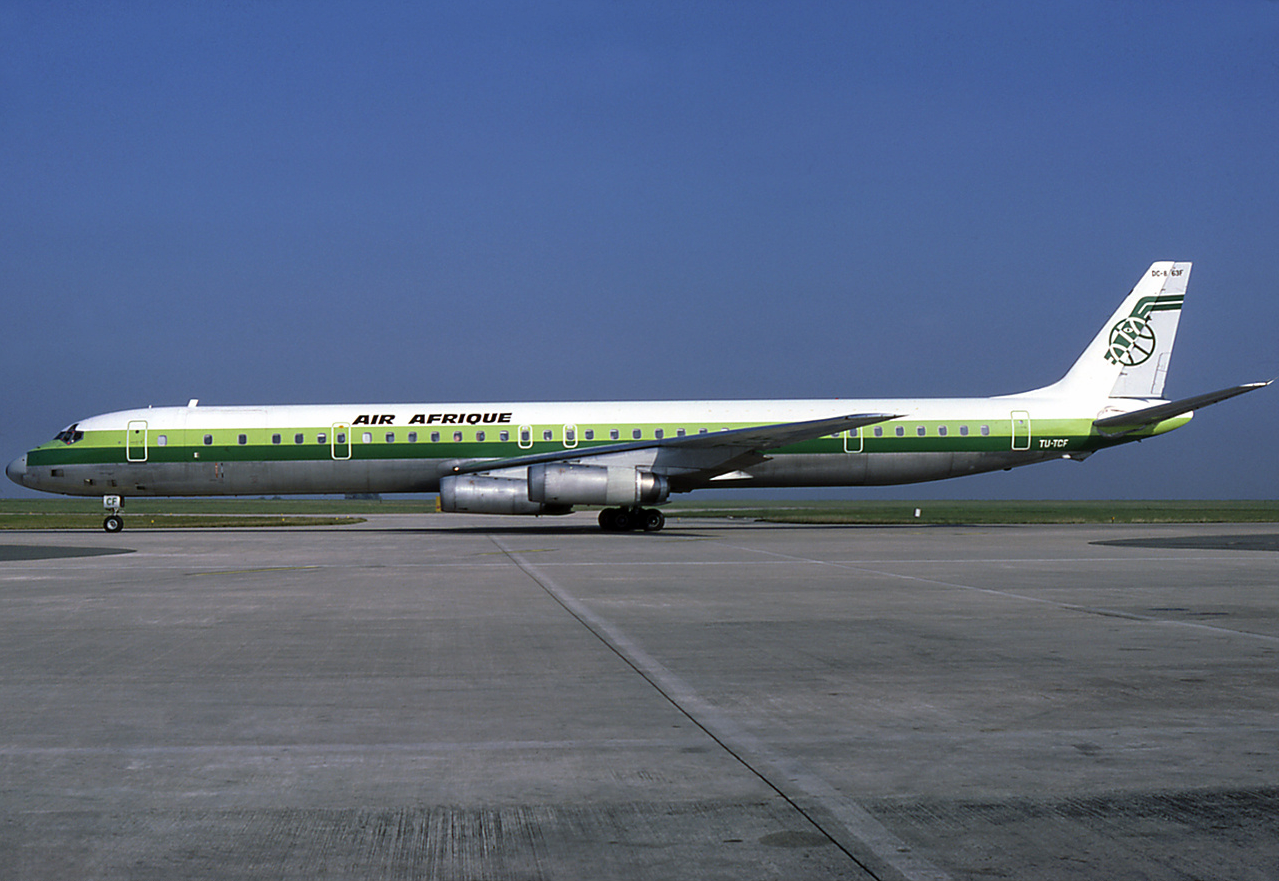
An Air Afrique Douglas DC-8-63CF at Charles de Gaulle Airport in 1980.

The airline historically operated a wide variety of aircraft:

- Airbus A300B2
- Airbus A300B4-200
- Airbus A300-600R
- Airbus A310-300
- Airbus A330-200
- Antonov An-12
- Boeing 707-320
- Boeing 707-320C
- Boeing 727-200
- Boeing 737-200
- Boeing 737-200 Cargo
- Boeing 737-300
- Boeing 747-100
- Boeing 747-200
- Boeing 747-200F
- Boeing 767-300ER
- Caravelle 10R
- Caravelle 11R
- Convair 990
- Douglas C-47 Skytrain
- Douglas DC-3
- Douglas DC-4
- Douglas DC-6
- Douglas DC-8-30
- Douglas DC-8-50
- Douglas DC-8-50F
- Douglas DC-8-63CF
- Hawker Siddeley HS 748
- Lockheed Constellation
- Lockheed Starliner
- Lockheed L-1011 TriStar
- McDonnell Douglas DC-10-30
- McDonnell Douglas MD-11
- McDonnell Douglas MD-81
- NAMC YS-11

== Accidents and incidents ==
According to Aviation Safety Network, Air Afrique experienced seven accidents/incidents; only two of them led to fatalities.

=== Accidents involving fatalities ===
- 3 May 1963: The first hull-loss accident experienced by the company, as well as the deadliest one, occurred when a Douglas DC-6B, with aircraft registration F-BIAO, operating an international scheduled Douala International Airport to Lagos-Ikeja International Airport flight, crashed into Mt. Cameroon when flying at too low altitude on a prohibited route. There were 55 fatalities.

=== Incidents involving fatalities ===
- 24 July 1987: A McDonnell Douglas DC-10-30 operating Air Afrique Flight 056, an international scheduled Brazzaville–Rome–Paris service was hijacked while flying over Milan by a Shiite, Lebanese, 21-year-old man named Hussein Ali Mohammed Hariri, member of Hezbollah. There were 148 passengers (64 of them French) and 15 crew members on board. The hijacker demanded the release of two of his brothers imprisoned on terrorism charges in West Germany, one of whom was accused of hijacking the TWA Flight 847 in 1985, and also to be flown to Beirut. While refuelling at Geneva International Airport, a French passenger was shot to death by Hariri, as a sign of his determination after his demands were not met. During a moment of distraction, some of the passengers on board managed to escape from the jetliner using the rear doors; a flight attendant that jumped on Hariri was shot and injured by him. After a standoff the aircraft was stormed by the Swiss police and the hijacker was overpowered.

=== Non-fatal hull-losses ===
- 28 February 1971: A Douglas C-54A, with aircraft registration TT-DAA, operating a freighter service, crashed into the ground ahead of the runway on final approach to Fort Archambault Airport, Chad, when the pilot misinterpreted the actual height of the aircraft.

== See also ==
- Balafon was the name of the in-flight magazine
- Airlines of Africa

== Bibliography ==
- Guttery, Ben R. (1998). Encyclopedia of African Airlines. Jefferson, North Carolina: Mc Farland & Company, Inc. ISBN 0-7864-0495-7.
