= Economy of Burkina Faso =

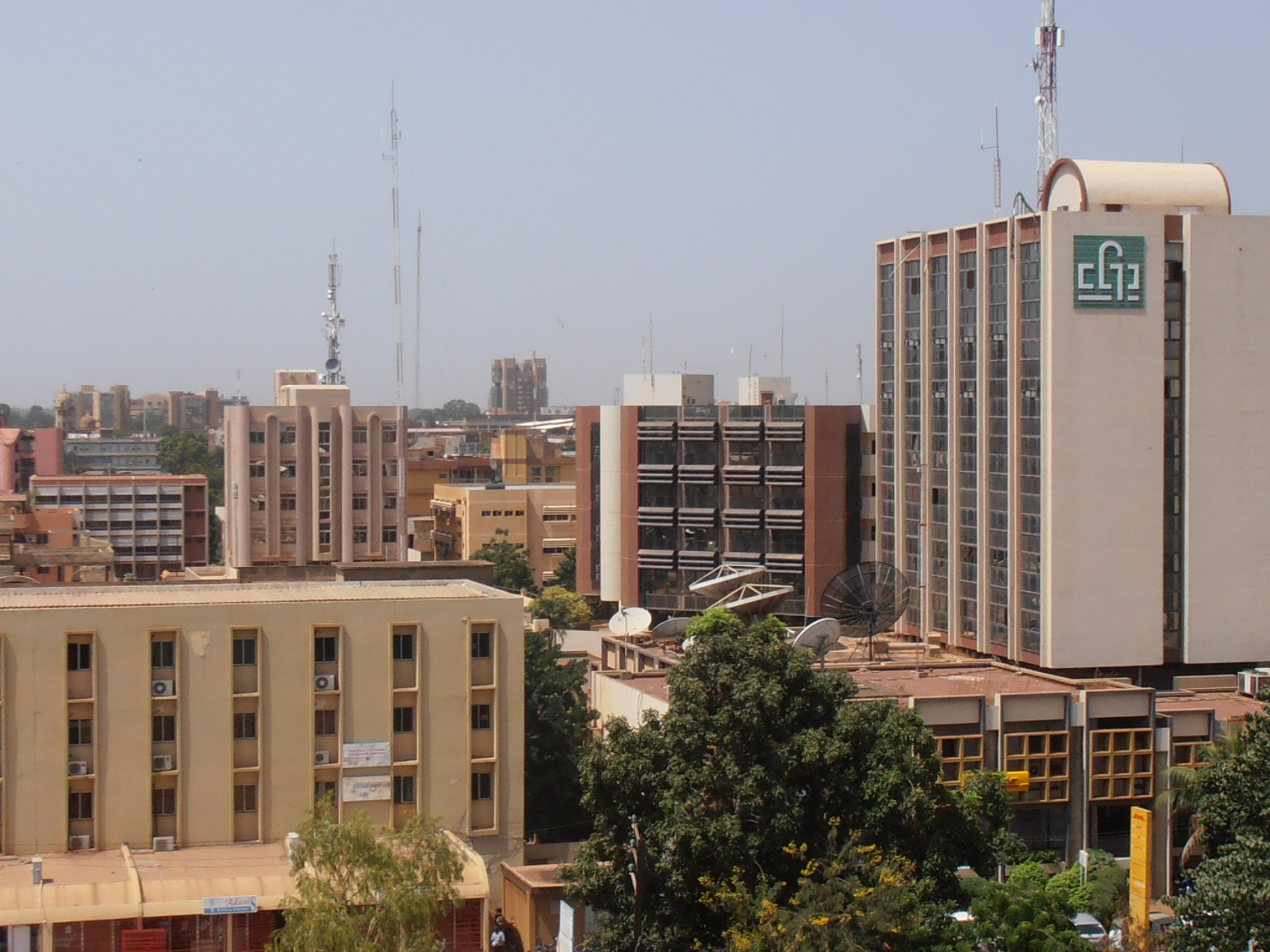
- Ouagadougou, the financial centre of Burkina Faso
- Currency: CFA Franc (XOF)
- Fiscal year: Calendar year
- Trade organisations: AU, AfCFTA, CEN-SAD, WTO
- Country group: Least developed; Low-income economy

Statistics
- Population: ▲24,074,580 (2025)
- GDP: ▲$32.51 billion (nominal; (2026); ▲$79.54 billion (PPP; (2026)
- GDP rank: 115th (nominal; 2026); 116th (PPP; 2026)
- GDP growth: ▲5% (2025); ▲4.9% (2026); ▲4.8% (2027f)
- GDP per capita: ▲$1,319 (nominal; (2026); ▲$3,227 (PPP; (2026)
- GDP per capita rank: 170th (nominal; 2026); 175th (PPP; 2026)
- GDP by sector: agriculture: 31%; industry: 23.9%; services: 44.9%; (2017 est.)
- Inflation (CPI): ▲1.5% (2026)
- Population below national poverty line: 43.2% in poverty (2021); 42.1% on less than $1.90/day (2021)
- Gini coefficient: 37.4 medium (2021)
- Human Development Index: ▲0.459 low (2023) (186th); ▲0.273 IHDI (2023)
- Labour force: ▲8,074,705 (2021); a large part of the male labor force migrates annually to neighboring countries for seasonal employment; 61.4% employment rate (2014)
- Labour force by occupation: agriculture 90%, industry and services 10% (2000 est.)
- Unemployment: 5% (2023)
- Informal employment: 93.8% (2024)
- Main industries: cotton, beverages, agricultural processing, soap, cigarettes, textiles, gold

External
- Exports: ▲$5.87 billion (2023)
- Export goods: gold, cotton, livestock, sesame seeds
- Main export partners: Benin 25.9%; Togo 12%; Japan 5.7%; Thailand 5.6%; Turkey 5.1%; Ivory Coast 4.9%; Ghana 4.6%; (2013 est.)
- Imports: ▲$7.31 billion (2023)
- Import goods: capital goods, foodstuffs, petroleum
- Main import partners: Ivory Coast 18.9%; Pakistan 18.1%; Ghana 4.5%; India 4.3%; China 4.3%; Togo 4.2%; (2013 est.)
- FDI stock: n/av
- Gross external debt: ▲$5.6 billion (2024)

Public finance
- Government debt: 52.7% of GDP (2024 est.)
- Foreign reserves: ▼$0.049 billion (31 December 2017)
- Revenue: $2.666 billion (2017 est.)
- Spending: $3.655 billion (2017 est.)
- Credit rating: Standard & Poor's: B (Domestic); B (Foreign); BBB- (T&C Assessment)
- All values, unless otherwise stated, are in US dollars.

Burkina Faso has a developing, low-income economy. It is based primarily on subsistence farming and livestock raising. Burkina Faso has a low average income level, with GDP per capita estimated at $3,000 (PPP) and $1,100 (nominal) in the mid-2020s. More than 80% of the population relies on subsistence agriculture with only a small fraction directly involved in industry and services. Highly variable rainfall, poor soils, lack of adequate communications and other infrastructure, a low literacy rate, and a stagnant economy are all longstanding problems of this landlocked country. The export economy also remained subject to fluctuations in world prices.

The country has a high population density, fragile soil, and abundant natural resources like gold. Industry remains dominated by government-controlled corporations. Following the African franc currency devaluation in January 1994 the government updated its development program in conjunction with international agencies, and exports and economic growth have increased. Maintenance of its macroeconomic progress depends on continued low inflation, reduction in the trade deficit, and reforms designed to encourage private investment.

== Financial System Overview ==
The Burkinabé financial system represents 30% of the country's GDP and is dominated by the banking sector, which accounts for 90% of total financial system assets. Eleven banks and five non-bank financial institutions operate in the country.

The banking sector is highly concentrated, with the three largest banks holding nearly 60% of total financial sector assets. Banks are generally adequately capitalized, but remain vulnerable due to their overexposure to the cotton sector, the prices of which are subject to significant oscillations.

A December 2018 report from the World Bank indicates that cotton had become the most important cash crop, while gold exports were increasing in recent years. In 2017, economic growth increased to 6.4% in 2017 (vs. 5.9% in 2016) primarily due to gold production and increased investment in infrastructure. The increase in consumption linked to growth of the wage bill also supported economic growth. Inflation remained low, 0.4% that year but the public deficit grew to 7.7% of GDP (vs. 3.5% in 2016). The government was continuing to get financial aid and loans to finance the debt. To finance the public deficit, the Government combined concessional aid and borrowing on the regional market. The World Bank said that the economic outlook remained favorable in the short and medium term, although that could be negatively impacted. Risks included high oil prices (imports), lower prices of gold and cotton (exports) as well as terrorist threat and labour strikes.

== Sectors ==
=== Agriculture ===
Burkina Faso produced in 2018:

- 1.9 million tons of sorghum;
- 1.7 million tons of maize;
- 1.1 million tons of millet;
- 630 thousand tons of cowpea (3rd largest producer in the world, preceded only by Niger and Nigeria);
- 490 thousand tons of sugar cane;
- 482 thousand tons of cotton;
- 329 thousand tons of peanut;
- 253 thousand tons of sesame seed (8th largest producer in the world);
- 240 thousand tons of vegetable;
- 160 thousand tons of rice;
- 103 thousand tons of cashew nuts (12th largest producer in the world);

In addition to smaller productions of other agricultural products.

=== Mining industry ===
Gold mining often plays a significant role in Burkina Faso’s economy. Burkina Faso has become Africa's 4th biggest producer of gold in 2012. Production of mineral commodities is limited to cement, dolomite, gold, granite, marble, phosphate rock, pumice, other volcanic materials, and salt.

Burkina Faso has undergone significant changes in fiscal policy regarding gold mining as the country focuses on the nationalization of industrial resources. Since the new mining code established in 2024, Burkina Faso has increased state ownership in the mining industry, increased regulation of mining corporations, and reduced tax benefits for companies in the mining sector.

Child slavery is commonplace in the gold industry. Mining accidents are not uncommon, with one of the most prominent cases being when eight miners were trapped underground in the Canadian-owned zinc mine in Perkoa by flood waters. The unexpected flooding happened during dry season at Burkina Faso on 16 April 2022. While other workers have evacuated safely, the 8 missing workers were working below level 520 or 520 meters from the surface.

=== Tourism ===
Burkina Faso has many interesting locations for tourists. However, the country annually receives less tourism than most African countries.

== Infrastrucure ==
=== Energy ===
Energy in Burkina Faso is sourced primarily from diesel and heavy fuel, with some access to hydropower and solar.

Burkina Faso produced 69 kilotonnes of oil equivalent (ktoe) of energy in 2015, 89.8% of which was generated from fossil fuels. Final consumption of electricity was 86 ktoe. The country uses energy from biomass, fossil fuels, hydroelectricity, and solar.

As of 2014, Burkina Faso's total greenhouse gas emissions were at 32.60 million metric tons of carbon dioxide equivalent (MtCO_{2}e). The country has committed to reducing its emissions by at least 7.8 MtCO_{2}e (or 6.6%) by 2030. The country targets 100% of its electricity generation to come from renewable sources by 2050.

=== Transport ===
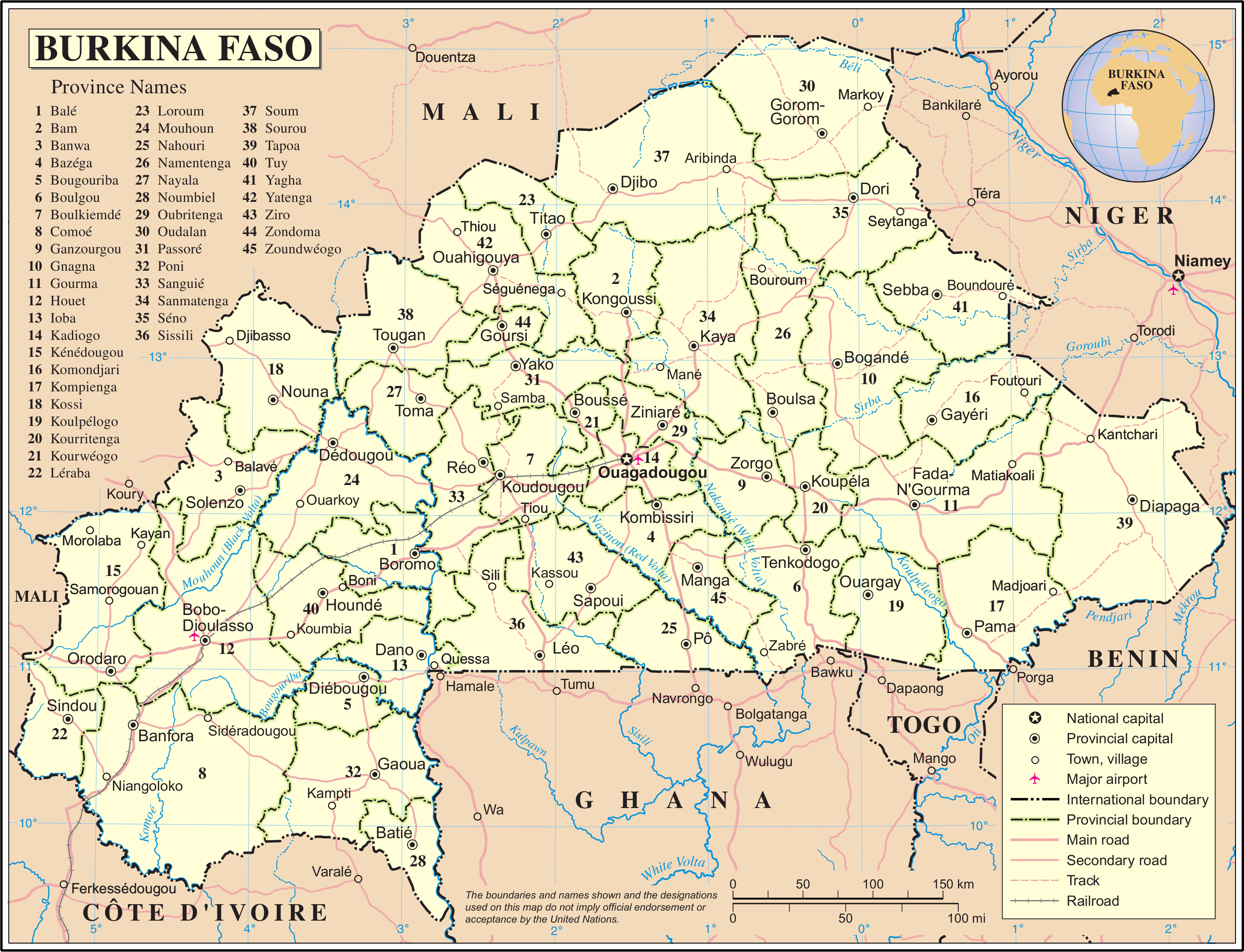
A 2007 map of Burkina Faso, including main and secondary roads, major airports, and railroad lines

Transport in Burkina Faso consists primarily of road, air and rail transportation. The World Bank classified country's transportation as underdeveloped but noted that Burkina Faso is a natural geographic transportation hub for West Africa.

=== Telecommunications ===
Telecommunications in Burkina Faso include radio, television, fixed and mobile telephones, and the Internet.

The telephony market in Burkina Faso is still relatively underdeveloped. Although mobile penetration is just over 100%, it is still below the African average. Fixed-line telephony and internet connections are very low, due in large part to poor network infrastructure. The government has a number of policies intended to improve the levels of investment and usage of networks but the impact of the SARS-Cov2 pandemic has hampered such efforts.

Radio is the country's most popular communications medium. Use of telecommunications in Burkina Faso are extremely low, limited due to the low penetration of electricity, even in major cities. There were just 141,400 fixed line phones in use in 2012, in a country with a population of 17.4 million. Use of mobile phones has skyrocketed from 1.0 million lines in 2006 to 10 million in 2012. Internet use is also low, with only 3.7 users per 100 inhabitants in 2012, just over 643,000 users total. The Internet penetration rate in Africa as a whole was 16 users per 100 inhabitants in 2013.

== Macro-economic trend ==
The following table shows the leading economic indicators from 1980 to 2024. Inflation below 5% is in green.

Year	GDP (in bn. US$ PPP)	GDP per capita (in US$ PPP)	GDP (in bn. US$ nominal)	GDP Growth (%, real)	Inflation rate (%)	Government debt (Percentage of GDP)
1980	2.7	385	2.4	▲4.0	▲12.3	n/a
1985	▲4.1	▲510	▼1.7	▲11.3	▲7.1	n/a
1990	▲5.5	▲601	▲3.5	▼ -0.6	▲ -0.8	n/a
1995	▲7.5	▲725	▼2.7	▲5.7	▲7.8	n/a
2000	▲11.3	▲950	▲3.0	▲1.9	▲ -0.2	n/a
2005	▲17.3	▲1242	▲6.2	▲8.7	▲6.4	▲39.2
2006	▲18.9	▲1318	▲6.5	▲6.3	▲2.3	▼20.1
2007	▲20.3	▲1368	▲7.6	▲4.1	▲ -0.2	▲22.4
2008	▲21.9	▲1432	▲9.5	▲5.8	▲10.7	▲24.9
2009	▲22.6	▲1441	▼9.4	▲3.0	▲0.9	▲25.9
2010	▲24.8	▲1536	▲10.1	▲8.4	▲ -0.6	▼23.7
2011	▲27.0	▲1623	▲12.1	▲6.6	▲2.8	▲24.5
2012	▲29.3	▲1707	▲12.6	▲6.5	▲3.8	▲25.2
2013	▲31.5	▲1783	▲13.4	▲5.8	▲0.5	▲25.9
2014	▲33.5	▲1837	▲13.9	▲4.3	▲ -0.3	▲26.1
2015	▲35.1	▲1870	▼11.8	▲3.9	▲1.7	▲31.3
2016	▲37.6	▲1943	▲12.8	▲6.0	▲0.4	▲32.9
2017	▲40.6	▲2041	▲14.1	▲6.2	▲1.5	▲33.9
2018	▲42.4	▲2076	▲15.9	▲6.6	▲2.0	▲38.1
2019	▲47.0	▲2240	▲16.1	▲5.9	▲ -3.2	▲41.7
2020	▲51.4	▲2392	▲17.8	▲2.0	▲1.9	▲43.6
2021	▲54.7	▲2486	▲19.7	▲6.9	▲3.9	▲55.5
2022	▲59.5	▲2645	▼18.7	▲1.6	▲13.8	▲59.2
2023	▲63.6	▲2762	▲20.1	▲3.0	▲0.9	▼56.8
2024	▲68.3	▲2899	▲23.1	▲4.8	▲4.2	▲57.2
2025	▲73.7	▲3060	▲27.1	▲5.0	▲ -0.5	▼52
2026	▲79.5	▲3227	▲32.5	▲4.9	▲1.5	▼48.8

Current GDP per capita of Burkina Faso grew 13% in the 60s reaching a peak growth of 237% in the 70s. But this proved unsustainable and growth consequently scaled back to 23% in the 80s. Finally, it shrank by 37% in the 90s. Average wages in 2007 hover around 2 to 3 dollars per day.

Although disadvantaged by an extremely resource-deprived domestic economy, Burkina Faso remains committed to the structural adjustment program it launched in 1991. It has largely recovered from the devaluation of the CFA in January 1994, with a 1996 growth rate of 5.9%.

Many Burkinabé migrate to neighbouring countries for work, and their remittances provide a substantial contribution to the balance of payments. Burkina Faso is attempting to improve the economy by developing its mineral resources, improving its infrastructure, making its agricultural and livestock sectors more productive and competitive, and stabilizing the supplies and prices of cereals.

The agricultural economy remains highly vulnerable to fluctuations in rainfall. The Mossi Plateau in north central Burkina Faso faces encroachment from the Sahara. The resultant southward migration means heightened competition for control of very limited water resources south of the Mossi Plateau. Most of the population ekes out a living as subsistence farmers, living with problems of climate, soil erosion, and rudimentary technology. The staple crops are pearl millet, sorghum, maize, and rice. The cash crops are cotton, groundnuts, karite (shea nuts), and sesame. Livestock, once a major export, has declined.

A 2018 report by the African Development Bank Group discussed a macroeconomic evolution: "higher investment and continued spending on social services and security that will add to the budget deficit". This group's prediction for 2018 indicated that the budget deficit would be reduced to 4.8% of GDP in 2018 and to 2.9% in 2019. Public debt associated with the National Economic and Social Development Plan was estimated at 36.9% of GDP in 2017.

== External trade ==
Exports of Burkina Faso by product category (2019) Chemical products Transportation Machines Mineral products Plastics and rubbers Metals Foodstuffs Precious metals Textiles Instruments Animal products Vegetable products Paper goods Footwear and headwear Miscellaneous Stone and glass Wood products Animal and vegetable bi-products Animal hides Arts and antiques Weapons

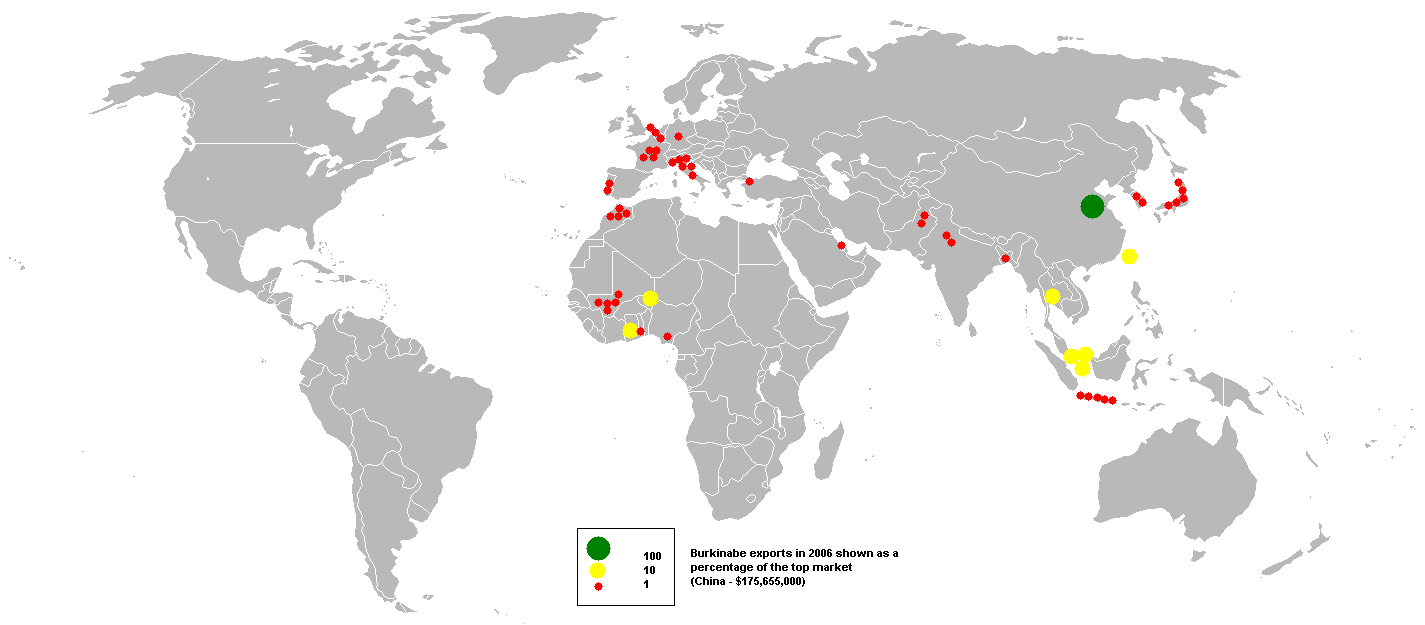
Burkinabé exports in 2006

Industry, still in an embryonic stage, is located primarily in Bobo-Dioulasso, Ouagadougou, Banfora, and Koudougou. Manufacturing is limited to food processing, textiles, and other import substitution heavily protected by tariffs. Some factories are privately owned, and others are set to be privatized. Burkina Faso's exploitable natural resources are limited, although a manganese ore deposit is located in the remote northeast. Gold mining has increased greatly since the mid-1980s and, along with cotton, is a leading export money earner. However, both gold and cotton are listed as goods produced mostly by child labor and forced labor according to a recent U.S. Department of Labor report.

Cargo destined for Burkina Faso must be covered by an Electronic Cargo Tracking Note (French: Bordereau électronique de suivi des cargaisons, BESC), administered by the Conseil Burkinabè des Chargeurs (CBC). Introduced by a 2009 decree, it is established at the port of shipment — including through the CBC's offices in transit ports such as Abidjan, Lomé, Cotonou and Tema — and records consignment data for traceability and customs clearance.

== Child labour ==
According to the United States Department of Labor in 2012, 37.8% of children in Burkina Faso aged 5-14 were working, while another 13.6% were both going to school and working.

Children working in granite quarries and gold mines were working 6 to 7 days a week for up to 14 hours per day. So-called "payment" is in the form of food to eat and a place to sleep. Since that time, the government has adopted a National Action Plan, and in collaboration with Interpol, have since have rescued many children from child trafficking.

By 2023, the percentage of children working in Burkina Faso had dropped slightly to 35.7%, according to the United States' Department of Labor.

Christian Children's Fund of Canada (CCFC) has partnered with EDUCO, a fellow member of the ChildFund Alliance, to implement a European Union-funded project in north Burkina to prevent children from working in mines.

A 2023 Burkinabé government study found that in the north of the country, 30.1% of children work permanently in gold mine.

== See also ==
- Agriculture in Burkina Faso
- List of companies based in Burkina Faso
- United Nations Economic Commission for Africa
- List of banks in Burkina Faso
