= Air Afrique destinations =

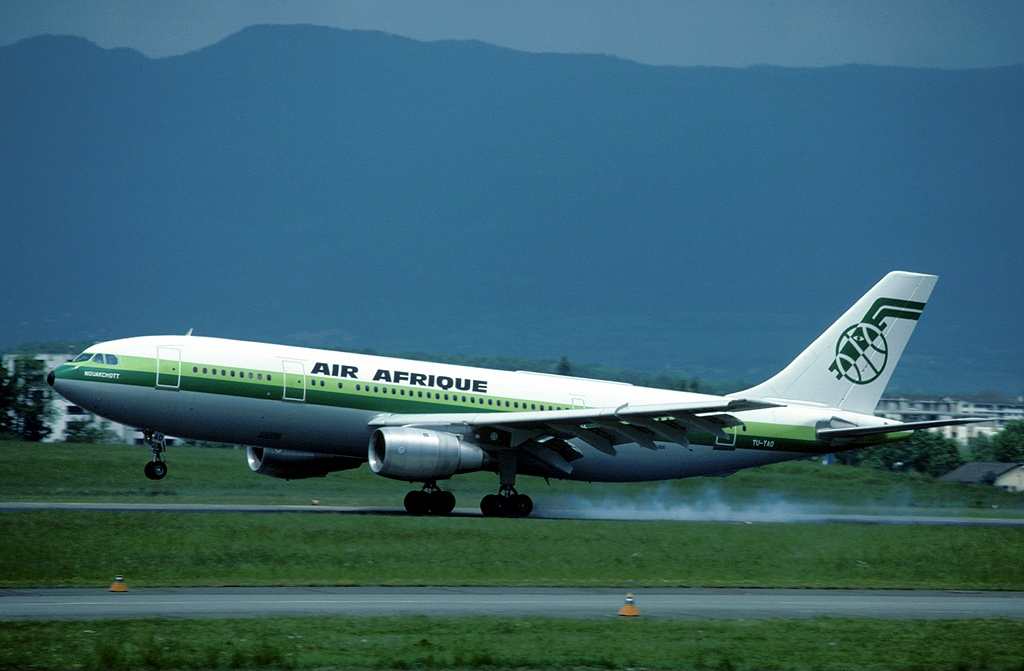
An Air Afrique Airbus A300B4-200 lands at Geneva Airport in 1982

Air Afrique came into being in 1961 as a joint venture between Air France, Union Aéromaritime de Transport (UAT), and eleven former French-speaking colonies in Western and Central Africa, namely Cameroon, Central African Republic, Chad, Republic of the Congo, Dahomey, Gabon, Ivory Coast, Mauritania, Niger, Senegal, and Upper Volta. Initially, the company inaugurated its services flying routes within those countries, and linking them as well. On 5 January 1962, the carrier inaugurated its first intercontinental flights with Boeing 707s leased from Air France serving the Paris–Dakar–Abidjan and Paris–Douala–Brazzaville routes.

The airline ceased operations in 2002. Following is a list of destinations the airline served all through its history. All destinations shown are currently terminated. Each destination is provided with the country name, the name of the airport served, and both its International Air Transport Association (IATA) three-letter designator (IATA airport code) and its International Civil Aviation Organization (ICAO) four-letter designator (ICAO airport code). The list also includes the airports that served either as a hub or as a focus city for the carrier, as well as the destinations served at the time of closure.

== List ==
^{†}	Hub
^{‡}	Focus city
^{#}	Destination served at the time of closure

City	Country/Region	IATA	ICAO	Airport	Refs
Abidjan	Ivory Coast	ABJ	DIAP	Port Bouet Airport ^{†} ^{#}	
Abu Dhabi	United Arab Emirates	AUH	OMAA	Zayed International Airport	
Accra	Ghana	ACC	DGAA	Accra International Airport	
Athens	Greece	ATH	LGAT	Ellinikon International Airport ^{#}	
Bamako	Mali	BKO	GABS	Senou International Airport ^{#}	
Bangui	Central African Republic	BGF	FEFF	Bangui M'Poko International Airport ^{#}	
Banjul	Gambia	BJL	GBYD	Banjul International Airport ^{#}	
Batouri	Cameroon	OUR	FKKI	Batouri Airport	
Beirut	Lebanon	BEY	OLBA	Beirut–Rafic Hariri International Airport	
Bissau	Guinea-Bissau	OXB	GGOV	Osvaldo Vieira International Airport	
Bobo-Dioulasso	Burkina Faso	BOY	DFOO	Bobo Dioulasso Airport	
Bordeaux	France	BOD	LFBD	Bordeaux–Mérignac Airport	
Brazzaville	Republic of the Congo	BZV	FCBB	Maya-Maya Airport ^{#}	
Casablanca	Morocco	CMN	GMMN	Mohammed V International Airport ^{#}	
Conakry	Guinea	CKY	GUCY	Conakry International Airport	
Cotonou	Benin	COO	DBBB	Cadjehoun Airport ^{#}	
Dakar	Senegal	DKR	GOOY	Léopold Sédar Senghor International Airport ^{‡} ^{#}	
Douala	Cameroon	DLA	FKKD	Douala International Airport ^{#}	
Freetown	Sierra Leone	FNA	GFLL	Lungi International Airport	
Garoua	Cameroon	GOU	FKKR	Garoua International Airport	
Geneva	Switzerland	GVA	LSGG	Geneva Airport ^{#}	
Jeddah	Saudi Arabia	JED	OEJN	King Abdulaziz International Airport	
Johannesburg	South Africa	JNB	FAJS	O. R. Tambo International Airport	
Kano	Nigeria	KAN	DNKN	Mallam Aminu Kano International Airport	
Kinshasa	Democratic Republic of the Congo	FIH	FZAA	N'djili Airport	
Lagos	Nigeria	LOS	DNMM	Murtala Mohammed International Airport	
Las Palmas de Gran Canaria	Spain	LPA	GCLP	Gran Canaria Airport	
Libreville	Gabon	LBV	FOOL	Libreville International Airport ^{#}	
Lisbon	Portugal	LIS	LPPT	Lisbon Portela Airport	
Lomé	Togo	LFW	DXXX	Lomé-Tokoin Airport ^{#}	
London	United Kingdom	LGW	EGKK	Gatwick Airport	
London	United Kingdom	LHR	EGLL	Heathrow Airport	
Lyon	France	LYS	LFLL	Lyon–Saint-Exupéry Airport	
Malabo	Equatorial Guinea	SSG	FGSL	Malabo International Airport	
Maroua	Cameroon	MVR	FKKL	Salak Airport	
Marseille	France	MRS	LFML	Marseille Provence Airport ^{#}	
Monrovia	Liberia	ROB	GLRB	Roberts International Airport	
N'Djamena	Chad	NDJ	FTTJ	N'Djamena International Airport ^{#}	
Nairobi	Kenya	NBO	HKJK	Jomo Kenyatta International Airport	
New York	United States	JFK	KJFK	John F. Kennedy International Airport ^{#}	
Ngaoundéré	Cameroon	NGE	FKKN	Ngaoundéré Airport	
Niamey	Niger	NIM	DRRN	Diori Hamani International Airport ^{#}	
Nice	France	NCE	LFMN	Nice Côte d'Azur Airport	
Nouadhibou	Mauritania	NDB	GQPP	Nouadhibou International Airport	
Nouakchott	Mauritania	NKC	GQNN	Nouakchott International Airport ^{#}	
Ouagadougou	Burkina Faso	OUA	DFFD	Ouagadougou Airport ^{#}	
Paris	France	CDG	LFPG	Charles de Gaulle Airport ^{#}	
Paris	France	LBG	LFPB	Paris–Le Bourget Airport	
Pointe Noire	Republic of the Congo	PNR	FCPP	Pointe Noire Airport ^{#}	
Port-Gentil	Gabon	POG	FOOG	Port-Gentil International Airport	
Rome	Italy	FCO	LIRF	Rome Fiumicino Airport ^{#}	
Saint-Louis	Senegal	XLS	GOSS	Saint-Louis Airport	
Yagoua	Cameroon	GXX	FKKJ	Yagoua Airport	
Yaoundé	Cameroon	NSI	FKYS	Yaoundé Nsimalen International Airport	
Zurich	Switzerland	ZRH	LSZH	Zurich Airport	
