= Lyman Post =

American publisher

Lyman Post (1863 – 30 November 1933) was an American publisher and editor who spent much of his life working to develop the American paper production industry. He was born in 1863 in Staten Island. His father, Jacob Post, owned clipper ships. Lyman Post worked as a reporter for both The New York Press and the New York Sun. He was involved in the founding of the American Paper and Pulp Association. He was the publisher of the Paper Mill and Wood Pulp News, a trade journal about the paper industry that he founded in 1878. He used the pen name "Derb" for some of his editorial writing.
