= William Post =

William Post may refer to:

- William B. Post (1857–1921), American photographer
- William Post Jr. (1901–1989), American actor and drama instructor
- William Post (polo player) (1911–1965), American polo player
- William Post (businessman) (1927–2024), American food manufacturer, inventor of Pop-Tarts
- William Post (lottery winner) (1939–2006), American lottery winner

== See also ==
- Bill Post, American politician and radio personality in Oregon
- William Post Mansion, Buckhannon, West Virginia
