= La Poste du Bénin =

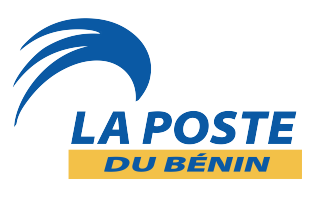
- Industry: Postal Service
- Headquarters: Benin

La Poste du Bénin is the government organisation responsible for the post in Benin.

Benin has been a member of the Universal Postal Union since 27 April 1961 and is also a member of the West African Postal Conference.

== See also ==
- Postage stamps and postal history of Benin
