= Société Centrafricaine des Postes =

Central African Republic postal service

Société Centrafricaine des Postes (SOCAPOST), formerly Office National des Postes et de l'Épargne (ONPE) until 2022, is the government organization responsible for the postal service in the Central African Republic.

== See also ==
- Communications in Central African Republic
