= La Poste (Gabon) =

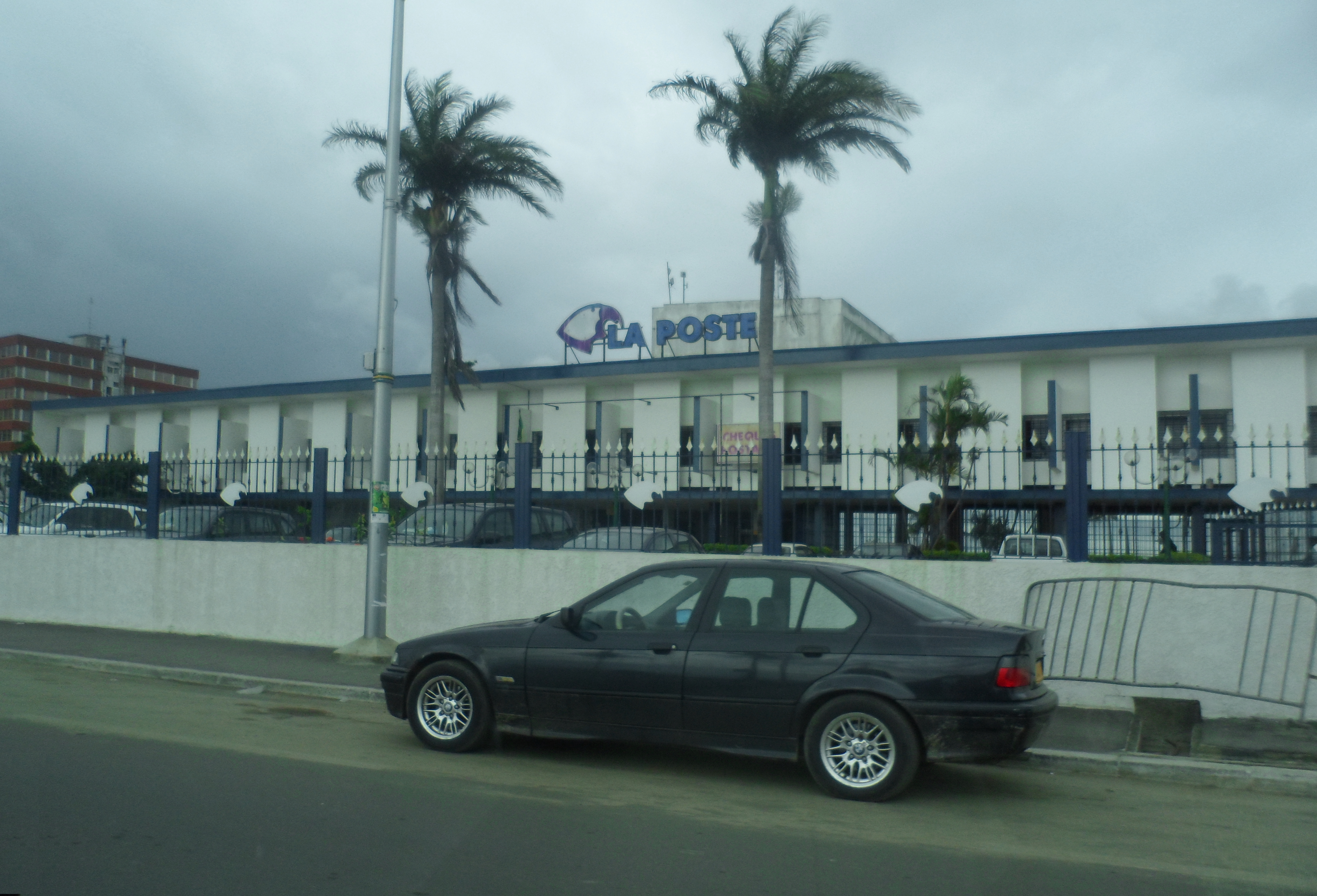
Post office building in Libreville

La Poste (French pronunciation: [la pɔst]) or La Poste gabonaise is the company responsible for postal service in Gabon.

In June 2001, the Office des postes et télécommunications (OPT) was dissolved, and postal activities were transferred to the public limited company Gabon Poste. After the liquidation of Gabon Poste in 2006, La Poste SA took over the activities with new management. The Gabonese postal service is regulated by Law 006/2001 of 27 June 2001.
