= Office de la poste guinéenne =

Office de la poste guinéenne (French pronunciation: [ɔfis də la pɔst ɡineɛn], lit. 'Guinean Post Office') or OPG is the company responsible for postal service in Guinea.
