= La Poste Burkina Faso =

Postal service company in Burkina Faso

- Industry: Postal Service
- Founded: 28 April 1997
- Headquarters: Burkina Faso

La Poste Burkina Faso, formerly SONAPOST until 2018, is the company responsible for postal service in Burkina Faso. Established on 28 April 1997, it has the same tasks as the former National Post Office (ONP), the national postal company resulting from the split between the post office and telecommunications functions of the government in February 1987. Burkina Faso is a member of the West African Postal Conference.
