= Office national des postes du Mali =

- Industry: Postal service
- Headquarters: Mali

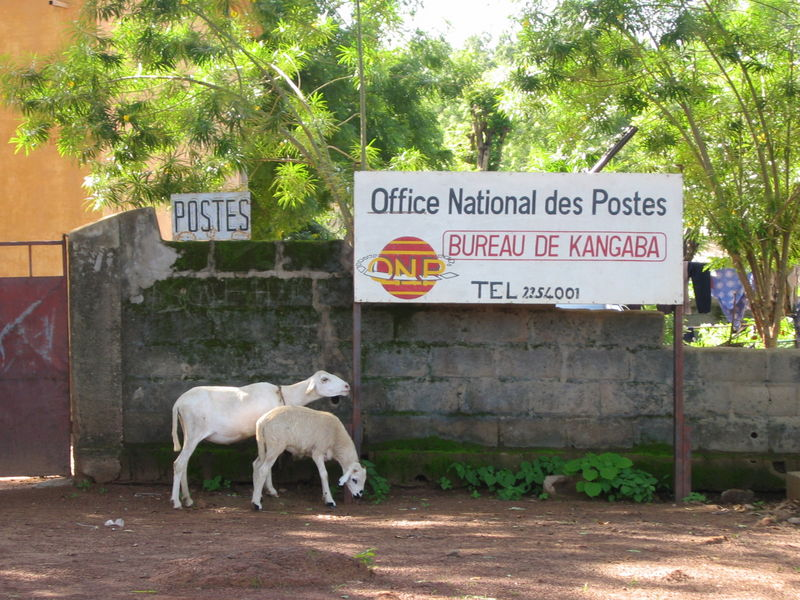
Bureau de poste, Kangaba, Mali, 2005

Office national des postes du Mali (La Poste du Mali) is the company responsible for postal service in Mali.

Mali has been a Universal Postal Union member since 21 April 1961, and is a member of the West African Postal Conference.
