= Naganagani =

Airline in Burkina Faso from 1984

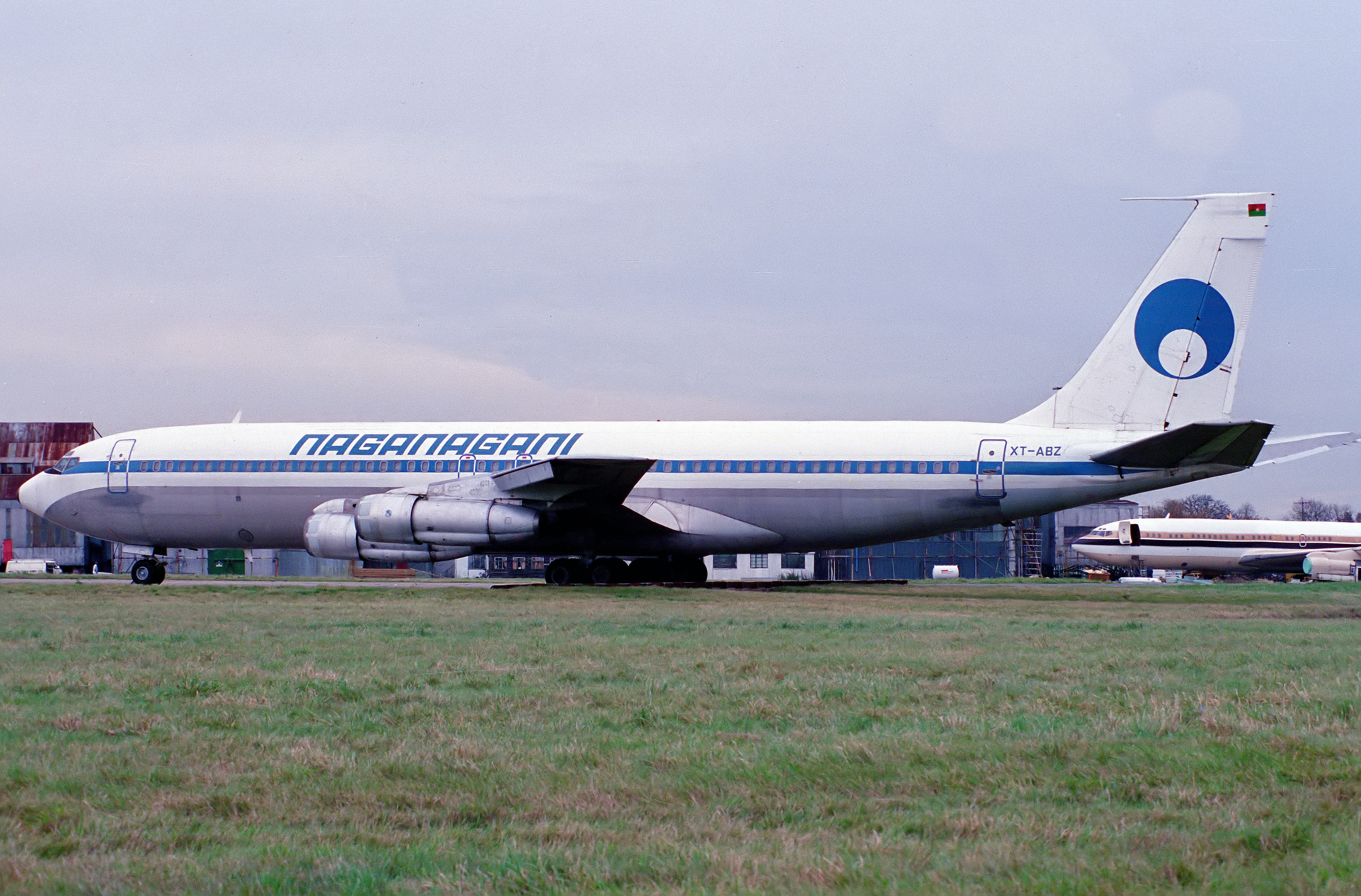
- A Boeing 707 of Nagannani
IATA	ICAO	Call sign
-	BFN	-
- Founded: 1984
- Ceased operations: 1992
- Operating bases: Thomas Sankara International Airport
- Fleet size: 3
- Headquarters: Ouagadougou, Boucle du Mouhoun, Burkina Faso

Naganagani (Compagnie Nationale Naganagani) was a state-owned airline based in Burkina Faso. It was founded in 1984 and launched operations with a single cargo Boeing 707 jet registered as XT-ABX. In the airline's final years, the plane was operated on behalf of Air Afrique. An extra passenger-configured 707, XT-ABZ, joined the company in 1987. In 1989 a third 707, XT-BBF, was purchased for use as a presidential aircraft.
