= La Poste (Senegal) =

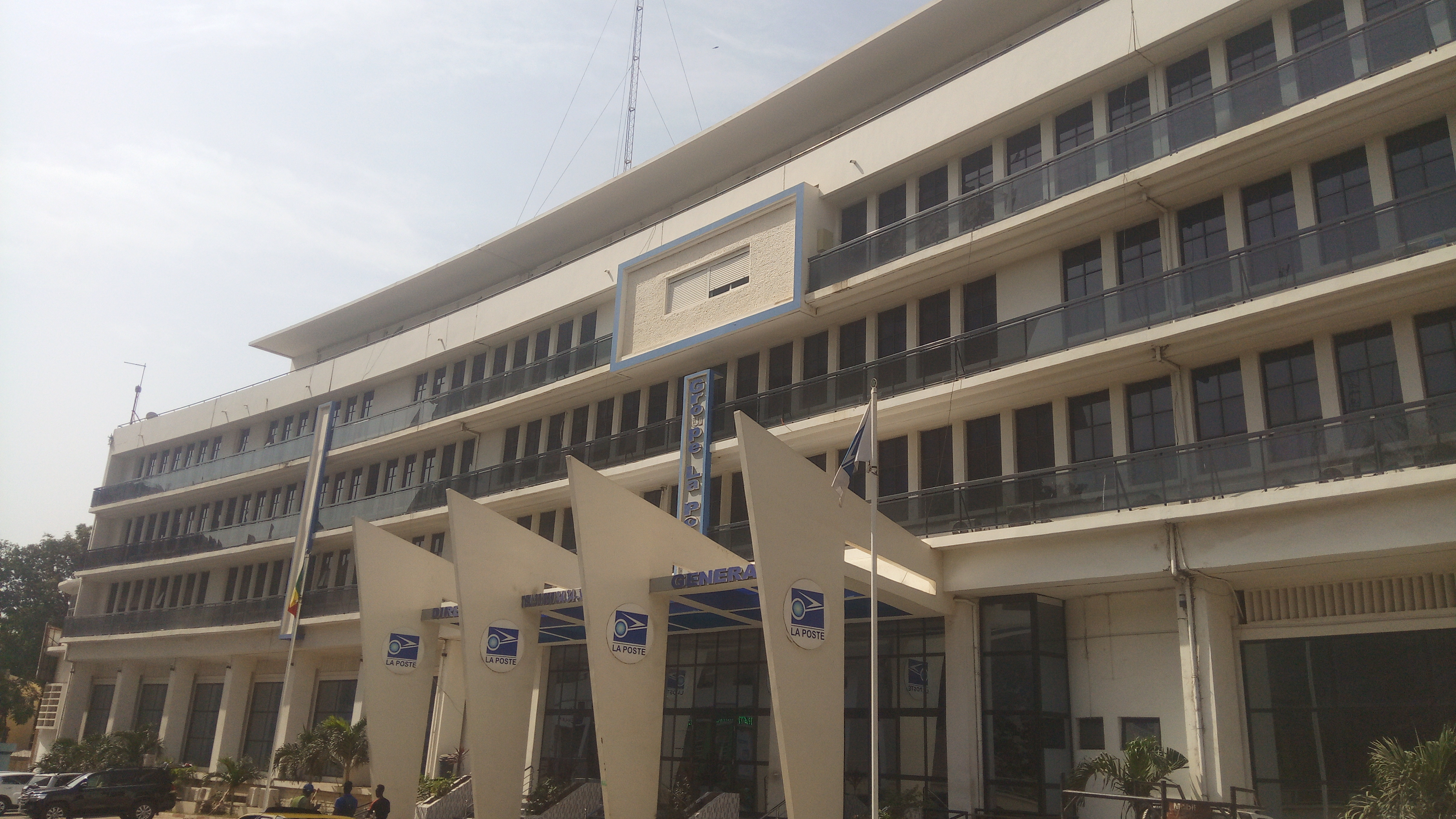
Headquarters of La Poste Sénégal

La Poste (French pronunciation: [la pɔst]) is a postal service company in Senegal. La Poste is a member of the Universal Postal Union.

== History ==
The appearance of the postal system in Senegal coincides with the country's colonial conquest. It served as a critical tool of colonialism. Before colonization, information was exchanged on foot or horseback under the services of kings and local rulers. The transmission of important messages across short distances was done with the help of drums played to a specific beat. This was used to announce events such as weddings, births, baptisms, deaths, enemy attacks, and preparation for a military expedition.

Under colonialism, a quicker method of communication appeared. For rulers, communication with other rulers and with their subjects spread throughout the country became a more and more pressing need. They had in their courts an epistolary service whose task was to carry correspondences.

People speaking Arabic, French and other African languages were in charge of this system which was starting to resemble a postal service. A full-fledged postal service was in operation by 1626. The year marked the start of postal communication between Senegal and France. Ships from the merchant associations of Rouen and Dieppe carried postal packages between the two countries.

In 1758, these associations were replaced by the French East India Company that was in charge of the postal transport between Europe and the African coast. In 1781, Senegal was made a colony of France, which increased communications between the two countries.

In 1850, the postal service was incorporated into a new organization and, in 1851, the postal transport between Gorée and Saint-Louis was transferred to people who crossed first the river and then the sea by simple pirogues.

The conquest of the colony's interior by Louis Faidherbe began in 1855. The French previously controlled trading posts only along the coast. Louis Faidherbe's conquest made a postal service necessary for official communication. Plans were put in place to set up telegraph lines throughout the country.

In 1879, the postal service was based on the French model.

By 1900, the principal centres of the postal service were all linked together. All principal centres, in turn, were connected to the capital. A system of telegraph lines covered almost the entire colony.

In 2024, the Senegalese government announced plans to revitalize La Poste, to modernize the company and address problems meeting customer demand. In May 2025, the CEO of La Poste, Maguette Kane announced in an interview that the company was in a critical financial situation that had severely worsened over the past several years.

=== Directors-General Since 1962 ===
• Ibrahima Ndiaye DG OPT from December 1962 to January 1973

• Ndaraw Cissé DG OPT from January 1973 to June 1976

• Mahady Diallo DG OPT from June 1976 to November 1978

• Assane Ndiaye DG OPT from November 1978 to November 1983

• El Hadj Malick Sy DG OPT/OPCE from November 1983 to June 1987

• Serigne Ahmadou Camara DG OPCE from June 1987 to December 1993

• Ibrahima Sarr DG OPCE from December 1993 to May 2000

• Iba Joseph Basse DG La Poste from May 2000 to August 2004

• Mamadou Thior DG La Poste from August 2004 to December 2013

• Siré Dia DG La Poste since January 2013
