= Niger Poste =

Niger Poste is the government organisation responsible for the postal service in Niger. Niger is a member of the West African Postal Conference.

In 2007, the Office National de la Poste et de l'Epargne was split into Poste Niger, which handles postal services, and Finaposte, which is in charge of financial services and was subsequently privatized. This was part of a larger privatization of some of Nigeria's communication industries.

== See also ==
- Communications in Niger
- Postage stamps and postal history of Niger
- List of national postal services#Africa
