= Angola–Benguela Front =

Frontal feature in the South Atlantic Ocean

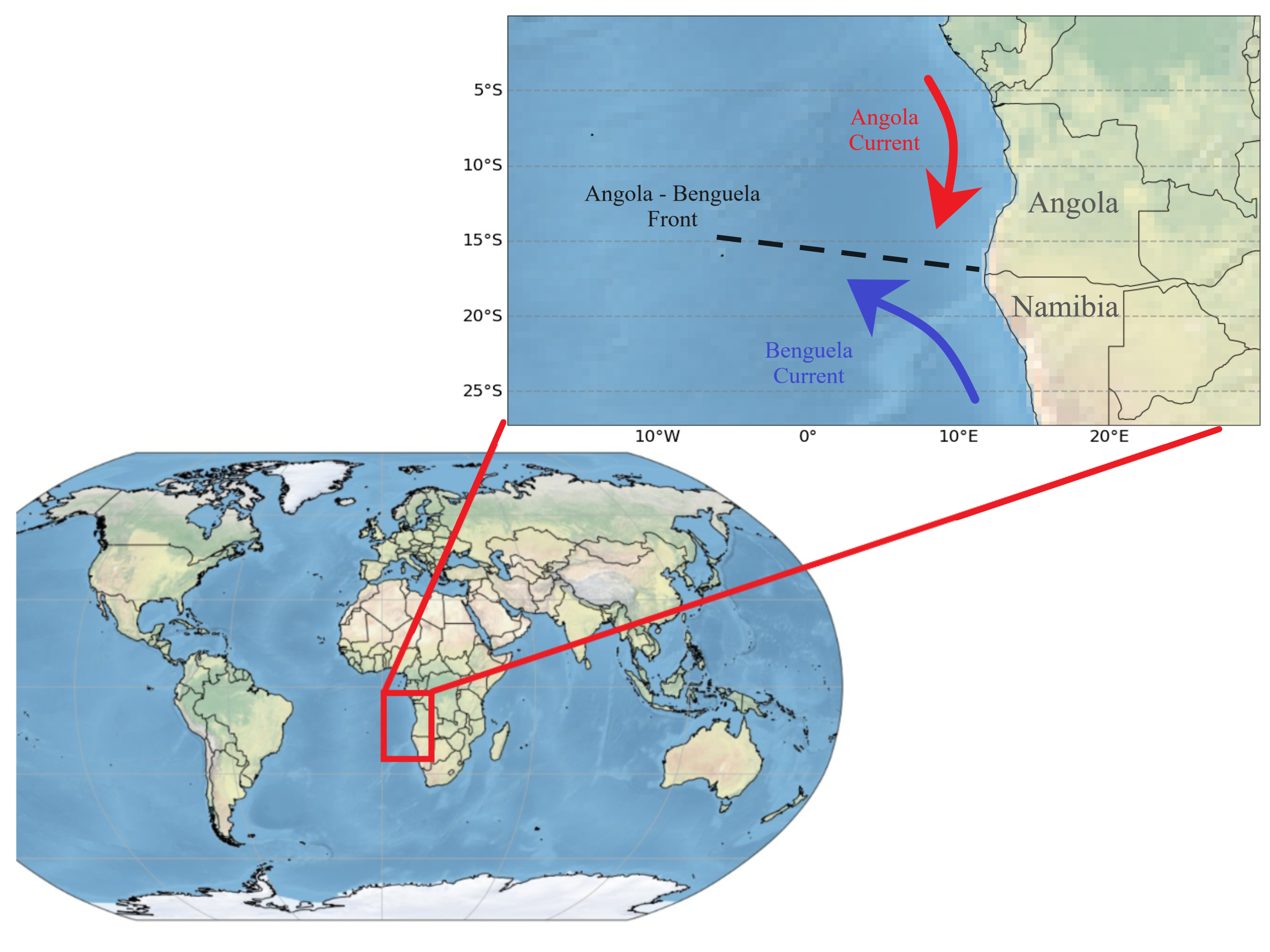
Location of the Angola - Benguela front. The course of the Angola Current (red) and the Benguela Current (blue) along the west coast of Africa are also indicated.

The Angola - Benguela front (ABF) is a permanent frontal feature situated between 15° and 17°S off the coast of Angola and Namibia, west Africa. It separates the saline, warm and nutrient-poor sea water of the Angola Current from the cold and nutrient-rich sea water associated with the Benguela Current.

In comparison to other major oceanic fronts created by the western boundary currents, the ABF is confined to a relatively narrow band of latitudes and is characterized by strong horizontal gradients in sea surface temperature and salinity. The ABF has a variable morphology, geographic location, and thermal characteristics. It plays an important role for the southern African continent due to its close proximity to the coast, having a significant impact on the local marine ecosystem and regional climate. Variability in position and intensity of the ABF has been suggested to affect local biology and thus fish stocks, as well as rainfall variability.

== History ==
The ABF was first named and described by Janke (1920) based on ship log data. However, consistent research on the front itself has only been conducted since the 1960s. It was Hart and Currie (1960) who first documented the existence of the Angola-Benguela front when the RRS William Scoresby sailed southwards surveying the Benguela Current off the west coast of Africa during the autumn and spring of 1950. They reported a sharp decrease in sea surface temperature from 27 to 20.5 °C within the span of one hour. In the early 1970s research increased steadily in this region with subsequent cruises revealing ocean circulation features of the area like the Angola Dome, and began to document the seasonal cycle of the ABF position.

During the past 20 years the cooperation between Angola, Namibia and other countries in Europe and Africa has been greatly improved through different projects and collaborations like the Enhancing Prediction of Tropical Atlantic Climate and its Impacts (PREFACE) (November 2013 - April 2018) and the Benguela Current Commission (BCC). The objective of these joint research projects has been to investigate and monitor the productivity and oceanographic processes and interactions within the region surrounding the ABF, aiming at improving the management of the fisheries and water resources.

== Physical properties ==
=== Horizontal and vertical structure ===
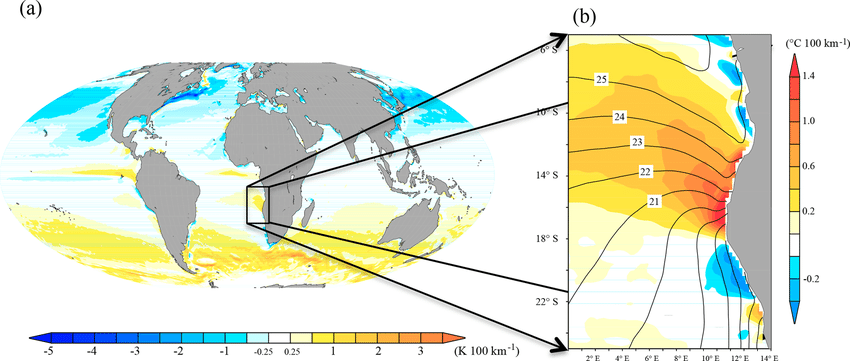
(a) Global image of observed 1982–2010 Optimum Interpolation Sea Surface Temperature (OISST). (b) Annual-mean Sea Surface Temperature (contour, °C) and its meridional gradient (°C per 100 km) around the ABF. Figure taken from Koseki et al. (2019)

The physical properties of the ABF have been studied by historic hydrographic data, satellite-derived sea surface temperature observations, in situ measurements and by model-based studies. All of the findings are in general agreement that the front is oriented normal to the coast and stretches offshore in a west to north-westerly direction between 15 and 17°S. The front has an average width of about 200 km, but it can be much narrower at certain times, with steeper temperature gradients. The average distance the front penetrates seawards from the coast is 250 km, but traces can be found up to 1000 km offshore. The region of the frontal zone was previously defined by a characteristic temperature gradient of between 1 °C per 28 km and 1 °C per 90 km. A more recent study calculated a meridional sea surface temperature gradient of 1 °C per 34 km (or 3 °C per 100 km) across the ABF in austral summer, whereas Colberg and Reason (2006) estimated ~4 °C per 100 km in the middle of the ABF. The sharpest temperature gradients are found within 250 km of the coast. Multiple sharp fronts can also occur, especially when the Angola Current is strongest in austral summer.

=== Driving forces controlling the development of the front ===
There are several assumptions about the most significant processes and driving forces controlling the development of the ABF. Many past studies suggest that the thermal characteristics of the front are influenced by a combination of factors. These include coastal orientation, bathymetry, movements of the South Atlantic Anticyclone, interaction between the south-flowing warm water of the Angola current and the north-flowing cold water of the Benguela current and the associated surface wind stress. However, Meeuwis and Lutjeharms (1990) concluded that the position of the front seems to be almost exclusively due to the opposing flows of the Angola Current and Benguela system. An alternate hypothesis, proposed by Shannon and Nelson (1996), suggests that wind stress is the most important mechanism for the maintenance of the front. Kostianoy and Lutjeharms (1999) found that short term changes in the ABF are correlated to variations of the pressure gradient driven by the South Atlantic Anticyclone.

In order to better understand the sensitivity of the position and intensity of the ABF to atmospheric forcing, Colberg and Reason (2006) were the first to attempt to model the front. They showed that the frontal position may be determined by the confluence of the northward and southward opposing flows, similar to what has been proposed by Meeuwis and Lutjeharms (1990). However, this confluence zone is primarily affected by the overlying atmospheric circulation. The strong anticyclonic wind stress curl of the region determines the motion of the South Equatorial Counter Current which causes the southward flow of the Angola Current. At the same time, the alongshore wind stress further to the south causes coastal upwelling resulting in the northward flow of the Benguela current. In the same study, Colberg and Reason found that the intensity of the ABF is tied to the strength of the meridional wind field which determines the coastal upwelling. However, even though the ABF is influenced by the intensity and location of the trade winds, the effect is not linear.

=== Seasonal cycle ===
The ABF is characterized by a typical seasonal cycle with meridional frontal movements and changes in the cross-thermal gradient. Previous studies found that the front is most distinct, widest and has steeper meridional sea surface temperature (SST) gradients in austral summer (summer in the Southern Hemisphere), when it reaches its southernmost position. Whereas in austral winter it is less intense, and it reaches its northernmost position.

The core of the ABF, which is considered as the region of steepest temperature gradients within the frontal zone, remains very steady throughout the year and always lies between 17 and 15°S (mean location 16.4°S). Mean temperatures at the core of the frontal zone are 20.7 °C in austral summer and 18.0 °C in austral winter. The front exists between 15.5 and 17°S in the austral summer with more intense temperature gradients (~1 °C per 34 km), while in the austral winter it lies between 15.5 and 17°S with weaker temperature gradients (1 °C per 40 km). The northern and southern boundaries of the frontal zone appear to fluctuate out of phase: as the northern boundary moves southwards in the austral winter, the southern boundary is displaced northwards. The converse is true for austral summer.

=== Benguela Niño ===
Apart from seasonal and mesoscale features, interannual fluctuations of the ABF are also significant and cause great temporal and spatial variability in the frontal zone. Minor warm and cold interannual anomalies have been observed throughout the record and appear to develop regularly in the ABF. However, a particular phenomenon and the most significant interannual signal that can be encountered in the frontal region is the Benguela Niño event. The inverse of a Benguela Niño is called Benguela Niña.

Like the well-known El Niño phenomenon in the South Pacific, these events are characterised by an intense and unusual warming of the surface layer at the coast of Namibia, with positive SST anomalies reaching up to 4 °C. However, Benguela Niño events are less intense and less frequent than Pacific El Niños. They are observed with an interval of 7 to 11 years and are associated with a southward intrusion of warm and saline Angolan water into the northern Benguela. Benguela Niño tend to reach their maximum in late austral summer mainly during March–April. There have been major, well-documented Benguela Niño events in 1934, 1950, 1964, 1974, 1984, 1995, 1999 and 2010.

During a Benguela Niño, the Angola-Benguela front is abnormally displaced to a southern position, causing a reduced upwelling intensity at the coast and the advection of warm, highly saline water as far as 25°S. Two main forcing mechanisms responsible for this interannual variability of the Angola-Benguela frontal zone are considered but are still under debate. These are the local atmospheric forcing and the connection with the equatorial variability. On the one hand, some studies have shown that temperature and upwelling anomalies are caused by local wind changes related to the magnitude and location of South Atlantic Anticyclone. On the other hand, past studies indicated that, rather than being triggered by variation in local wind-stress, the Benguela Niño is associated with large-scale remote changes in the wind patterns. More specifically, remote forcing is caused by a sudden relaxation of the trade winds in the western or central equatorial Atlantic. This generates equatorial Kelvin waves which propagate eastward along the Atlantic equator until the African coast where one part of their energy is reflected back to the west as equatorial Rossby waves. Another part of their energy is transmitted poleward along the west coast of Africa as coastal trapped waves influencing the temperature variability.

== See also ==
- Front (oceanography)
- Benguela Current
- Angola Current
