= Bakassi =

Peninsula on the Gulf of Guinea

- LGA
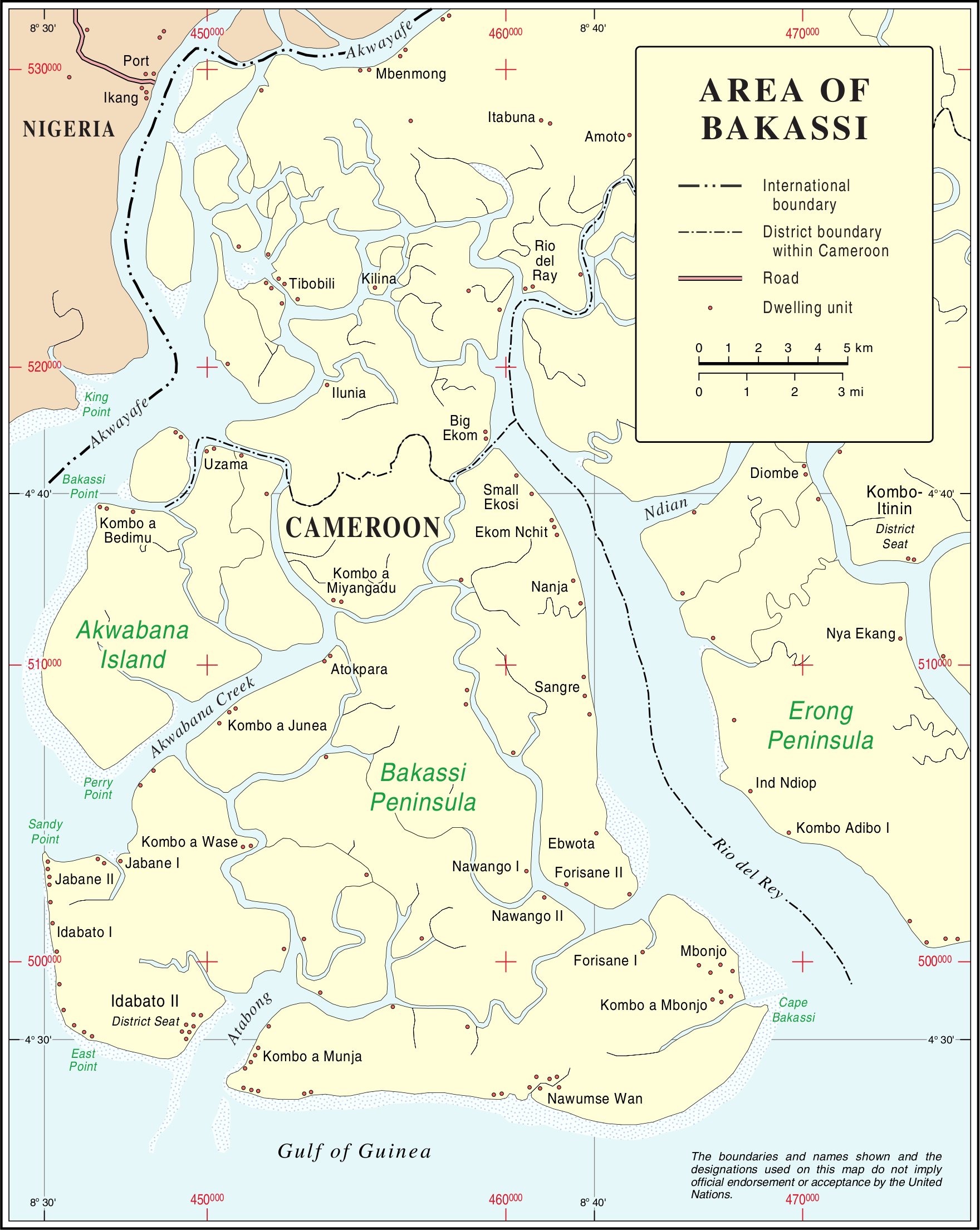
- Bakassi
- Interactive map of Bakassi
- Location within Cameroon
- Country: Cameroon
- Region: South West Region

Area
  - Total: 665 km^{2} (257 sq mi)

Population
  - Total: 150,000 - 300,000
- Time zone: UTC+1 (WAT)

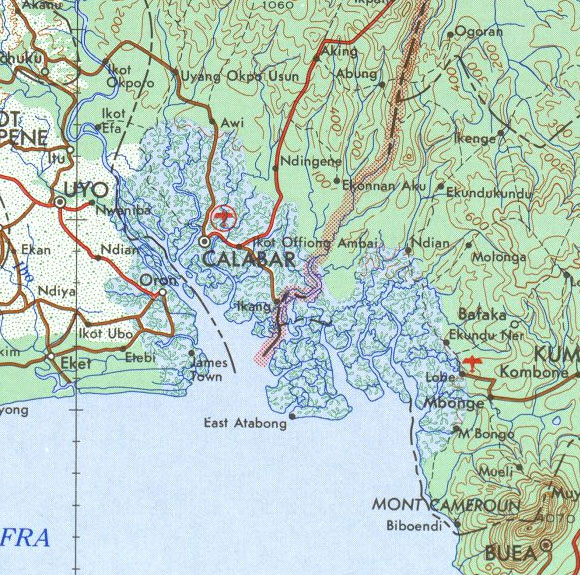
The Nigeria-Cameroon border region on the coast from a 1963 map, with Bakassi peninsula in the middle

Bakassi is a peninsula on the Gulf of Guinea. It lies between the Cross River estuary, near the city of Calabar and the Rio del Ray estuary on the east. It is governed by Cameroon, following the transfer of sovereignty from neighbouring Nigeria as a result of a judgment by the International Court of Justice. On 22 November 2007, the Nigerian Senate rejected the transfer, since the Greentree Agreement ceding the area to Cameroon was contrary to Section 12(1) of the 1999 Constitution. Regardless, the territory was completely ceded to Cameroon on 14 August 2008, exactly two years after the first part of it was transferred.

== Geography and economy ==
The peninsula lies between latitudes 4°25′ and 5°10′N and longitudes 8°20′ and 9°08′E . It consists of a number of low-lying, largely mangrove covered islands covering an area of around 665 km^{2} (257 sq mi). The population of Bakassi is the subject of some dispute, but is generally put at between 150,000 and 300,000 people.

Bakassi is situated at the extreme eastern end of the Gulf of Guinea, where the warm east-flowing Guinea Current (called Aya Efiat in Efik) meets the cold north-flowing Benguela Current (called Aya Ubenekang in Efik). These two ocean currents interact, creating huge foamy breakers which constantly advance towards the shore. This builds up shoals rich in fish, shrimps, and a wide variety of other marine life forms, thus making the area a very fertile fishing ground, from which most of the population make their living.

The peninsula is commonly described as "oil-rich", though in fact no commercially viable deposits of oil have been discovered. However, the area has aroused considerable interest from oil companies in the light of the discovery of rich reserves of high grade crude oil in Nigeria. At least eight multinational oil companies have participated in the exploration of the peninsula and its offshore waters. In October 2012, China Petroleum & Chemical Corporation announced it had discovered new oil and gas resources in the Bakassi region.

The Bakassi local government area is made up of a number of low-lying islands and is located inside the Gulf of Guinea. The Bakassi deep sea port and the Bakassi peninsula make up the region. The average annual temperature of Bakassi LGA, which has a total size of 665 square kilometers or 257 square miles, is 25 degrees Celsius or 77 degrees Fahrenheit. The average speed in Bakassi LGA is 12 km/h (7.5 mph), while the area's humidity level is estimated to be 94%.

== History ==
During the Scramble for Africa, Queen Victoria signed a Treaty of Protection with the King and Chiefs of Akwa Akpa, known to Europeans as Old Calabar, on 10 September 1884. This enabled the British Empire to exercise control over the entire territory around Calabar, including Bakassi. The territory subsequently became de facto part of Nigeria, although the border was never permanently delineated. However, documents released by the Cameroonians, in parity with that of the British and Germans, clearly places Bakassi under Cameroonian Territory as a consequence of colonial era Anglo-German agreements. After Southern Cameroons voted in 1961 to leave Nigeria and became a part of Cameroon, Bakassi remained under Calabar administration in Nigeria until ICJ judgement of 2002.

== Population ==
Bakassi inhabitants are mainly the Oron people, the people of Cross River State and Akwa Ibom State of Nigeria.

== Territorial dispute ==
Nigeria and Cameroon have disputed the possession of Bakassi for some years, leading to considerable tension between the two countries. In 1981 the two countries went to the brink of war over Bakassi and another area around Lake Chad, at the other end of the two countries' common border. More armed clashes broke out in the early 1990s. In response, Cameroon took the matter to the International Court of Justice (ICJ) on 29 March 1994.

The case was extremely complex, requiring the court to review diplomatic exchanges dating back over 100 years. Nigeria relied largely on Anglo-German correspondence dating from 1885 as well as treaties between the colonial powers and the indigenous rulers in the area, particularly the 1884 Treaty of Protection. Cameroon pointed to the Anglo-German treaty of 1913, which defined sphere of control in the region, as well as two agreements signed in the 1970s between Cameroon and Nigeria. These were the Yaoundé II Declaration of 4 April 1971 and the Maroua Declaration of 1 June 1975, which were devised to outline maritime boundaries between the two countries following their independence. The line was drawn through the Cross River estuary to the west of the peninsula, thereby implying Cameroonian ownership over Bakassi. However, Nigeria never ratified the agreement, while Cameroon regarded it as being in force.

=== ICJ verdict ===
The ICJ delivered its judgment on 10 October 2002, finding (based principally on the Anglo-German agreements) that sovereignty over Bakassi did indeed rest with Cameroon. It instructed Nigeria to transfer possession of the peninsula, but did not require the inhabitants to move or to change their nationality. Cameroon was thus given a substantial Nigerian population and was required to protect their rights, infrastructure and welfare.

The verdict caused consternation in Nigeria. It aroused vitriolic comments from Nigerian officials and the Nigerian media alike. Chief Richard Akinjide, a former Nigerian Attorney-General and Minister of Justice who had been a leading member of Nigeria's legal team, described the decision as "50% international law and 50% international politics", "blatantly biased and unfair", "a total disaster", and a "complete fraud". The Nigerian newspaper The Guardian went further, declaring that the judgment was "a rape and unforeseen potential international conspiracy against Nigerian territorial integrity and sovereignty" and "part of a Western ploy to foment and perpetuate trouble in Africa". The outcome of the controversy was a de facto Nigerian refusal to withdraw its troops from Bakassi and transfer sovereignty. The Nigerian government did not, however, openly reject the judgment but instead called for an agreement that would provide "peace with honour, with the interest and welfare of our people".

The ICJ judgement was backed up by the United Nations, whose charter potentially allowed sanctions or even the use of force to enforce the court's ruling. Secretary-General Kofi Annan stepped in as a mediator and chaired a tripartite summit with the two countries' presidents on 15 November 2002, which established a commission to facilitate the peaceful implementation of the ICJ's judgement. A further summit was held on 31 January 2004. This made significant progress, but the process was complicated by the opposition of Bakassi's inhabitants to being transferred to Cameroon.

Flag used by Bakassian separatists

Bakassian leaders threatened to seek independence if Nigeria renounced sovereignty. This secession was announced on 9 July 2006, as the "Democratic Republic of Bakassi". The decision was reportedly made at a meeting on 2 July 2006 and The Vanguard newspaper of Nigeria reported the decision to secede. The decision was reportedly made by groups of militants including Southern Cameroons under the aegis of Southern Cameroons Peoples Organisation (SCAPO), Bakassi Movement for Self-Determination (BAMOSD), and the Movement for the Emancipation of the Niger Delta (MEND). The Biafra separatist group, Biafra Nations League (BNL), initially known as Biafra Nations Youth League, led by Princewill Chimezie Richard (known as Prince Obuka) and Ebuta Akor Takon (not the former Deputy, Ebuta Ogar Takon) moved their operational base to the peninsula, after series of warnings to the Nigeria government over the plight of the internally displaced natives and the reported killing of remnants in the peninsula by Cameroon forces. This came amid clashes between Nigerian troops and the Bakassi Strike Force, a militant group that focused on attacking Nigerian and Cameroon forces. BNL Leaders were later apprehended in the Ikang-Cameroon border area on 9 November 2016 by Nigerian troops according to the Nigeria nation newspaper; reports linked the Biafra group to the militant groups. BNL demanded that oil companies authorized to drill for oil by Nigeria and Cameroon leave the maritime boundary area of Bakassi Peninsula. The group also threatened to attack Cameroon Forces.

=== Resolution ===
On 13 June 2006, President Olusegun Obasanjo of Nigeria and President Paul Biya of Cameroon resolved the dispute in talks led by UN Secretary General Kofi Annan in New York City. Obasanjo agreed to withdraw Nigerian troops within 60 days and to leave the territory completely in Cameroonian control within the next two years. Annan said, "With today's agreement on the Bakassi peninsula, a comprehensive resolution of the dispute is within our grasp. The momentum achieved must be sustained."

=== Nigerian withdrawal and low-level insurgency ===
Nigeria began to withdraw its forces, comprising some 3,000 troops, beginning 1 August 2006, and a ceremony on 14 August marked the formal handover of the northern part of the peninsula. The remainder stayed under Nigerian civil authority for two more years.

On 22 November 2007, the Nigerian Senate passed a resolution declaring that the withdrawal from the Bakassi Peninsula was illegal. The government took no action, and handed the final parts of Bakassi over to Cameroon on 14 August 2008 as planned, but a Federal High Court had stated this should be delayed until all accommodations for resettled Bakassians had been settled; the government did not seem to plan to heed this court order, and set the necessary mechanisms into motion to override it. Fishermen displaced from Bakassi were first settled in a landlocked area called New Bakassi, which they claimed was already inhabited and not suitable for fishermen like them but only for farmers. The displaced people were then moved to Akpabuyo, and eventually established a new community of Dayspring.

Despite the formal handover of Bakassi by Nigeria to Cameroon in 2006, the territory of Bakassi is still mentioned as part of the 774 local governments in Nigeria as embodied in the First Schedule, Part I of the 1999 Constitution of the Federal Republic of Nigeria, 1999. After the Nigerian 2015 general elections, Nigeria's 8th National Assembly still accommodates the Calabar-South/Akpabuyo/Bakassi Federal Constituency represented by Hon. Essien Ekpeyong Ayi of the People's Democratic Party.

In the 2010s and 2020s, Biafran separatists, most importantly Biafra Nations League, still continue a low-level militant resistance against Cameroon in regards to Bakassi.

== See also ==
- Bakassi conflict
