= Dayspring =

Dayspring or DaySpring or Day spring may refer to:

- The dawn, break of day
- Dayspring, Nigeria, a community in Cross River State, Nigeria
- Dayspring, Nova Scotia, a community in Lunenburg County, Nova Scotia
- Day Spring (Utah), a spring in Utah
- Dellingr, the Norse god, father of Dagr (Day)
- Dayspring or DaySpring, a recording label of Word Records
- DaySpring, a subsidiary of Hallmark Cards
- Dayspring, a centre for spiritual growth founded by Sue Mosteller
- Dayspring, a 1945 novel by Harry Sylvester
- Dayspring, a 2024 novel by Anthony Oliveira
- Dayspring, a magazine published by the Bahá'í UK National Assembly, see Bahá'í literature
- Dayspring, a fishing smack sunk in World War I List of shipwrecks in May 1918#26 May
- Dayspring, a 36 ft Bermuda sloop owned by Morning Star Trust

== See also ==
- Dayspring Airpark outside Bridgewater, Nova Scotia
- The Dayspring, a 1903 novel by William Francis Barry

=== Comic book characters ===
- Aliya Dayspring, a comicbook character
- Niles Dayspring, List of Amalgam Comics characters
- Tyler Dayspring, a comicbook character
