= Alioum =

Alioum is both a surname and a given name. Notable people with the name include:

- Sidi Alioum (born 1982), Cameroonian football referee
- Alioum Boukar (born 1972), Cameroonian footballer
- Alioum Moussa (born 1977), Cameroonian graphic designer and illustrator
- Alioum Saidou (born 1978), Cameroonian footballer
- Saidou Alioum (born 2003), Cameroonian footballer
