= Maroua Declaration =

1975 maritime boundary agreement between Cameroon and Nigeria

- Type: Boundary delimitation
- Signed: 1 June 1975
- Location: Maroua, Cameroon
- Effective: 1 June 1975
- Parties: Cameroon; Nigeria
- Languages: English; French

The Maroua Declaration is a 1975 maritime boundary agreement between Cameroon and Nigeria. A question regarding the validity of the agreement arose during an International Court of Justice case that decided a boundary dispute between the two countries.

The Maroua Declaration was signed on 1 June 1975 by Ahmadou Ahidjo, President of Cameroon, and Yakubu Gowon, the head of state of Nigeria in Maroua, Cameroon. The agreement extends a maritime boundary that previously existed between the two countries further into the Gulf of Guinea from the mouth of the Akwayafe River.

In 2002, the International Court of Justice issued a judgment in a case between Cameroon and Nigeria on their longstanding boundary dispute. Nigeria argued that the Maroua Declaration was invalid and nonbinding because although the Nigerian head of state had signed it, the agreement had not been ratified either by Parliament or any other governmental process. The ICJ held that under international law the declaration was valid and came into effect upon signing by the head of state.
