= Passerelle de Bessengué =

Artwork in Douala, Cameroon

Passerelle de Bessengue
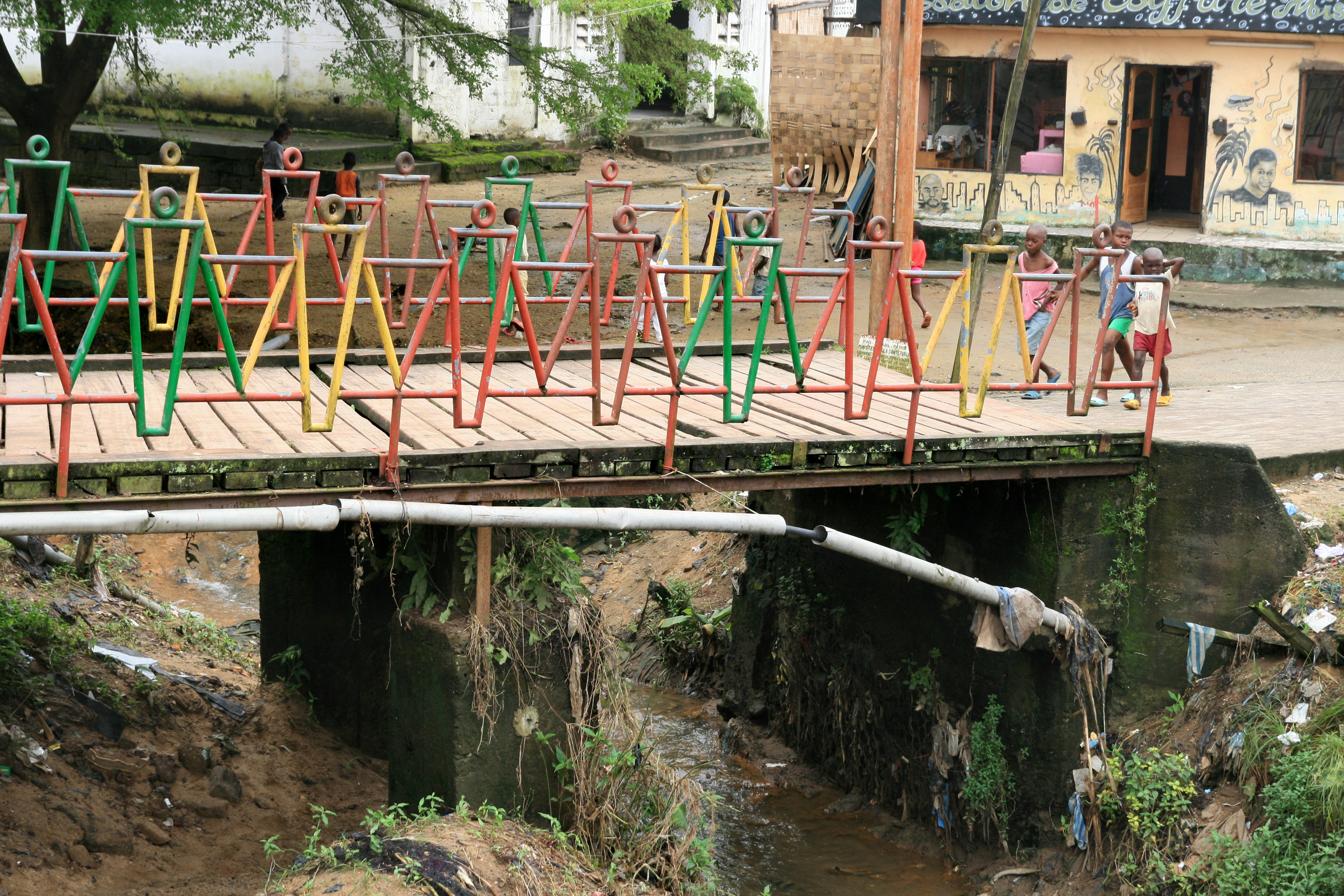
- Artist: Alioum Moussa
- Year: 2005
- Dimensions: 1,26 m × 4,92 m × 9 m (5,000 in × 19,400 in × 350 in)
- Location: entrance of the Vallée Bessengue, Bessengue-Akwa Douala, Cameroon; 4.05532°N 9.707129°E

The Passerelle de Bessengue is an artwork in Douala (Cameroon). It is a wooden bridge with an iron handrail, painted in different colors, each one representing people of different ethnic groups holding hands. It was inaugurated during the Salon Urbain de Douala en 2007.

== The artwork ==
The Passerelle de Bessengue is a wooden bridge with an iron handrail, painted in different colors, each one representing people of different ethnic groups holding hands. La Passerelle was designed by the Cameroonian artist Alioum Moussa. It was initially conceived as a cooperation development project funded by the Institut Régional de Coopération-Développement d’Alsace (Ircod-Alsace), the Municipality of Douala I, and doual’art. As project coordinator, doual’art ran a community-based approach involving the local Development Community of Bessengue-Akwa (CDBA) from the conceptualization phase to the project production.

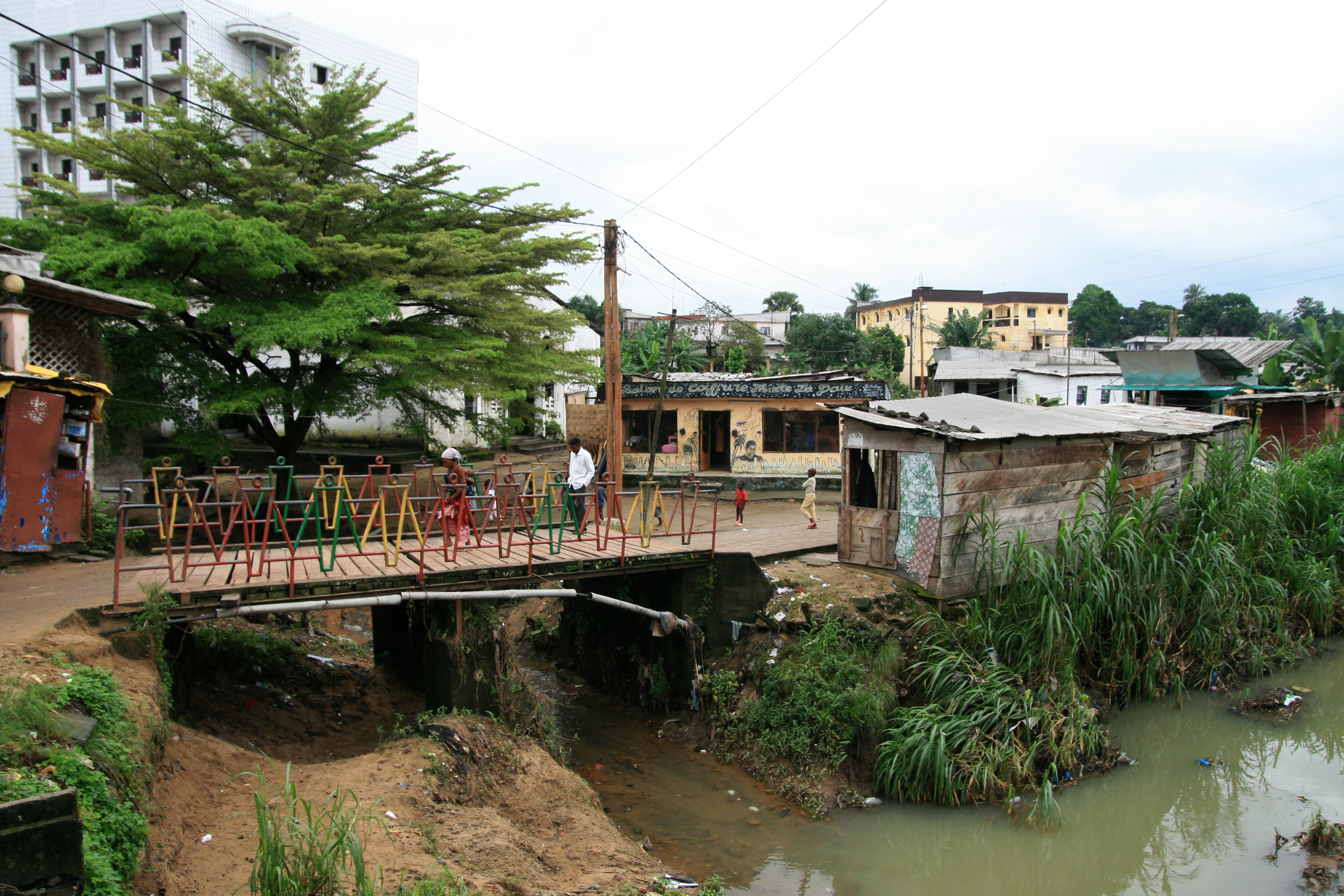

During the process, an artistic contest was organized in order to provide La Passerelle with aesthetical features. On five projects submitted, the selection fell on Alioum Moussa. His proposal aroused among the community a critical discussion and self-reflection about historical conflicts among autochthonous and non-native populations. The success of the project by Moussa was to create a link between art and community experiences, documenting shared intentions to promote and pursue a peaceful collaboration for future generations. La Passerelle was officially inaugurated during the SUD 2007 and restored two times. In 2009, Malika Ouedraogo and Cecile Demessine repainted the handrail. In the occasion of the SUD 2013, the Municipality of Douala funded the replacement of a handrail side and some broken wood planches.

La Passerelle has disclosed the block 1 of Bessengue to one of the busiest roads of Douala, facilitating the circulation of people, vehicles, and the provision of public services. Its position at the entrance of the neighborhood has contributed to create a square between La Passerelle and the first houses. This area, commonly known as Vallée Bessengue, has become an important landmark for children, young people and women who meet there to play, to date and to shop, surrounded by other art installations.

== See also ==
=== Bibliography ===
- Pensa, Iolanda (Ed.) 2017. Public Art in Africa. Art et transformations urbaines à Douala /// Art and Urban Transformations in Douala. Genève: Metis Presses. ISBN 978-2-94-0563-16-6
- Babina, L., and Douala Bell, M. (eds.). (2007): Douala in Translation. A View of the City and Its Creative Transformative Potentials, Rotterdam, Episode Publishers.
- Pucciarelli, M. (2015). «Culture and Safety in Douala: The Cases of New Bell and Bessengue », in Bonini Lessing, E. (ed.), Urban Safety and Security, Franco Angeli, pp- 69-79.
- Verschuren, K., X. Nibbeling and L. Grandin. (2012): Making Douala 2007-2103, Rotterdam, ICU art project.
- Van Der Lan, B. and Jenkins R.S. (eds) (2011). Douala: Intertwined Architectures, The Netherland: ArchiAfrica Pensa, I. (2012):
- «Public Art and Urban Change in Douala». In Domus, (7 April 2012). http://www.domusweb.it/en/art/2012/04/09/public-art-and-urban-change-in-douala.html
- Van der Lans, B. (2013): «Best practices in culture-based urban development». In David Adjaye and Simon Njami (Eds) Visionary Africa: Art & architecture at work (III Ed.). Brussels, European Commission and Centre for Fine Arts (bozar).
- Greenberg, K. (2012): «La ville en tant que site: création d’un public pour l’art contemporain en Afrique». In Carson Chan, Nadim Samman (Eds.) Higher Atlas / Au-delà de l’Atlas – The Marrakech Biennale [4] in Context. Sternberg Press
- Lettera 27, (2013): «Trasformazioni urbane: l’edizione 2013 di SUD, a Douala» In Lettera 27.
- Marta Pucciarelli (2014) Final Report. University of Applied Sciences and Arts of Southern Switzerland, Laboratory of visual culture.

=== Related articles ===
- List of public art in Douala
- Contemporary African art
