= Alioum Moussa =

Cameroonian artist (born 1977)

- Born: 1977; Maroua (Cameroon)
- Notable work: The La passerelle de Bessengue (Douala)
- Style: designer

Alioum Moussa, born in 1977 in Maroua (Cameroon), is a graphic designer and illustrator by training. He lives and works in Yaoundé (Cameroon).

== Biography ==
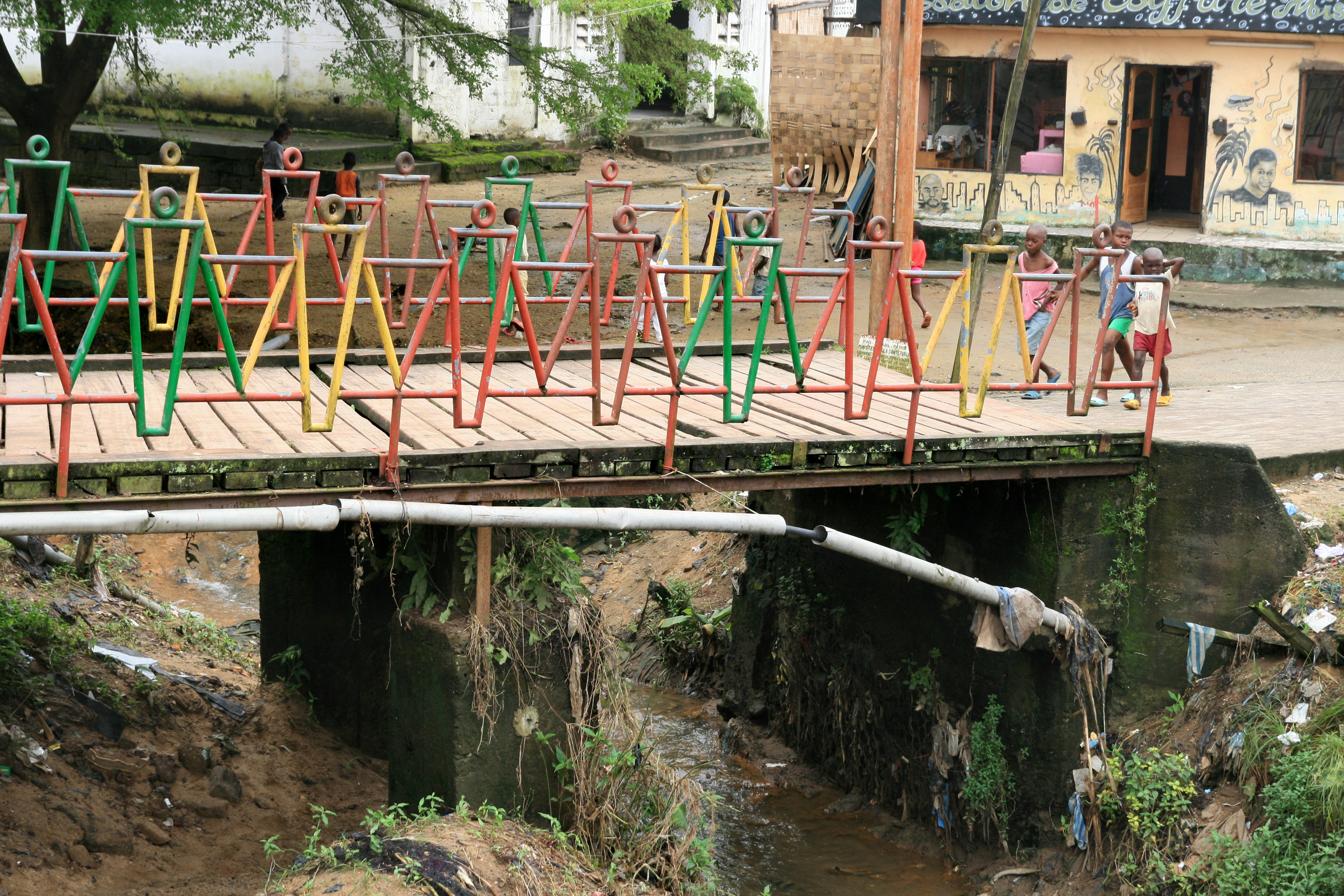
La passerelle de Bessengue, Douala.

A self-taught visual artist, Alioum Moussa expresses himself through several media: primarily in painting but also performance, installation and assemblages of objects. In recent years, he has been experimenting with theatrical scenery. His career began in 1993, when he won the award for best Cameroonian artisan at a competition organized by the Ministry of Commerce. He has been honing himself through varied workshops in different parts of the world and at many residencies, IAAB (Basel, Switzerland) in 2006, to the University of Ideas, organized by the Pistoletto Foundation (Biella, Italy) in 2010. He received an artist’s visa from AFAA/Culturesfrance in 2007. In 2010, he won the Illy contest and his design was selected to decorate coffee canisters on display and for sale. His gaze is filled with humor for the human being and the apparent monotony of being that masks its facetious figures. Over time his gaze has sharpened more and more on political themes, questioning the role of Africa in globalization.

Moussa works with the materials he finds, whether acrylics or mud. His latest explorations are based on the recycling of textiles, wax print fabrics or cotton clothing (T-shirts). By using second hand clothing as his principle medium, Moussa takes a stand against Africa being the dumping grounds of the industrial fashion world. “I’m talking about the manipulation of the thrift store circuit. Second hand clothing plays an important role in the economy, the purchasing power. (...) The hidden face of the thrift store (...) kind of translates into the relations between the West and Africa.”

== Bibliography ==
- Africultures, Alioum Moussa.
- Gilvin, A. (2015): Games of Seduction and Games of History: Alioum Moussa’s Fashion Victims in Niamey, Niger. Cambridge University Press. http://journals.cambridge.org/action/displayAbstract?fromPage=online&aid=9593720;DOI: https://dx.doi.org/10.1017/asr.2015.4
- Siegenthaler, F. (2006). Alioum Moussa à l’atelier IAAB, (Bâle) 2006. [online] Alioum Moussa. Available at: [Accessed 21 Nov. 2016].
- Pensa, Iolanda (Ed.) 2017. Public Art in Africa. Art et transformations urbaines à Douala /// Art and Urban Transformations in Douala. Genève: Metis Presses. ISBN 978-2-94-0563-16-6

=== See also ===
- List of public art in Douala
