= Angola Current =

Temporary ocean surface current

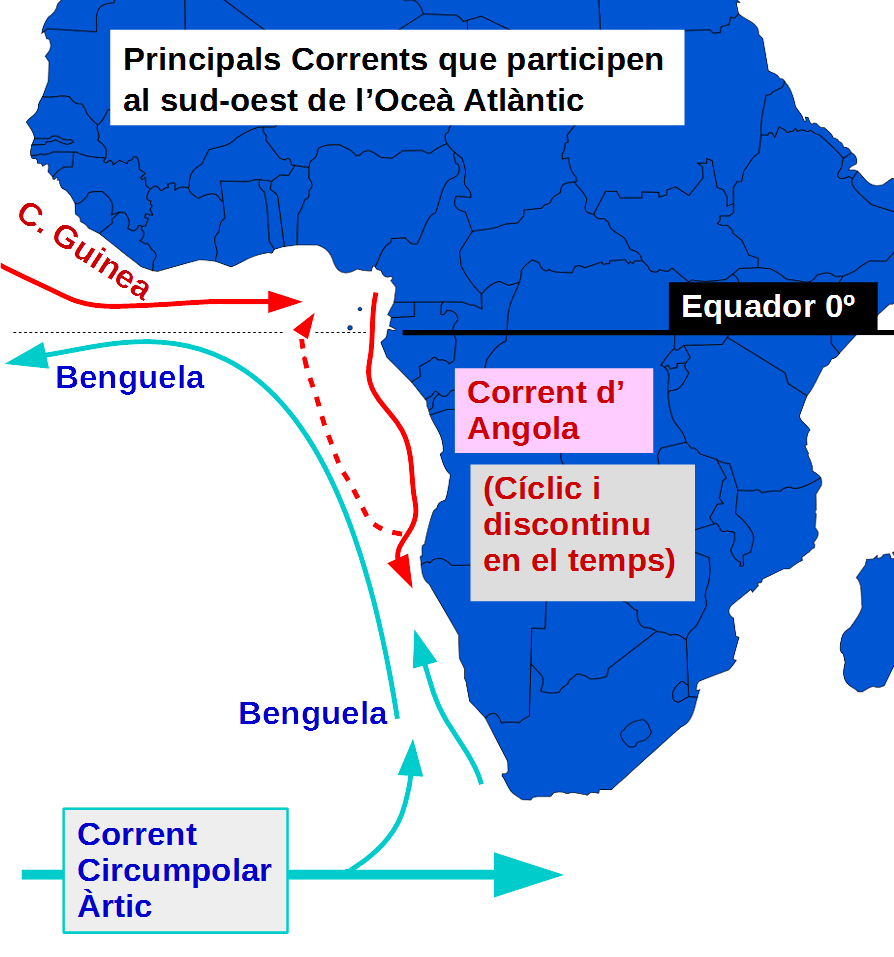

Angola current is a temporary ocean surface current. It is an extension of the Guinea Current, flowing near western Africa's coast. It is known to have created similar effects in the upwelling as El Niño, though its effect is weaker.

== See also ==
- Ocean current
- Oceanic gyres
