= Maroua =

Regional capital in Cameroon

- City
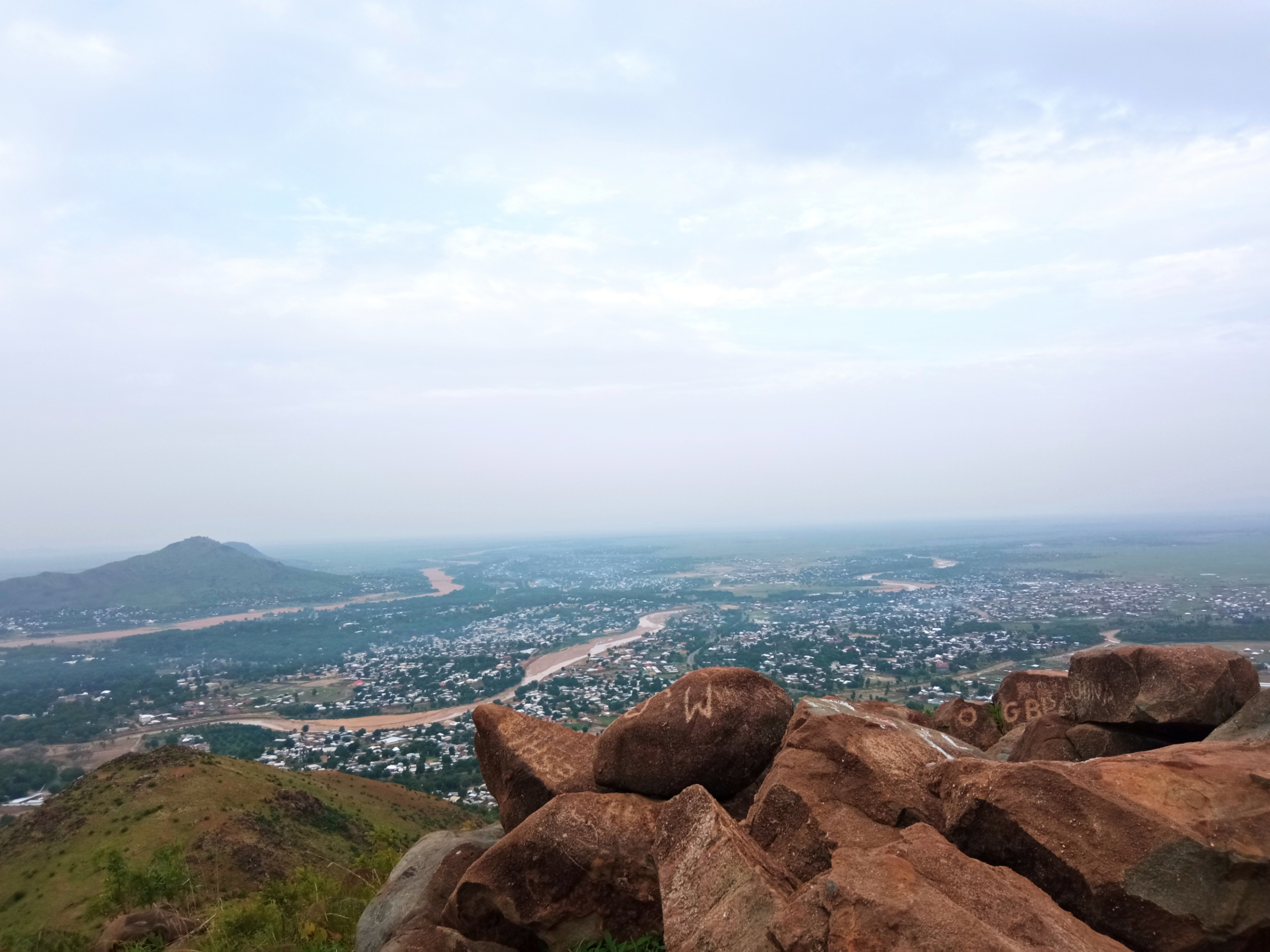
- Overlooking Maroua

- Location in Cameroon
- Coordinates: 10°35′50″N 14°18′57″E
- Country: Cameroon
- Province: Far North
- Department: Diamaré
- Elevation: 384 m (1,260 ft)

Population (2005)
  - Total: 201,371
- Time zone: UTC+01:00 (WAT)
- Area code: 00237

Maroua (Fula: Marwa, مَرْوَ, 𞤥𞤢𞤪𞤱𞤢) is the capital of the Far North Region of Cameroon, stretching along the banks of the Ferngo and Kaliao Rivers, in the foothills of the Mandara Mountains. The city had 201,371 inhabitants at the 2005 census, consisting mainly of the Fulbe/Fulani ethnic group.

== History ==
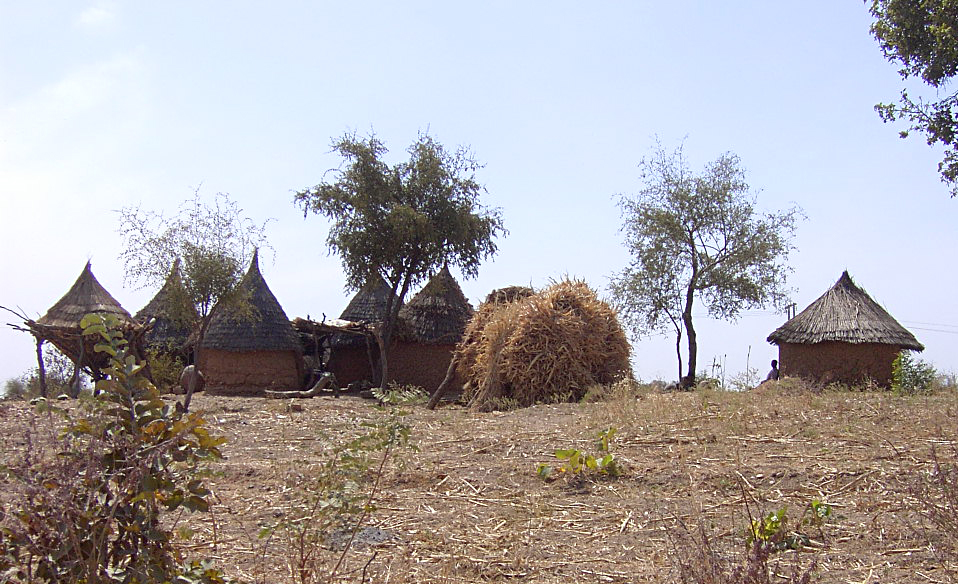
Matakam dwellings near Maroua, Far North Region, Cameroon

The city was occupied by the Guiziga in the 17th century and the Mofu in the 18th century.

The Maroua Declaration, a maritime boundary agreement between Nigeria and Cameroon, was signed in Maroua on 1 June 1975.

== Economy ==
Embroidery, leather goods, jewelry, pottery are the important economic activities in the city of Maroua.

== Transport ==
The city also has the Maroua Salak Airport.

== Education ==
The University of Maroua is based in the city.

== Places of worship ==
Among the places of worship, they are predominantly Muslim mosques. There are also Christian churches and temples: Roman Catholic Diocese of Maroua–Mokolo (Catholic Church), Evangelical Church of Cameroon (World Communion of Reformed Churches), Presbyterian Church in Cameroon (World Communion of Reformed Churches), Cameroon Baptist Convention (Baptist World Alliance), Full Gospel Mission Cameroon (Assemblies of God).

== Climate ==
The climate is Sahelian, being hot and dry for most of the year. Köppen-Geiger climate classification system classifies its climate as hot semi-arid (BSh).

Climate data for Maroua
Month	Jan	Feb	Mar	Apr	May	Jun	Jul	Aug	Sep	Oct	Nov	Dec	Year
Mean daily maximum °C (°F)	31.9 (89.4)	34.9 (94.8)	38.3 (100.9)	40.0 (104.0)	37.8 (100.0)	34.6 (94.3)	31.6 (88.9)	30.5 (86.9)	32.0 (89.6)	34.8 (94.6)	34.6 (94.3)	32.6 (90.7)	34.5 (94.1)
Daily mean °C (°F)	24.5 (76.1)	27.3 (81.1)	30.8 (87.4)	32.6 (90.7)	31.3 (88.3)	28.9 (84.0)	26.8 (80.2)	26.0 (78.8)	26.7 (80.1)	28.3 (82.9)	27.2 (81.0)	25.0 (77.0)	27.9 (82.2)
Mean daily minimum °C (°F)	17.1 (62.8)	19.7 (67.5)	23.4 (74.1)	25.6 (78.1)	24.9 (76.8)	23.1 (73.6)	21.9 (71.4)	21.5 (70.7)	21.4 (70.5)	21.3 (70.3)	19.6 (67.3)	17.4 (63.3)	21.4 (70.5)
Average precipitation mm (inches)	0.0 (0.0)	0.0 (0.0)	16.8 (0.66)	18.5 (0.73)	62.7 (2.47)	102.7 (4.04)	197.4 (7.77)	235.2 (9.26)	131.4 (5.17)	25.5 (1.00)	0.0 (0.0)	0.0 (0.0)	790.2 (31.11)
Average precipitation days (≥ 1.0 mm)	0	0	0	3	7	10	16	18	13	4	0	0	71
Mean monthly sunshine hours	286.0	266.4	275.8	246.6	253.2	225.4	193.4	191.1	208.3	257.8	286.4	297.8	2,988.2
Source: NOAA

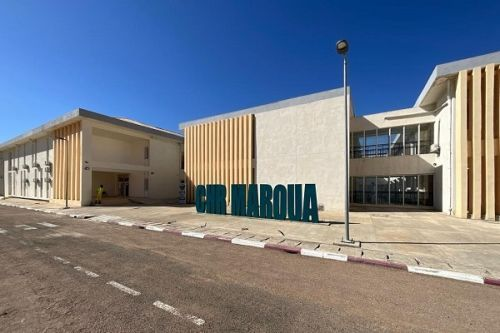
General Hospital of Maroua

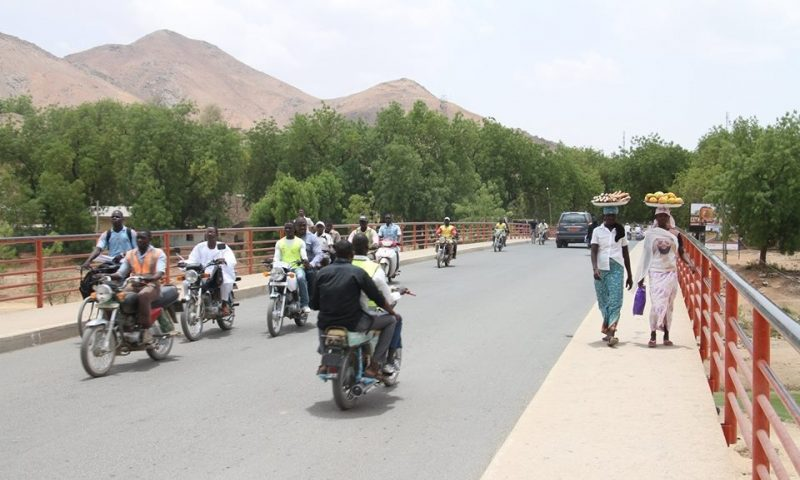
A bridge in Maroua

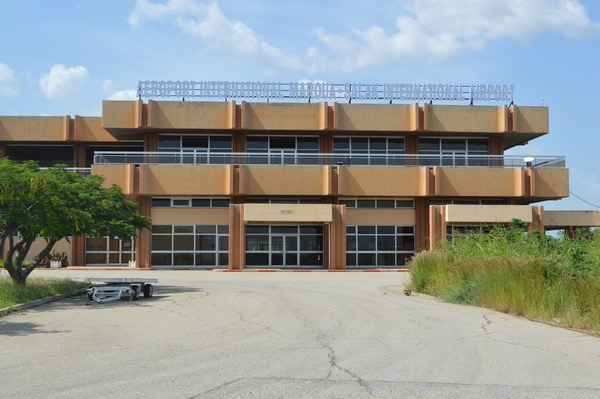
aroua Salak airport

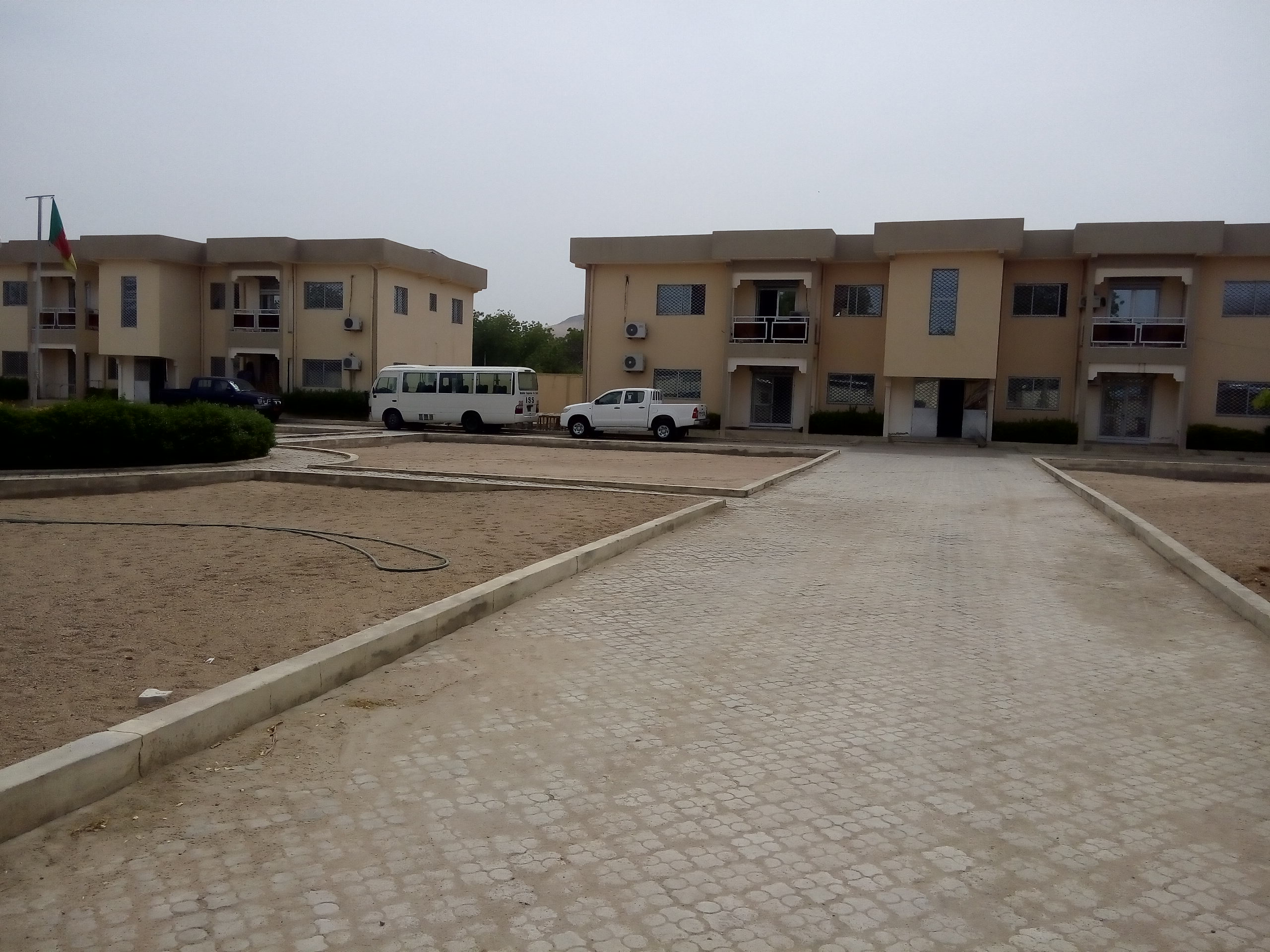
Rectorate University of Maroua

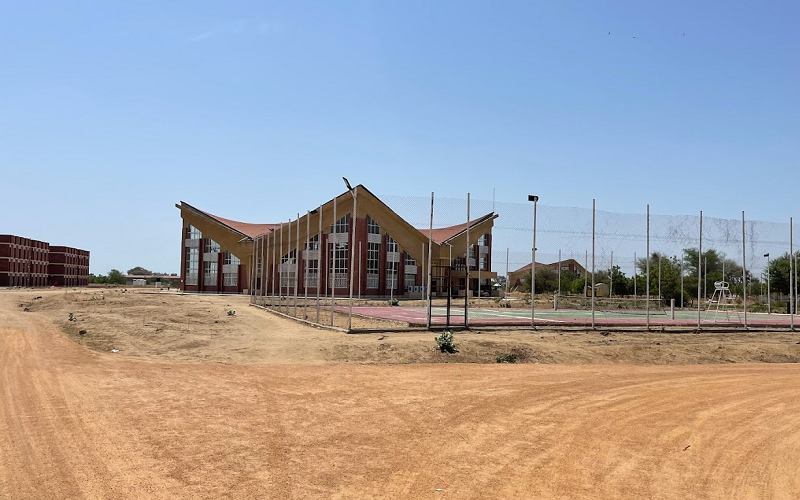
another view of Maroua University

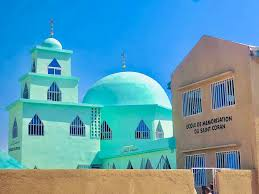
Mosque in Maroua

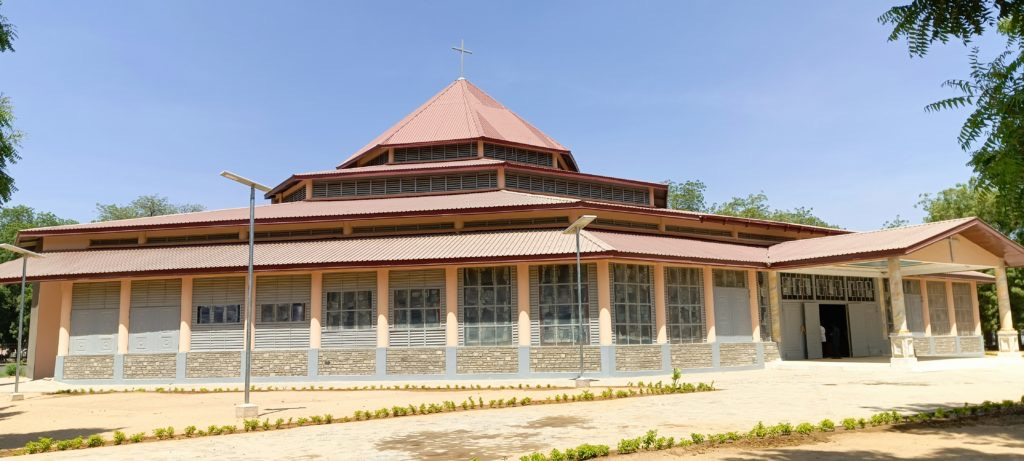
Catholic Church in Maroua

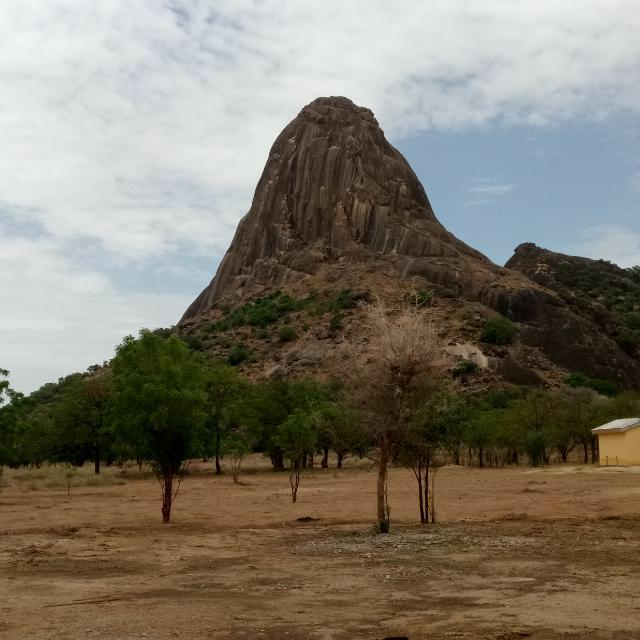
Peak of Mindif in Maroua
