= Day Spring (Utah) =

Coordinates: 37°31′50″N 113°03′03″W

Day Spring is a spring on the southeast slope of Cedar Mountain in southeastern Iron County, Utah, United States.

Day Spring was named for Thomas Day, a local shepherd.
