= Benguela Current =

Ocean current in the South Atlantic

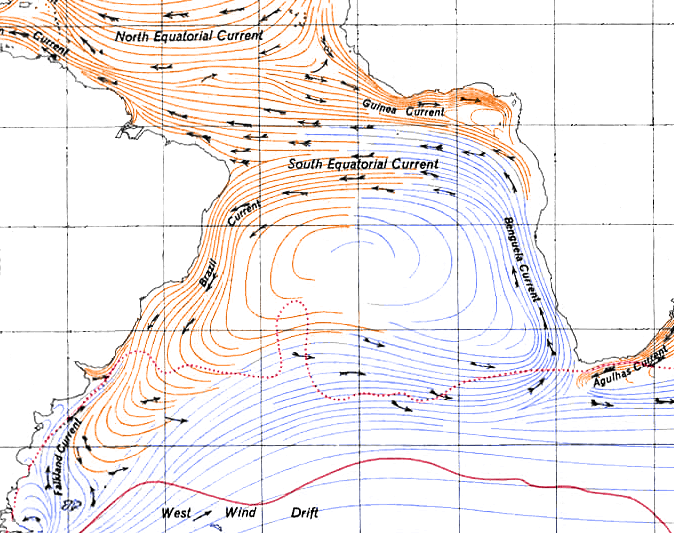
Benguela Current in the South Atlantic Gyre

The Benguela Current /bɛŋˈɡɛlə/ is the broad, northward flowing ocean current that forms the eastern portion of the South Atlantic Ocean gyre. The current extends from roughly Cape Point in the south, to the position of the Angola-Benguela Front in the north, at around 16°S. The current is driven by the prevailing south easterly trade winds. Inshore of the Benguela Current proper, the south easterly winds drive coastal upwelling, forming the Benguela Upwelling System. The cold, nutrient rich waters that upwell from around 200–300 m (656–984 ft) depth in turn fuel high rates of phytoplankton growth, and sustain the productive Benguela ecosystem.

== Boundaries ==
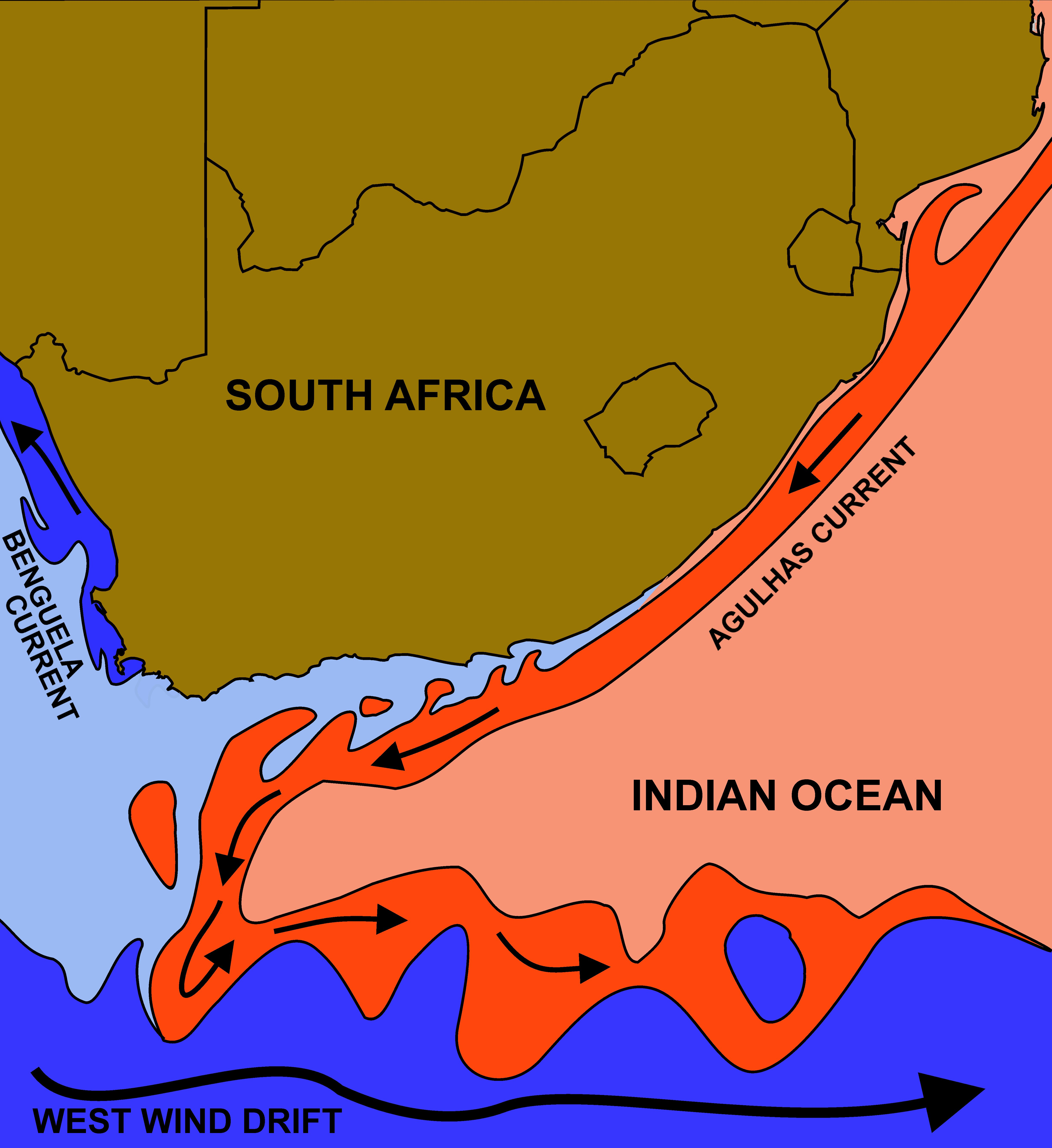
The courses of the warm Agulhas current (red) along the east coast of South Africa, and the cold Benguela current (blue) along the west coast, originating in the Indian Ocean and Atlantic Ocean respectively. Note that the Benguela current does not originate from Antarctic waters in the South Atlantic Ocean, but from upwelling of water from the cold depths of the Atlantic Ocean against the west coast of the continent. The two currents do not "meet" anywhere along the south coast of Africa.

Source waters for the Benguela include cold upwelled waters from the depths of the Atlantic Ocean close inshore, joined further off-shore by nutrient poor water that has crossed the Southern Atlantic from South America as part of South Atlantic Gyre. Eddies from the warm South Indian Ocean Agulhas current along South Africa's east coast come round the Cape of Good Hope from time to time to join the Benguela current. The Benguela current is 200 to 300 km wide and widens further as it flows north and northwest. Its western, seaward edge is well-defined, with many temporary and seasonal eddies and meanders. There is however a well-defined thermal front between the waters associated with the Benguela Upwelling System and those of the eastward flowing Atlantic currents which are not deflected northward by the African continent. The icy Benguela and the warm, south-flowing Agulhas current do not meet off the Cape of Good Hope (see diagram on the right, above), but there is a body of water off the South African south coast, east and particularly west of Cape Agulhas that consists of eddies from both currents, so that offshore water temperatures along the south coast of Africa vary chaotically.

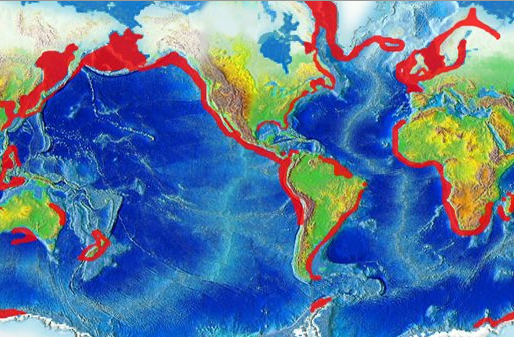
The red areas show major upwelling areas. The Benguela Current is on the southwest coast of Africa.

== Upwelling and primary production ==
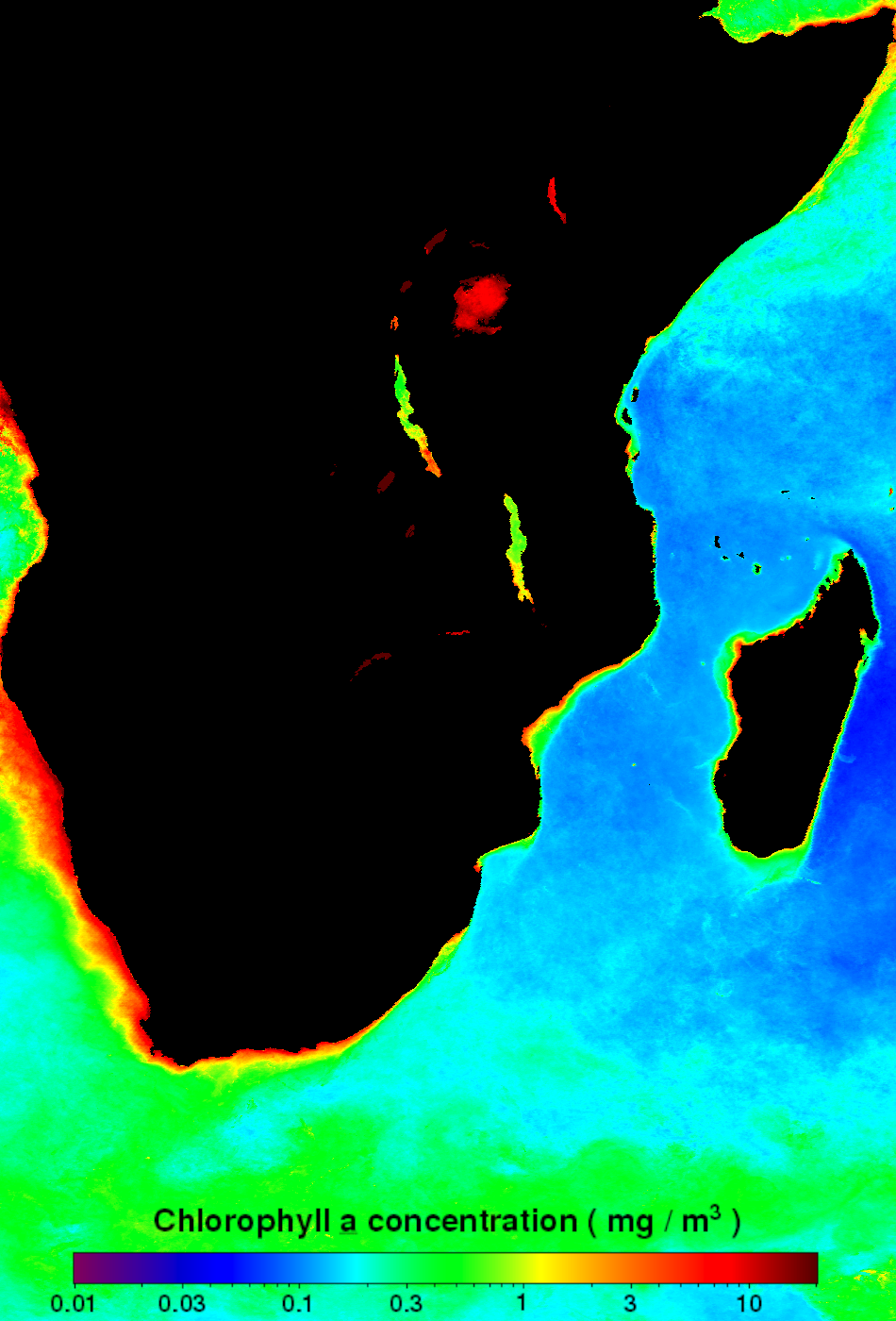
Map of the mean concentration of chlorophyll-a in the oceans surrounding Southern Africa. Note the very high concentrations along the west coast, due to the upwelling of nutrient-rich water from the cold depths of the South Atlantic Ocean, forming the Benguela Current.

Northward winds along the coast result in Ekman transport offshore and upwelling of nutrient-rich deep water to the euphotic zone. The intensity of the upwelling event is determined by wind strength. Variations in wind strength result in pulses of upwelling, which propagate to the south along the coast with speeds of 5 to 8 m/s. The pulses are similar to a Kelvin wave, except on a scale of 30 to 60 km instead of 1000 km, and can propagate around the Cape depending on wind systems.

Pulses of upwelling induce biological production. In the Benguela system, phytoplankton growth requires a period of upwelling followed by a period of stratification and relatively calm waters. The phytoplankton bloom usually lags the upwelling event by 1 to 4 days and blooms for 4 to 10 days. In order for zooplankton to have a continuous food supply, the phytoplankton blooms must not occur too far apart. Pulses of upwelling in the Benguela system regularly have a duration of 10 days, an optimal period for biological production. It is estimated that the annual biomass production in the Benguela system is 4.7×10^{13} gC/y, making the Benguela system 30 to 65 times more productive per unit area than the global ocean average.

While upwelling promotes abundant primary and secondary production in the upper parts of the water column and near the coast, deeper waters with limited oxygen exchange create hypoxic areas called oxygen minimum zones at the coastal shelf and upper coastal slope. The Benguela oxygen minimum zone starts around a depth of 100 m and is a few hundred meters thick. Bacteria that use sulphur rather than oxygen, called sulphur-reducing bacteria, reside in the oxygen minimum zone.

The most abundant fish in the Benguela system are Sardinops and Engraulis. The Southern African pilchard (S. s. ocellatus), was intensely fished in the 1950s and peaked in 1968 with landings over 1.3 million tons. Since then, fishery of the Sardinops has declined and fishery of the Southern African anchovy (Engraulis capensis) has taken over.

== Benguela Niño ==
Similar to the Pacific El Niño, a thick slab of warm, nutrient-poor water enters the northern part of the Benguela upwelling system off the Namibia coast about once per decade. During the Benguela Niño, warm, salty waters from the Angola Current move southward, between 15°S and 25°S. This slab of warm salty water extends to 150 km (93 mi) offshore and to 50 m (164 ft) depth. Heavy rains, changes in fish abundance, and temporal proximity to the Pacific El Niño have been observed; however, the causes and effects of the Benguela Niño are not well understood. One research team has shown that the Benguela Niño is caused by winds in the west-central equatorial Atlantic Ocean that propagate as subsurface sea temperature anomalies to the African coast. A recent study has demonstrated the importance of local winds in the development of the Benguela Niño off the coast of Namibia and Angola. This local process together with the remote signal from the equatorial regions form the basis of the formation mechanism in which both processes sometimes reinforce each other.

== See also ==
- Cape Peninsula
- Cape Point
- Humboldt Current, the Benguela's analogue in the South Pacific Ocean
