= Dayspring, Nigeria =

Dayspring
- Village
- Location in Nigeria
- Coordinates: 04°42′18″N 008°28′37″E
- Country: Nigeria
- State: Cross River State
- LGA: Bakassi Local Government Area
- Established: 2014
- Time zone: UTC+1 (WAT)

Dayspring is a community in Cross River State, Nigeria, West Africa. It is located on the Dayspring Peninsula (sometimes called Dayspring Island) between where the Little Kwa River and the Akpa Yafe River enter the Cross River from the east, near the mouth of the Cross River. Dayspring Island was the only portion of the Bakassi Peninsula that was not ceded to Cameroons by Nigeria.

Dayspring was established in 2014 by the Nigerian government to house the people displaced from the Cameroons Bakassi Peninsula when it was turned over to the Cameroons under the accords. The people were primarily fishermen, and two earlier locations, one inland and the other at Ikang turned out to be unsuitable. Despite delays, however, now more than 5,000 people reside at Dayspring, and the residents have a new town hall.
