= Guinea Current =

Atlantic warm-water current off West Africa

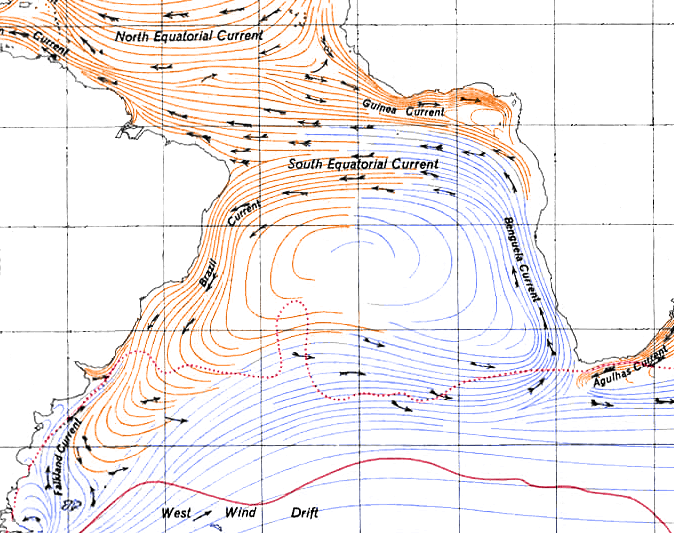
The South Atlantic Gyre.

The Guinea Current is a slow warm water current that flows to the east along the Guinea coast of West Africa. It has some similarity to the Equatorial Counter Current in the Indian, and Pacific Oceans.

== See also ==
- Ocean currents
- Oceanic gyres
- Physical oceanography
