= Cameroon Airlines =

National airline from Cameroon

IATA	ICAO	Call sign
QC	UYC	CAM-AIR
- Founded: 1979
- Ceased operations: 2008
- Hubs: Douala International Airport
- Focus cities: Yaoundé Nsimalen International Airport
- Headquarters: Douala, Cameroon
- Website: cameroon-airlines.net(archived)

Cameroon Airlines was an airline from Cameroon, serving as first flag carrier of the country. Based in Douala, it operated scheduled services within Africa, as well as to Europe and the Middle East out of its hub at Douala International Airport, with a second network focus on Yaoundé Nsimalen International Airport. The company was 96.43 percent state-owned, with the remaining shares having been held by Air France. It ceased operations in March 2008; its role as Cameroon's flag carrier was taken over by Camair-Co. The company slogan was Pour mieux vous servir, translated as To serve you better.

== History ==
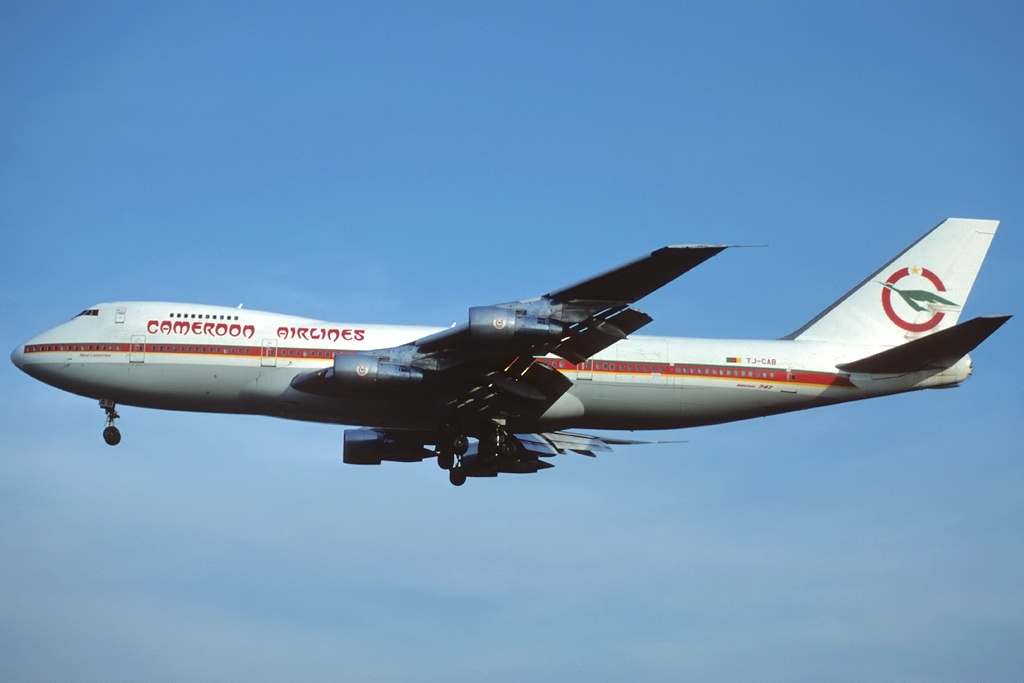
A Cameroon Airlines Boeing 747-200 approaches Orly Airport in 1989.

Cameroon Airlines was founded in 1971 (it was operating as early as 1973) in an effort to create a national Cameroonian airline, as until then domestic and international flight operations at the airports in the country were mostly executed by multi-national Air Afrique. Scheduled flights between Douala and Yaoundé were launched on 1 November of that year with an initial fleet of two Boeing 737-200 aircraft. Shortly thereafter, international flights to Rome and Paris commenced using an ex-Air France Boeing 707, which was replaced by a larger and more modern Boeing 747-200 in 1981. (This aircraft remained in service with Cameroon Airlines until 2000 when it was severely damaged in Flight 070, see below.)

Over the years, Cameroon Airlines was plagued by financial difficulties, which came along with a poor safety and maintenance record. On 16 September 2005, the airline was indefinitely banned by the French Civil Aviation Authority from operating its Paris route.

In an effort to save the airline from bankruptcy, the Government of Cameroon signed an agreement with SN Airholding, the parent company of Brussels Airlines to ensure the future funding. The plans did not materialize, though. Instead, on 11 September 2006, the launch of Camair-Co as new national airline was announced. Cameroon Airlines stayed operational until March 2008, though flight operations had only taken place at irregular intervals over those final years.

== Route network ==
=== During the 1970s ===
At that time, the Cameroon Airlines fleet consisted of two Boeing 737-200 and two Douglas DC-4 aircraft for short haul flights, as well as one Boeing 707-300 for long haul flights to Europe. Scheduled destinations included:

Benin

- Cotonou – Cadjehoun Airport

Cameroon

- Bafoussam – Bafoussam Airport
- Bali – Ngurah Rai International Airport
- Bangui – Bangui M'Poko International Airport
- Batouri – Batouri Airport
- Bertoua – Bertoua Airport
- Douala – Douala International Airport (hub)
- Dschang – Dschang Airport
- Garoua – Garoua International Airport
- Koutaba – Koutaba Airport
- Mamfe – Mamfe Airport
- Maroua – Maroua Airport
- Ngaoundéré – Ngaoundéré Airport
- Tiko – Tiko Airport
- Yagoua – Yagoua Airport
- Yaoundé – Yaoundé Nsimalen International Airport (focus city)

Chad

- N'Djamena – N'Djamena International Airport

Congo

- Brazzaville – Maya-Maya Airport

Equatorial Guinea

- Malabo – Malabo International Airport

France

- Marseille – Marseille-Marignane Airport
- Paris – Paris-Orly Airport

Gabon

- Libreville – Libreville International Airport

Italy

- Rome – Leonardo da Vinci-Fiumicino Airport

Ivory Coast

- Abidjan – Port Bouet Airport

Nigeria

- Lagos – Lagos-Ikeja Airport

Senegal

- Dakar – Dakar Yoff International Airport

Switzerland

- Geneva – Geneva-Cointrin Airport

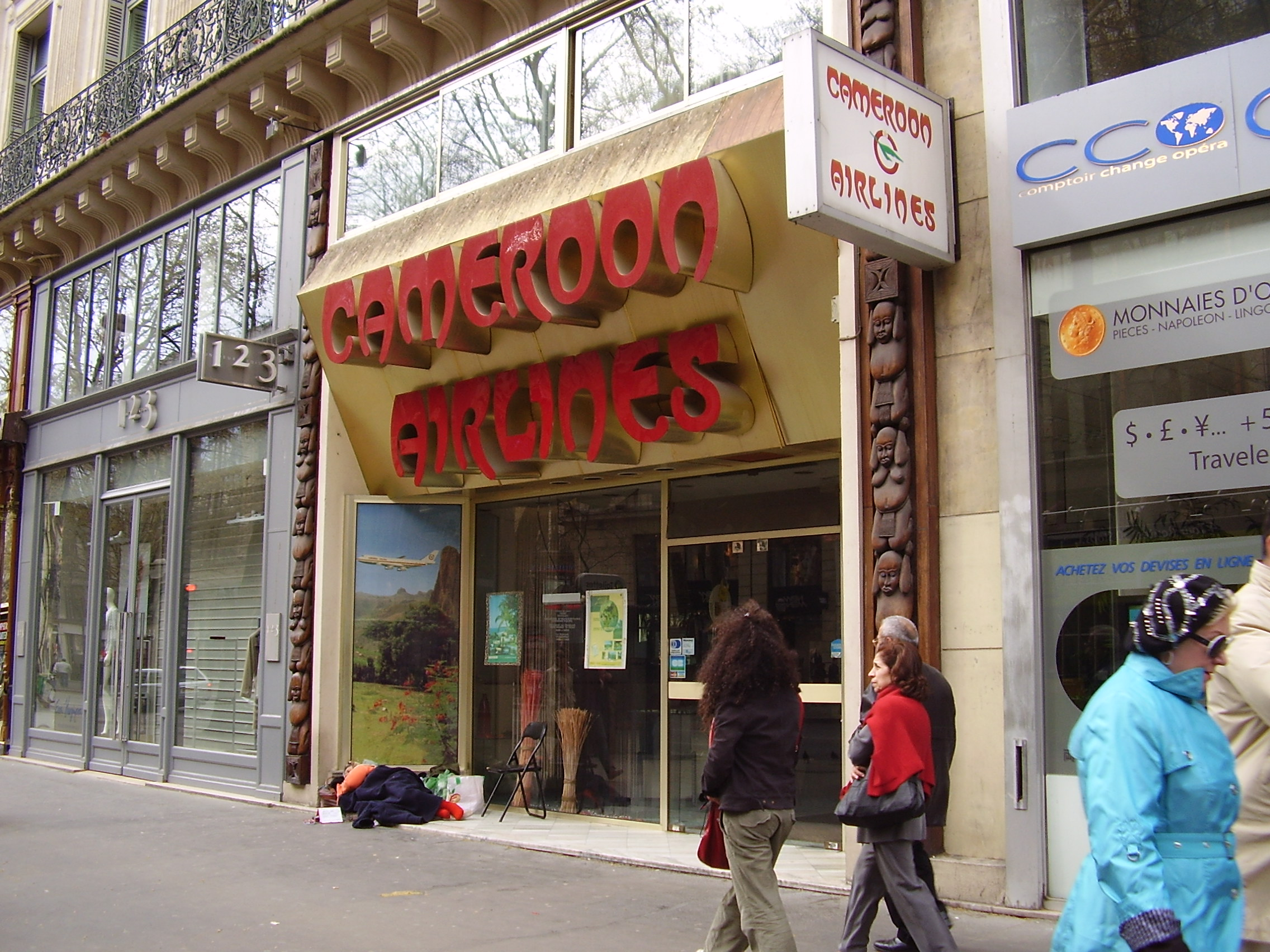
The entrance to the former Cameroon Airlines office in Paris as it appeared in 2010.

=== During the 1990s ===
Cameroon Airlines had scaled down the domestic route network in a cost-saving measure, relying on the larger sub-Saharan cities as well as some European destinations:

Belgium

- Brussels – Brussels Airport

Benin

- Cotonou – Cadjehoun Airport

Cameroon

- Douala – Douala International Airport (hub)
- Garoua – Garoua International Airport
- Yaoundé – Yaoundé Nsimalen International Airport

Chad

- N'Djamena – N'Djamena International Airport

Congo

- Brazzaville – Maya-Maya Airport

Equatorial Guinea

- Malabo – Malabo International Airport

France

- Paris – Charles de Gaulle Airport

Gabon

- Libreville – Libreville International Airport

Kenya

- Nairobi – Nairobi International Airport

Nigeria

- Lagos – Murtala Muhammed International Airport

Saudi Arabia

- Jeddah – King Abdulaziz International Airport

South Africa

- Johannesburg – Johannesburg International Airport

United Kingdom

- London – Gatwick Airport

Zaire

- Kinshasa – N'djili Airport

Zimbabwe

- Harare – Harare International Airport

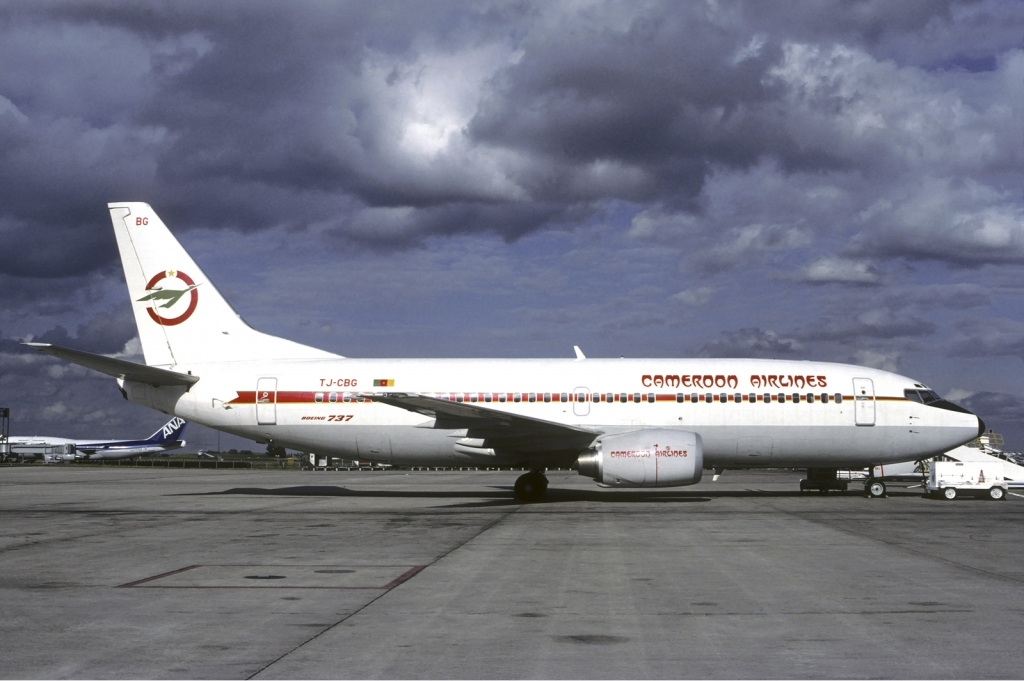
A Cameroon Airlines Boeing 737-300 at Charles de Gaulle Airport in 1998.

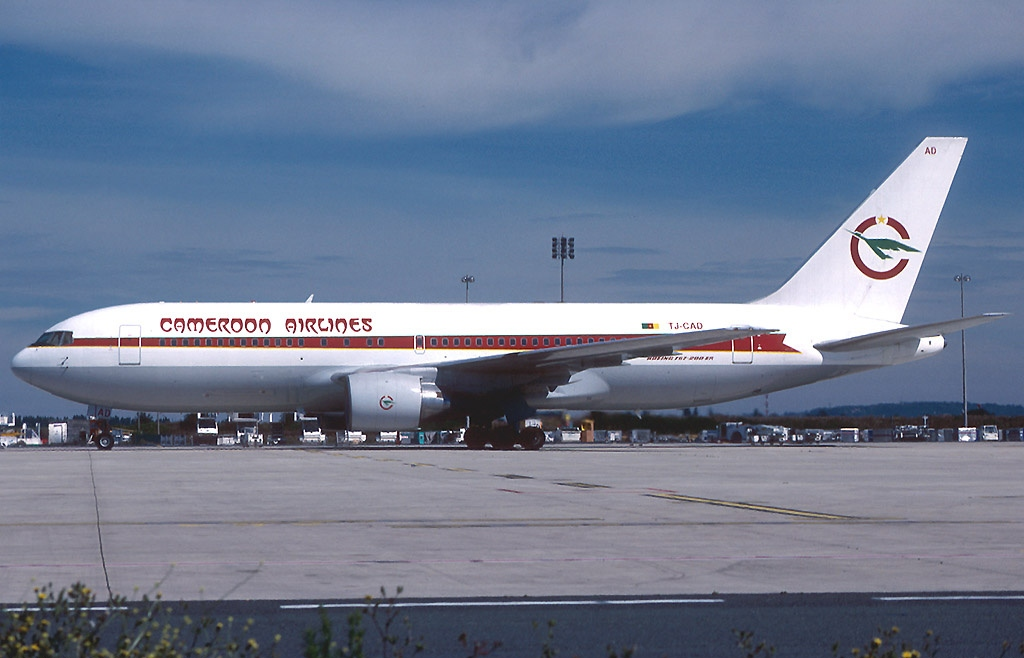
A Boeing 767-200 of Cameroon Airlines at Charles de Gaulle Airport in 2001.

== Fleet ==
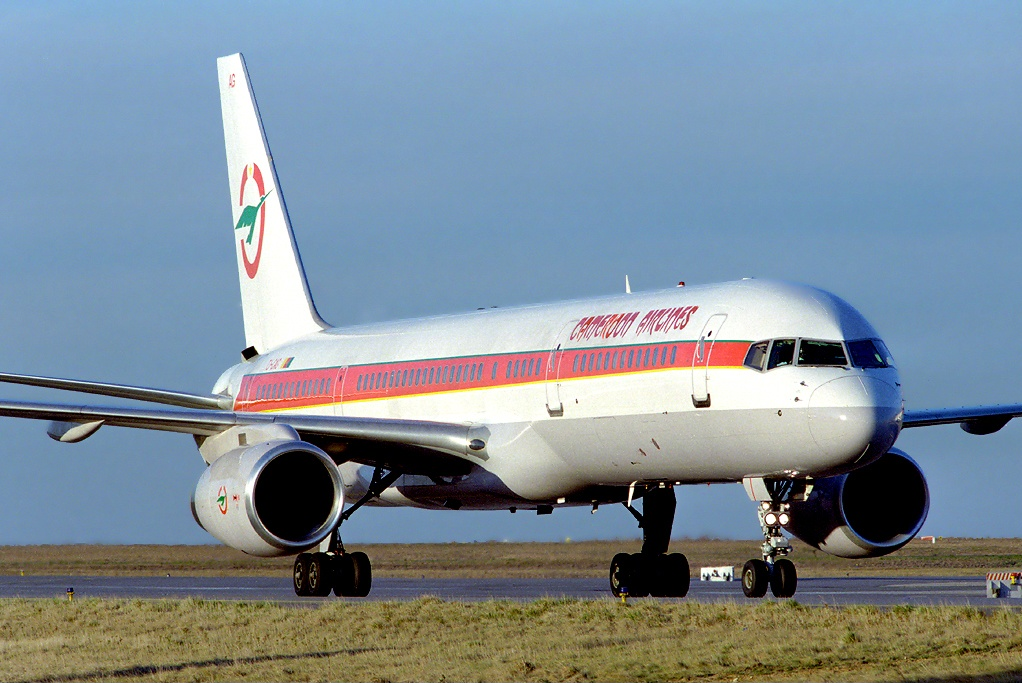
A Boeing 757-200 in 2002, again at Charles de Gaulle Airport, the most important international destination of Cameroon Airlines.

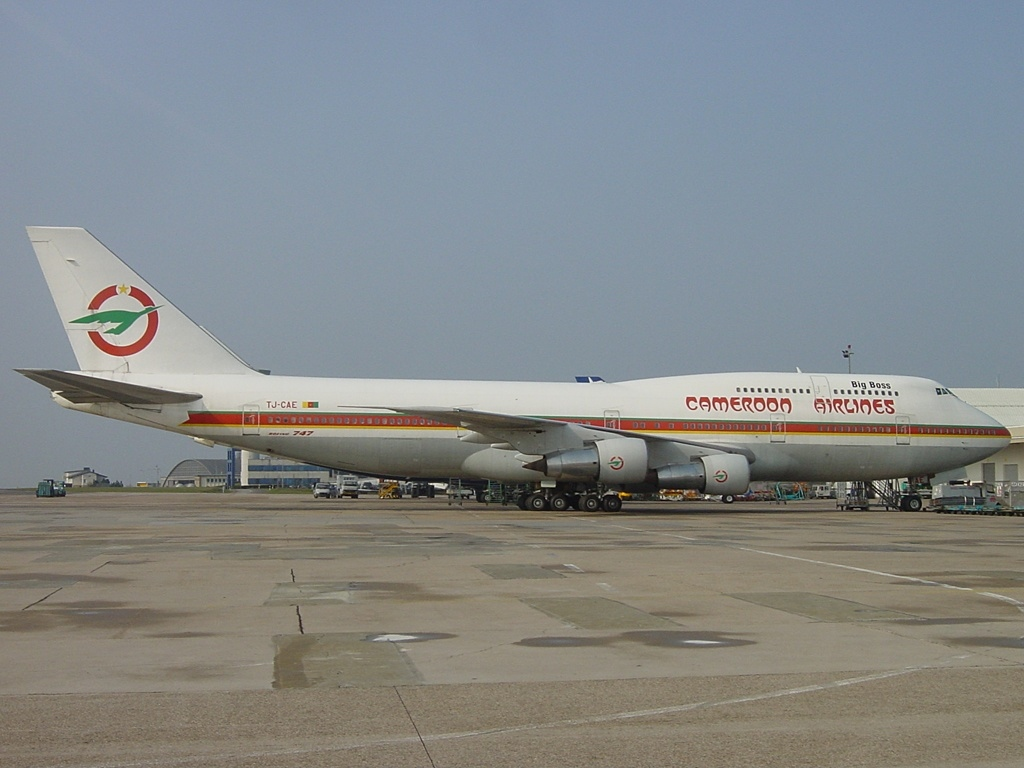
A Boeing 747-300, the largest aircraft to have ever operated by the airline, at Luxembourg Findel Airport in 2003.

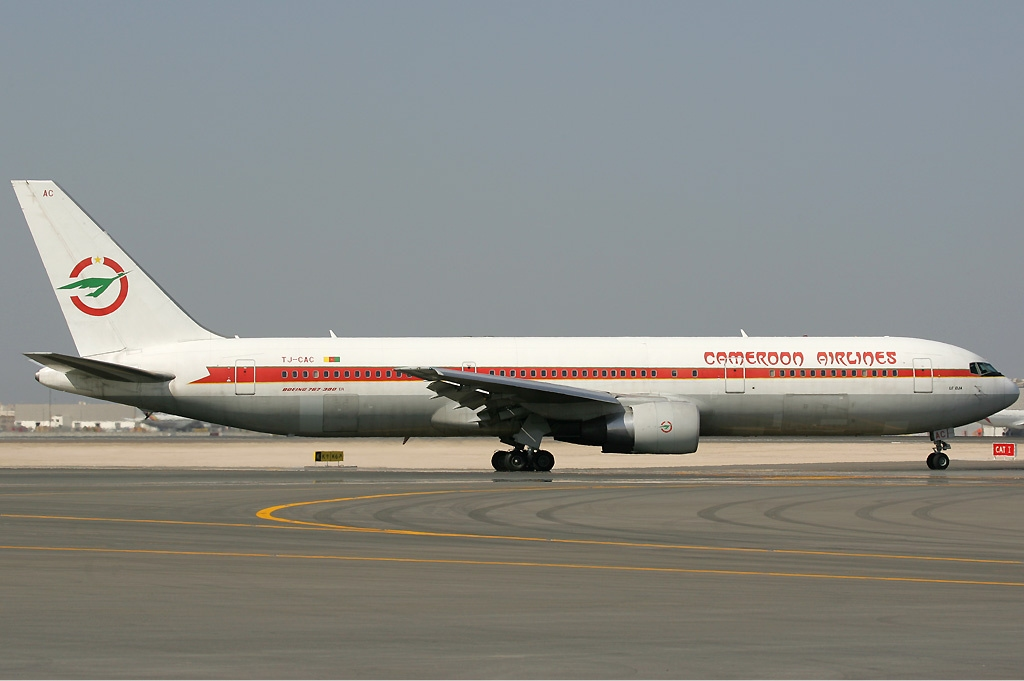
A Boeing 767-300 of Cameroon Airlines at Dubai International Airport in 2005.

Over the years, Cameroon Airlines operated the following aircraft types:

Aircraft	Introduced	Retired
Boeing 707-300	1971	1987
Boeing 737-200	1971	2006
Boeing 737-300	1996	2005
Boeing 747-200	1981	2000
Boeing 747-300	2001	2004
Boeing 757-200	2002	2008
Boeing 767-200	2001	2008
Boeing 767-300	2000	2008
Bombardier CRJ200	2001	2002
Douglas DC-4	1961	1968
Hawker Siddeley HS 748	1978	1989
Twin Otter	1974	1981
Embraer 145	2002	2002

== Accidents and incidents ==
- On 31 October 1981, a Cameroon Airlines Twin Otter (registered TJ-CBC) did not gain sufficient altitude upon take-off at Bafoussam Airport because of a severe overload, causing the aircraft to crash, by which one passenger was killed. (There had been 22 passengers and two pilots on board).
- On 30 August 1984, Cameroon Airlines Flight 786, a Boeing 737-200 registered TJ-CBD, experienced an engine explosion when taxiing at Douala International Airport prior to departure for Yaoundé. A fire from the damaged fuel tank engulfed the aircraft. Two passengers were trapped by the flames and died. The remaining 107 passengers and seven crew members were able to evacuate the plane.
- On 28 June 1989 at 21:19 local time, a Cameroon Airlines Hawker Siddeley HS 748 (registered TJ-CCF) overshot the runway upon landing in stormy weather at Yaoundé International Airport following a scheduled flight from Douala and collided with an embankment, killing the two pilots and one of the 45 passengers on board.
- On 3 December 1995 at 22:44 local time, Cameroon Airlines Flight 3701, which was operated by a Boeing 737-200 (registered TJ-CBE), crashed near Douala, killing 71 out of the 76 people on board in what marked the worst accident in the history of the airline. The aircraft had attempted to land at Douala International Airport following a flight from Cotonou, when it experienced a problem with the landing gear. During a go-around following a second landing attempt, the pilots chose a wrong thrust application for the engines, which led to the aircraft running out of control.
- On 5 November 2000 at 20:57 local time, Cameroon Airlines Flight 070 from Douala to Paris, which was operated by a Boeing 747-200 (registered TJ-CAB), veered off the runway upon landing at Paris-Charles de Gaulle Airport, causing the front landing gear to be torn off and the aircraft being damaged beyond repair. All 187 passengers and 16 crew members were evacuated. The cause for the accident was determined to be a differential thrust that had been caused by the failure of three of the four thrust reversers to deploy properly. Running against air accident regulations, the pilots had not stopped the cockpit voice recorder, so that the 30-minutes loop tape was overridden and vital information was lost for the investigators.
- On 4 February 2004 at approximately 20:00 local time, a Cameroon Airlines 737-200 (registered TJ-AIO) suffered a blown tire upon take-off at Cotonou Airport, which resulted in a small fire that was extinguished following an emergency landing.
