= List of airports in Cameroon =

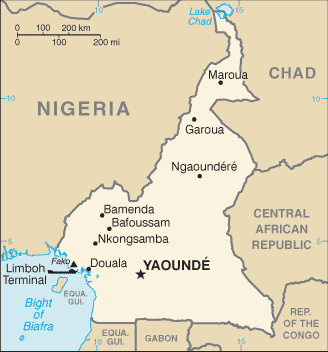
Map of Cameroon

This is a list of airports in Cameroon, sorted by location.

Cameroon, officially the Republic of Cameroon (French: République du Cameroun), is a country in west Central Africa. It is bordered by Nigeria to the west; Chad to the northeast; the Central African Republic to the east; and Equatorial Guinea, Gabon, and the Republic of the Congo to the south. Cameroon's coastline lies on the Bight of Biafra (also known as Bight of Bonny), which is part of the Gulf of Guinea and the Atlantic Ocean. Cameroon is divided into ten regions (provinces until 2008). The capital city is Yaoundé.

== Airports ==
Airport names shown in bold indicate the airport has scheduled service on commercial airlines.

City served	Region	ICAO	IATA	Airport name	Coordinates
Bafoussam	West	FKKU	BFX	**Bafoussam Airport**	05°32′12″N 010°21′16″E
Bafut	Northwest	FKKG	BLC	Bafut Airport	05°53′43.3″N 010°2′2.0″E
Bamenda	Northwest	FKKV	BPC	Bamenda Airport	06°02′21″N 010°07′21″E
Banyo	Adamaoua	FKAB		Banyo Airport	06°46′29.5″N 011°48′27.3″E
Batouri	East	FKKI	OUR	Batouri Airport	04°28′30″N 014°21′45″E
Bertoua	East	FKKO	BTA	Bertoua Airport	04°32′55″N 013°43′34″E
Douala	Littoral	FKKD	DLA	**Douala International Airport**	04°00′21″N 009°43′10″E
Dschang	West	FKKS	DSC	Dschang Airport	05°26′50.9″N 010°4′4.6″E
Ebolowa	South	FKKW	EBW	Ebolowa Airport	02°52′38.6″N 011°11′3.0″E
Eséka	Centre	FKKE		Eséka Airport	03°38′29.5″N 010°47′27.9″E
Foumban / Koutaba	West	FKKM	FOM / KOB	Foumban Nkounja Airport (Koutaba Airport)	05°38′13″N 010°45′03″E
Garoua	North	FKKR	GOU	**Garoua International Airport**	09°20′09″N 013°22′12″E
Kaélé	Far North	FKKH	KLE	Kaélé Airport	10°05′33″N 014°26′44″E
Kribi	South	FKKB	KBI	Kribi Airport	02°52′26″N 009°58′40″E
Limbe	Southwest		VCC	Limbe Airport	04°0′59″N 009°12′1″E
Mamfe	Southwest	FKKF	MMF	Mamfe Airport	05°42′16.2″N 009°18′20.8″E
Maroua / Salak	Far North	FKKL	MVR	**Maroua Salak Airport**	10°27′05″N 014°15′26″E
Ngaoundéré	Adamawa	FKKN	NGE	**Ngaoundéré Airport** (N'Gaoundéré Airport)	07°21′25″N 013°33′33″E
Nkongsamba	Littoral		NKS	Nkongsamba Airport	04°57′0″N 009°56′0″E
Tiko	Southwest	FKKC	TKC	Tiko Airport	04°05′21″N 009°21′37″E
Yagoua	Far North	FKKJ	GXX	Yagoua Airport	10°21′22″N 015°14′14″E
Yaoundé / Nsimalen	Centre	FKYS	NSI	**Yaoundé Nsimalen International Airport**	03°43′21″N 011°33′12″E
Yaoundé	Centre	FKKY	YAO	Yaoundé Airport (Yaoundé Ville Airport)	03°50′10″N 011°31′24″E

== See also ==
- Transport in Cameroon
- Cameroon Air Force
- List of airports by ICAO code: F#FK - Cameroon
- Wikipedia: WikiProject Aviation/Airline destination lists: Africa#Cameroon
