= Kenya Airways Flight 507 =

2007 aviation accident in Cameroon

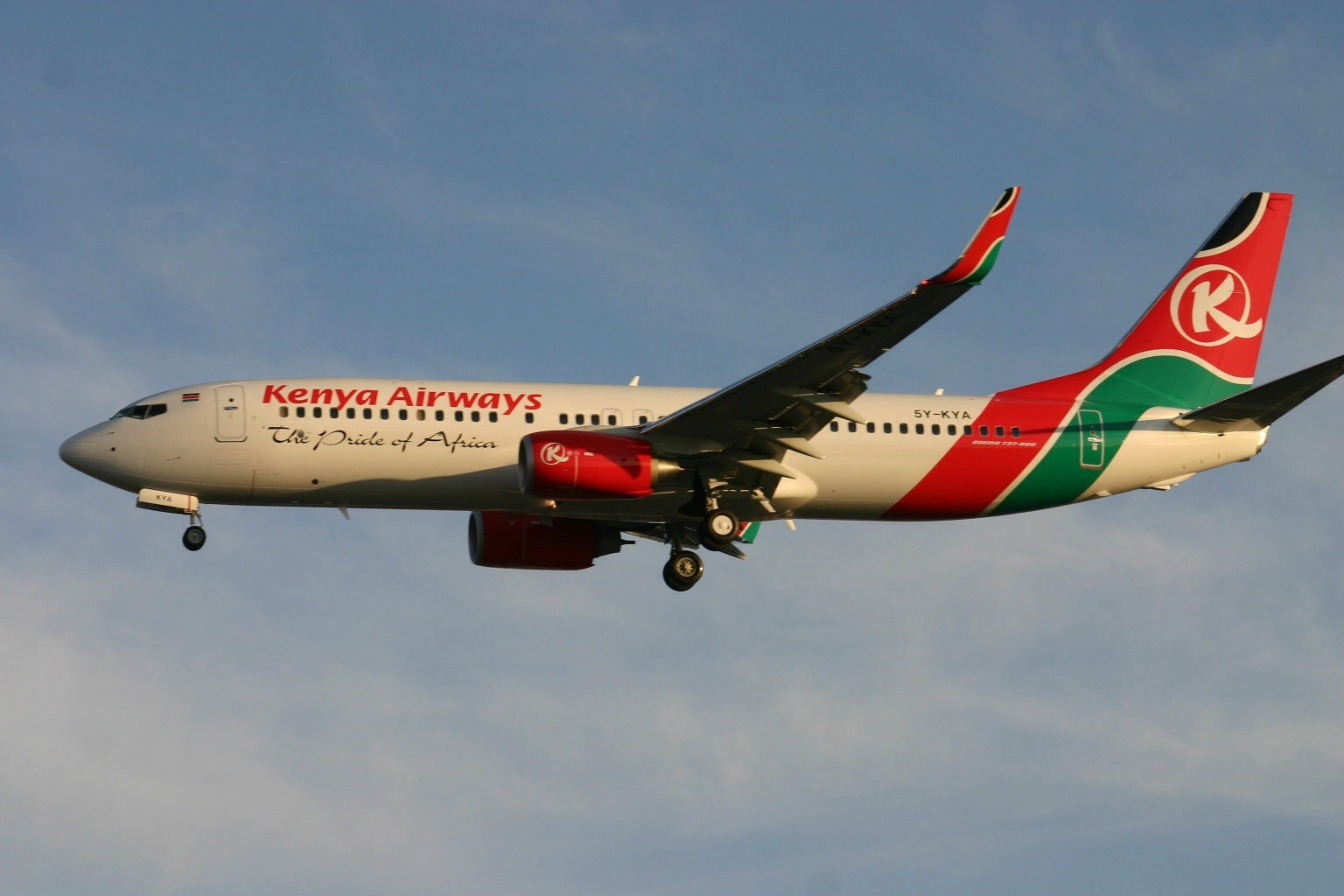
- 5Y-KYA, the aircraft involved in the accident, photographed in 2006

Accident
- Date: 5 May 2007
- Summary: Pilot error leading to loss of control in flight
- Site: Mbanga Pongo, near Douala International Airport, Douala, Cameroon; 3.9557°N 9.7509°E

Aircraft
- Aircraft type: Boeing 737-8AL
- Operator: Kenya Airways
- IATA flight No.: KQ507
- ICAO flight No.: KQA507
- Call sign: KENYA 507
- Registration: 5Y-KYA
- Flight origin: Port Bouet Airport, Abidjan, Ivory Coast
- Stopover: Douala International Airport, Douala, Cameroon
- Destination: Jomo Kenyatta International Airport, Nairobi, Kenya
- Occupants: 114
- Passengers: 108
- Crew: 6
- Fatalities: 114
- Survivors: 0

Kenya Airways Flight 507 was a scheduled international passenger service between Abidjan, Ivory Coast, and Nairobi, Kenya, with a stopover in Douala, Cameroon, operated by Kenya Airways. On 5 May 2007, the Boeing 737-800 aircraft serving the flight crashed immediately after takeoff from Douala International Airport in Cameroon, killing all 114 occupants onboard.

The plane broke up into small pieces and came to rest mostly submerged in a mangrove swamp, 5.4 kilometres (3.4 mi; 2.9 nmi) to the south (176°) of the end of Douala International Airport's runway 12. There were no survivors. The investigation by the Cameroon Civil Aviation Authority determined that the pilots failed to notice and correct excessive bank following takeoff. This led to the loss of control and crash of the aircraft.

== Accident ==
Flight 507 was one of three scheduled to depart from Douala Airport around midnight that day, with two other flights operated by Cameroon Airlines and Royal Air Maroc. The aircrew of the Cameroonian and the Moroccan companies elected to wait for the weather to improve, while the Kenya Airways crew decided to depart, as they had already been delayed over an hour and the pilot felt that the weather had improved enough for departure. The pilot in command nonetheless failed to seek takeoff clearance from the Airport Control Tower and the aircraft departed Douala at 00:06 local time on 5 May (23:06 UTC on 4 May); the flight was due to arrive in Nairobi at 06:15 local time (03:15 UTC).

Once airborne, the plane had a tendency to bank right, which the captain countered by using his control wheel. Twenty-four seconds after take-off, at an altitude of 1,000 ft (300 m), the captain let go of the control wheel, and eighteen seconds later called out "Ok, command", indicating to the first officer to engage the autopilot. This command was not read back by the first officer indicating that he had not acknowledged the command and neither was there audio confirmation in the cockpit indicating that the autopilot had been engaged. In the 55 seconds that followed, the aircraft was being piloted by neither pilot nor the autopilot. This led to it gradually increasing its banking angle from less than 1°, at the time the captain let go of the control wheel, to 34° when the bank angle warning came on. The captain may have panicked at the sound of the banking angle warning, as he made a series of movements on the control wheel which only aggravated the situation. He moved the control wheel first left, then 40° right, then 11° to the left. With the plane banking at 50°, a belated attempt was made to engage the autopilot. The captain then tried to bring the plane under control by using the right rudder, causing it to bank further to the right. The first officer gave the control wheel near opposite commands to what the captain had done. The captain, on noticing this, engaged the autopilot, but by then the plane was banked at nearly 115° to the right at 2,290 ft (700 m) altitude and was in an unrecoverable situation. It crashed into a mangrove swamp less than two minutes after takeoff.

There were no communications between the aircraft and the ground after take-off. Kenya Airways set up a crisis management center at Jomo Kenyatta International Airport in Nairobi.

The wreckage was discovered on 6 May in a swamp, some 20 kilometres (12 mi; 11 nmi) southeast of Douala, submerged under mud and water. There were no survivors. Furthermore, Kenya Airways Group managing director Titus Naikuni said in Nairobi that local people had led rescuers to the crash site. Cameroon's Minister of State for Territorial Administration Hamidou Yaya Marafa told a news conference that day, "All I can say for now is that the wreckage of the plane has been located in the small village of Mbanga Pongo, in the Douala III subdivision. We are putting in place rescue measures." Kenya Airways reported that 29 bodies had been recovered from the crash site, while reports from Cameroon claimed that over 40 had been recovered. Workers reported that the bodies were "badly disfigured" and that identification would be difficult. Heavy rains in the area continued to hamper all efforts.

== Aircraft ==
The aircraft involved, registration 5Y-KYA, serial number 35069, was a Boeing 737-8AL that was equipped with twin CFMI CFM56-7B26 powerplants. The airframe first flew on 9 October 2006, and was delivered to Kenya Airways on 27 October. The aircraft was six months old at the time of the accident. It was one of three Boeing 737–800s Kenya Airways had recently acquired from Singapore Aircraft Leasing Enterprise.

== Passengers and crew ==
Kenya Airways disclosed a passenger list indicating that the 105 passengers on board were citizens of 26 countries. Thirty-seven people were from Cameroon, and nine of the occupants were Kenyan. Seventeen passengers boarded in Abidjan, while the rest did so in Douala.

The six flight crew members were all Kenyan. An accompanying engineer and a deadheading flight attendant were among the passengers.

Captain Francis Mbatia Wamwea (aged 52)—who had logged 8,500 hours on jetliners—and first officer Andrew Wanyoike Kiuru (aged 23) had joined the airline 20 years and one year, respectively, before the accident.

Among the passengers on board was Anthony Mitchell, an Associated Press reporter based in Kenya.

Nationality	Passengers	Crew	Total
Burkina Faso	1	0	1
Cameroon	37	0	37
Central African Republic	2	0	2
China	5	0	5
Comoros	2	0	2
Democratic Republic of the Congo	2	0	2
Republic of the Congo	1	0	1
Ivory Coast	6	0	6
Egypt	1	0	1
Equatorial Guinea	2	0	2
Ghana	1	0	1
India	15	0	15
Kenya	3	6	9
South Korea	1	0	1
Mali	1	0	1
Mauritius	1	0	1
Niger	3	0	3
Nigeria	6	0	6
Senegal	1	0	1
South Africa	7	0	7
Sweden	1	0	1
Switzerland	1	0	1
Tanzania	1	0	1
Togo	1	0	1
United Kingdom	5	0	5
United States	1	0	1
Total	108	6	114

== Investigation ==
The Cameroonian government established a technical commission of inquiry to investigate the accident. The National Transportation Safety Board of the United States sent a "Go-team" to assist with the investigation.

Early attention as to the cause of the crash centred on the possibility of dual engine flameout during heavy weather. Several clues pointed in this direction, including the time the plane was in the air, the distress call issued by the aircraft (both later disputed), the meteorological conditions at the time of the crash, and the nose-down position of the wreckage. The investigators theorised that this would be consistent with the plane losing power in both engines, attempting to glide back to the airport, and stalling during the attempt.

The flight data recorder (FDR) was recovered on 7 May, and the cockpit voice recorder (CVR) on 15 June. Both were sent to the Transportation Safety Board in Canada where they were read out.

The Cameroon Civil Aviation Authority (CCAA) released its final report on the crash on 28 April 2010. The investigation found that the aircraft departed without receiving clearance from air traffic control. The captain, who was the flying pilot, corrected a right bank several times after takeoff. After 42 seconds of flight, the captain indicated that he had activated the autopilot. The autopilot did not engage, nor was the message acknowledged by the copilot. The pilots did not notice that the aircraft was increasingly banking to the right, from 11° when the captain indicated that he had set the autopilot, to 34° when a bank angle warning sounded 40 seconds later. The captain then activated the autopilot, but his inputs on the controls led to a further increase in the bank angle. The aircraft pitched nose down after it reached a height of 2,900 feet (880 m) with a 115° right bank. The two pilots used opposite and conflicting control inputs to attempt to recover the aircraft. The aircraft crashed at 287 knots (532 km/h; 330 mph), at 48° down pitch and 60° right bank.

During captain Wamwea's upgrade training, his instructors recorded the following deficiencies: crew resource management skills, adherence to standard operating procedures, cockpit scan, and situational awareness. A 2002 training reported noted that the captain had a tendency to be overbearing towards his coworkers. The captain had also failed a line check on a scheduled passenger flight when he decided to divert after the standby Attitude Direction Indicator (ADI) failed. He underwent a re-check and passed. Even after becoming captain, these deficiencies were still noted, and instructors filed reports on them. The airline dealt with all of the reports and made remedial recommendations. Other Kenya Airways pilots described Captain Wamea as overconfident and arrogant, but friendly. The CCAA stated that his behavior was likely influenced by his training setbacks. During flight 507, he behaved towards first officer Kiuru in a "paternal" manner.

First officer Kiuru had also failed an instrument flight rules (IFR) and a radiotelephony (R/T) test and had to retake both of them. Although his overall performance was satisfactory, instructors noticed that Kiuru had issues monitoring errors of the pilot flying and calling them out, as well as monitoring the autopilot after engaging it. Coworkers described Kiuru as reserved and not assertive. During flight 507, he was intimidated by captain Wamwea treating him disrespectfully (although he had given Kiuru some words of encouragement), and did not challenge him for his mistakes, instead relying on the captain's confidence.

The CCAA determined the probable causes of the crash to be "loss of control of the aircraft as a result of spatial disorientation (non recognized or subtle type transitioning to recognized spatial disorientation) after a long slow roll, during which no instrument scanning was done, and in the absence of external visual references in a dark night. Inadequate operational control, lack of crew coordination, coupled with the non-adherence to procedures of flight monitoring, confusion in the utilization of the autopilot, have also contributed to cause this situation."

== In popular culture ==
The accident is featured in the ninth episode of Season 20 of Mayday, also known as Air Crash Investigation. The episode is titled "Stormy Cockpit".
