= Isabelle Bassong =

Cameroonian linguist and diplomat (1937–2006)

- Born: Jeanne Isabelle Marguerite Akoumba Monneyang; 9 February 1937; Ebolowa, Cameroon
- Died: 2006/11/09
- Citizenship: Cameroon
- Education: Sorbonne; University of Colorado Denver
- Occupations: Linguist, diplomat and politician
- Political party: Cameroon People's Democratic Movement
- Children: 3

Jeanne Isabelle Marguerite Bassong (9 February 1937 – 9 November 2006) was a Cameroonian linguist, diplomat and ambassador who represented her country to the Benelux countries for 17 years.

== Background ==
She was born as Jeanne Isabelle Marguerite Akoumba Monneyang in Ebolowa in Cameroon's South Region; her father was a civil servant and her mother was a housewife.

== Education ==
She undertook secondary education in the city of Douala, before going to Cahors in France, where she obtained a baccalaureate in experimental sciences. She went on to study at the Sorbonne in Paris, obtaining a bachelor's degree and diploma of higher studies in linguistics. She subsequently went to the United States, where she studied at the University of Colorado Denver, graduating as a Master of Science in Linguistics.

== Career ==
She was appointed Director of Linguistic Services to the National Assembly of Cameroon on returning to Cameroon in 1964. In February 1984, she was appointed Secretary of State for Public Health. She entered the diplomatic service at the end of the 1980s, serving as Cameroon's ambassador to Belgium, Netherlands, Luxembourg and the European Community between 1989 and 2006. As one of the longest-serving ambassadors in Brussels, she served as President of the Committee of Ambassadors of the African, Caribbean and Pacific Group of States. She represented her country in a number of key negotiations: the Fourth Lomé Convention of 1990, the revised Convention of 1995 and the Cotonou Agreement of 2000, as well as serving as Cameroon's Counsel at the International Court of Justice in The Hague during lengthy hearings on the dispute with Nigeria over the sovereignty of the Bakassi Peninsula. She was also a member of the ruling Cameroon People's Democratic Movement, serving as the party's assistant secretary for the press, information, and propaganda.

== Death ==
She died in Brussels, leaving a husband and three children. She was given two official funerals, in Brussels and in the Cameroonian capital Yaoundé, where she is buried.
