= GXX =

GXX or gxx may refer to:

- Central Guere language (ISO 639-3: gxx), a Kru language spoken in Ivory Coast
- Yagoua Airport (IATA: GXX), a public use airport located in Yagoua, Extrême-Nord, Cameroon
