= Cameroon Civil Aviation Authority =

Civil aviation authority of Cameroon

CCAA
- Cameroon Civil Aviation Authority
- Formation: 24th of December 1998
- Legal status: Public administrative establishment with legal personality and financial autonomy
- Headquarters: Air Base 101, Yaoundé
- Location: Cameroon
- Official language: English, French
- Head of Board: Maximin Paul NKOUE NKONGO
- Director General: Mrs. Paule ASSOUMOU KOKI
- Deputy Director General: ALLABIRA MAMADOU
- Affiliations: https://mintransports.net
- Website: www.ccaa.aero

The Cameroon Civil Aviation Authority (CCAA, French: Autorité aéronautique du Cameroun) is a public administrative establishment responsible for implementing civil aviation regulations, overseeing air transport and airport development, and ensuring civil aviation safety and security.

Established in 1999, the CCAA serves as the government agency coordinating and monitoring civil aviation activities in Cameroon. Its head office is located in Yaoundé at Air Base 101.

== History ==
The use of aviation for transporting people and goods significantly increased after World War II, largely due to the implementation of the Convention on International Civil Aviation (Chicago Convention). Signed on December 7, 1944, by 52 states, the Convention established principles and arrangements to ensure the safe and orderly development of international civil aviation. It also led to the creation of the International Civil Aviation Organization (ICAO), a specialized United Nations agency responsible for coordinating and regulating international air transport.

Between 1945 and 1960, as Cameroon pursued self-determination, it developed numerous airfields, establishing internal and international air links. Following its independence on January 1, 1960, Cameroon ratified the Chicago Convention on January 15, 1960, committing to the uniformity of regulations, standards, procedures, and organization related to aviation to improve air navigation.

To fulfill its obligations under the Chicago Convention, Cameroon established a Civil Aviation Authority (DAC) within the Ministry of Transport in 1963. From 1963 to 1998, under the direction of a Director, the DAC was responsible for air transport policy, air traffic and transport regulations, air navigation supervision, airport facility inspections, and coordination of air transport activities, including participation in international conferences.

In response to ICAO's findings in the 1980s and 1990s that some states struggled with implementing international aviation standards, ICAO recommended the establishment of autonomous civil aviation authorities. Consequently, the CCAA was created under Article No. 98/023 of December 24, 1998, and reinforced by implementing decree No. 99/198 of September 16, 1999.

Over time, the missions of the CCAA and the powers of its Director General have been extended through:

- Law No. 2013/010 of 24 July 2013 on the civil aviation regime in Cameroon and its implementing decree No. 2015/232 of 25 May 2015;
- Decree No. 2018/006 of 8 January 2018 approving and making enforceable the National Civil Aviation Security Program of Cameroon;
- Decree No. 2019/174 of 9 April 2019 on the reorganization and functioning of the Aeronautical Authority.

== Missions ==
The primary missions of the Cameroon Civil Aviation Authority (CCAA) include implementing national and community civil aviation policies, participating in the drafting of civil aviation laws and regulations, and developing and updating national civil aviation safety and security programs.

The CCAA supervises civil aviation safety and security in Cameroon, oversees economic aspects of all aeronautical activities, and manages national airspace in coordination with military authorities. Additionally, the CCAA is responsible for managing aeronautical assets, planning airport development in collaboration with relevant authorities, ensuring the safe operation and development of aeronautical services and facilities, and implementing security measures at airports. The Authority also coordinates search and rescue services, negotiates civil aviation agreements, manages Cameroon’s portfolio of signed agreements, and monitors relations with regional and international organizations.

== Organization ==
The organizational structure of the Cameroon Civil Aviation Authority (CCAA) as of March 11, 2016, and updated in 2017, includes central services and decentralized services. Central services consist of those attached to the Directorate General and a central administration. At the operational level, the CCAA's activities are organized around three primary processes: security supervision, safety supervision, and the development of air transport and airport operations.

=== Central services ===
The main operational structures of the central services are:

- The Directorate of Aviation Safety is responsible for the supervision of safety. It shall ensure the implementation of national civil aviation safety requirements and coordinate the development and implementation of national civil aviation safety programme.
- The Directorate of Security and Facilitation is responsible for overseeing the security and facilitation of civil aviation. It shall ensure the implementation of the relevant national requirements and ensure the constant assessment of the threat in liaison with the administrations concerned.
- The Directorate for the Operation of Airport Commands is responsible for providing air navigation services and operating aerodromes not licensed by the State.
- The Operational Security Division is responsible for the implementation of security measures at airports in collaboration with partner administrations
- The Air Transport Division is responsible for the economic supervision of aeronautical activities, the monitoring of the liberalization of the aviation sector and the implementation of environmental protection measures.
- The Training School which provides training in civil aviation.

=== Decentralized services ===
Decentralized services of the Cameroon Civil Aviation Authority (CCAA) include the management of international airports in Douala, Yaoundé-Nsimalen, and Garoua; category B airports in Maroua, Bafoussam, Bamenda, and Ngaoundéré; and category C airports in Koutaba, Tiko, Bertoua, Batouri, Kribi, and Mamfé. Additionally, the CCAA oversees training centers in Douala and Yaoundé, with the Douala center certified by ICAO as a Regional Training Centre in Civil Aviation Security.

== Financing ==
The resources of the Cameroon Civil Aviation Authority (CCAA) are derived from several sources, including fees for services rendered, aeronautical fees, state subsidies, proceeds from aeronautical heritage concessions, donations, legacies, and any other resources allocated to it.

Fees for services rendered are charged for tasks related to the supervision of civil aviation safety and security, as well as the economic oversight of aeronautical activities. Aeronautical fees are collected from airlines for services related to the operation of unlicensed air services, implementation of airport security measures, and airport development. The CCAA operates with an annual budget approved by its board of directors.

== Successive leaders ==
Date of appointment	Name
Chair of the Board of Directors
1999	PONDI Paul
November 22, 2010	NKOUE NKONGO Maximin Paul
Directors General
January 26, 2000	NTONGO ONGUENE Roger
April 25, 2002	SAMA JUMA Ignatus
January 27, 2010	TANKAM Pierre
December 30, 2015	ASSOUMOU KOKI Paule
Deputy Directors General
January 26, 2000	TANKAM Pierre
April 25, 2002	MOUSSA HABOUBA
January 27, 2010	ALLABIRA MAMADOU

== See also ==
- Kenya Airways Flight 507
