= CCAA =

CCAA may stand for:

- California Collegiate Athletic Association, an intercollegiate athletic conference in the Division II of the NCAA
- Cameroon Civil Aviation Authority, the civil aviation authority of Cameroon
- Canadian Collegiate Athletic Association, the national governing body for organized sports at colleges in Canada
- Colonia Claudia Ara Agrippinensium, the name of the Roman colony in the Rhineland out of which the German city of Cologne developed
- Companies' Creditors Arrangement Act, a statute of the Parliament of Canada that allows insolvent corporations to restructure their business and financial affairs
- Croatian Civil Aviation Agency, agency of Croatia
