= Yaoundé Airport =

Yaoundé Airport Aéroport de Yaoundé-Ville
- IATA: YAO; ICAO: FKKY

Summary
- Airport type: Public / Military
- Operator: Cameroon Air Force
- Location: Yaoundé, Cameroon
- Elevation AMSL: 2,464 ft / 751 m
- Coordinates: 03°50′10.4″N 011°31′24.3″E

Map
- Location of Yaoundé Airport in Cameroon

Runways
Direction	Length		Surface
Direction	m	ft	Surface
03/21	1,987	6,519	Asphalt
- Source: DAFIF

Yaoundé Airport (French: Aéroport de Yaoundé-Ville, IATA: YAO, ICAO: FKKY) is an airport in Yaoundé, the capital of Cameroon and a city in the Centre Province. It is also known as Yaoundé Ville Airport. It should not be confused with Yaoundé Nsimalen International Airport.

== Accidents and incidents ==
The following accidents and incidents occurred either at the airport, or involved aircraft from the airport.

- On 28 June 1989, a Cameroon Airlines Hawker Siddeley HS 748 plane from Bafoussam registered as (TJ-CCF) overshot the runway by 43 m upon landing in stormy weather at Yaounde International Airport following a scheduled flight from Douala and collided with an embankment, killing the two pilots and one of the 45 passengers on board.

== See also ==
- Cameroon Air Force
- List of airports in Cameroon
- Yaoundé Nsimalen International Airport
