= Eséka Airport =

Airport in Centre, Cameroon

- IATA: none; ICAO: FKKE

Summary
- Airport type: Public
- Serves: Eséka
- Location: Cameroon
- Elevation AMSL: 745 ft / 227 m
- Coordinates: 03°38′29.5″N 010°47′27.9″E

Map
- Location of Eséka Airport in Cameroon

Runways
Direction	Length		Surface
Direction	ft	m	Surface
16/34	1,910	582	Grass
- Source: Landings.com

Eséka Airport (ICAO: FKKE) is a public use airport located near Eséka, Centre, Cameroon.

== See also ==
- List of airports in Cameroon
