= Kaélé Airport =

Airport in Far North, Cameroon

- IATA: KLE; ICAO: FKKH

Summary
- Airport type: Public
- Serves: Kaélé
- Location: Cameroon
- Elevation AMSL: 1,276 ft (389 m)
- Coordinates: 10°5′34.4″N 014°26′40.2″E

Map
- Location of Kaélé Airport in Cameroon

Runways
Direction	Length		Surface
Direction	ft	m	Surface
10/28	4,250	1,295	Dirt
- Source: Landings.com

Kaélé Airport (IATA: KLE, ICAO: FKKH) is a public use airport located near Kaélé, Extrême-Nord, Cameroon.

== See also ==
- List of airports in Cameroon
