= Anthony Mitchell (journalist) =

Anthony Mitchell (born c. 1967–1968; died 5 May 2007) was a British journalist for the Associated Press. He was initially stationed in Ethiopia, but on 21 January 2006 he was expelled from the country by government press secretary Solomon Abebe. He then moved to Kenya.

Mitchell died on Kenya Airways Flight 507 when it crashed in Cameroon with 114 passengers and crew.

He is buried in Chertsey Cemetery in Surrey.
