= Banyo Airport =

Airport in Adamaoua, Cameroon

- IATA: none; ICAO: FKAB

Summary
- Airport type: Public
- Serves: Banyo
- Location: Cameroon
- Elevation AMSL: 3,642 ft / 1,110 m
- Coordinates: 06°46′29.5″N 011°48′27.3″E

Map
- Location of Banyo Airport in Cameroon

Runways
Direction	Length		Surface
Direction	ft	m	Surface
12/30	2,850	869	Grass
- Source: Landings.com

Banyo Airport (ICAO: FKAB) is a public use airport located near Banyo, Adamaoua, Cameroon.

== See also ==
- List of airports in Cameroon
