= Bertoua Airport =

Airport in Est, Cameroon

- IATA: BTA; ICAO: FKKO

Summary
- Airport type: Public
- Serves: Bertoua
- Location: Cameroon
- Elevation AMSL: 2,198 ft / 670 m
- Coordinates: 04°32′59.7″N 013°43′33.2″E

Map
- Location of Bertoua Airport in Cameroon

Runways
Direction	Length		Surface
Direction	ft	m	Surface
17/35	6,120	1,865	Grass

Helipads
Number	Length		Surface
Number	ft	m	Surface
1	256	78	Grass
2	128	39	Grass
- Source: Landings.com

Bertoua Airport (IATA: BTA, ICAO: FKKO) is a public use airport located 5 kilometres (3 mi) east-southeast of Bertoua, East Region, Cameroon.

Owned by Camair-Co, Bertoua Airport's first airplanes—two Xi'an MA60s—landed on its runway on 7 August 2017. Flights are offered to all regions of Cameroon besides the South and Southwest Region. The airport was expanded with more equipment by the Cameroon Civil Aviation Authority in 2018.

== See also ==
- List of airports in Cameroon
