= Kribi Airport =

Airport in Sud, Cameroon

- IATA: KBI; ICAO: FKKB

Summary
- Airport type: Public
- Serves: Kribi
- Location: Cameroon
- Elevation AMSL: 52 ft / 16 m
- Coordinates: 02°52′27.6″N 009°58′37.8″E

Map
- Location of Kribi Airport in Cameroon

Runways
Direction	Length		Surface
Direction	ft	m	Surface
03/21	6,900	2,103	Grass
- Source: Landings.com

Kribi Airport (IATA: KBI, ICAO: FKKB) is a public use airport located 10 kilometres (6 mi) southeast of Kribi, on the Gulf of Guinea, in the Océan Department, Sud Region, Cameroon.

== See also ==
- List of airports in Cameroon
