= Tiko =

Tiko, Cameroon Keka
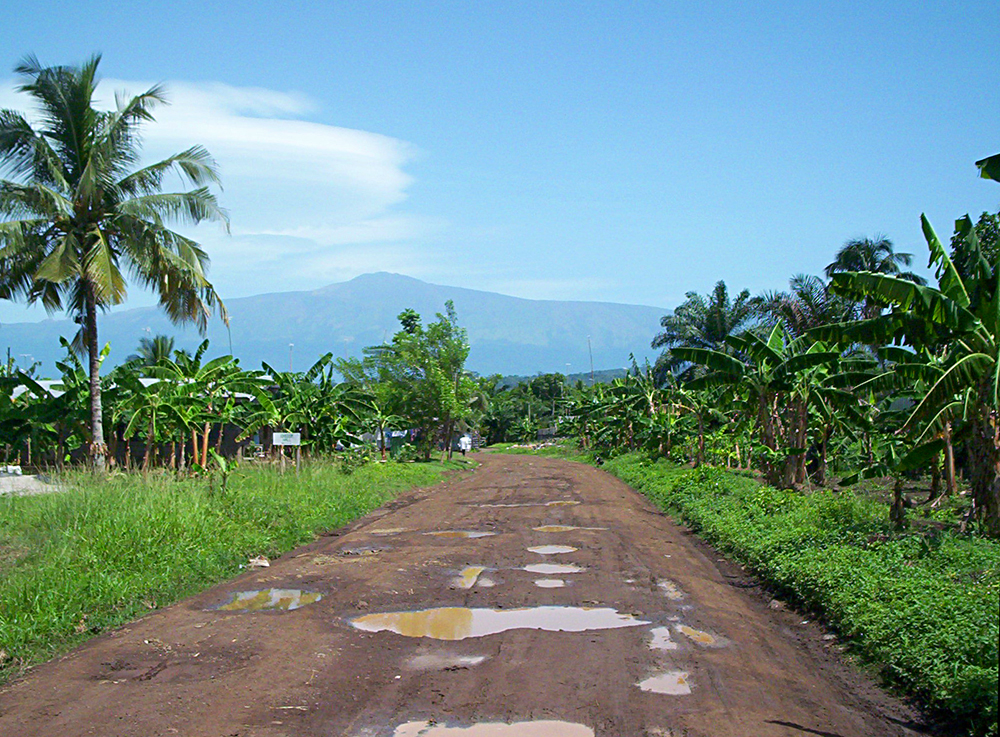
- Mount Cameroon as seen from Tiko

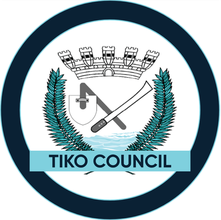
- Seal

- Location in Cameroon
- Coordinates: 4°4′30″N 9°21′36″E
- Country: Cameroon
- Region: Southwest
- Department: Fako County

Government
- Elevation: 64 m (210 ft)

Population (2012)
  - Total: 78,885

Tiko, originally called Keka by the Bakweris, is a town and important port in the southwest region of Cameroon. The settlement grew as a market town for Douala fishermen, Bakweri (Kpwe people) farmers, and hunters from Molyko, Bwenga, Bulu, and Bokova. The core quarters in Tiko include Streets 1 to 7, Motombolombo, Down Beach, New Quarter, P&T quarters, New Layout, Long Street, Likomba, Golf Club, Mutengene, and Ombe. As of 2010, the town is estimated to have a population of 55,914.

== Economy And Transport ==
Tiko is a popular destination for tourists visiting Cameroon. The town is also an industrial area which is mostly occupied by the CDC (Cameroon Development Co-operation), which produces rubber, banana, and palm oil. Tiko hosts the Tiko Golf Club, which is a popular destination for golf lovers. The Likomba Golf Course is located in Likomba which has 18 holes. During the dry season, major golf tournaments are held there, as it is one of only 2 golf courses in Cameroon.

The town is served by the one active Tiko International Airport, which served West Kamerun (Southern Cameroons) before its closure under the Yaounde Government. It was under the ownership of the Cameroon Air Transport (CAT), which was headquartered in Bota, Victoria (Southern Cameroons). It is one of the Anglophone airport that went into disuse after federation with, and later annexation by Cameroon, the others being: Bali Airport, Limbe Airport, Besongabang Airport, and Nguti Airport. Though the government's plans are underway to redevelop and rehabilitate both the Airport and the Tiko Port, delays have put the project into uncertainty.

There are two major hotels. Airport Hotel, which derived its name from the Tiko Airport, is located on Long Street. This hotel was built in the early 70s. It used to have a very popular nightclub which attracted folks and musicians not only from within but also from out of Cameroon.

3813 is the second of the two hotels. It was built around the year 2002 and is located along the Tiko-Douala road. It has a supermarket, a swimming pool, and a nightclub for dancing. Internet access is also available.

Tiko is well known for its Nigerian (Igbo people) population, as well as its organized marketplace. The Tiko Market is one of the most renowned markets in West Africa. People traveled from surrounding villages, cities, and countries to shop or conduct business in Tiko. The market is currently being rebuilt after a fire destroyed the shops on 2 March 2010.

Tiko also hosts the special forces, which explains the peace and security enjoyed by the inhabitants.

Mutengene, a small town west of Tiko, is a cross roads leading to Buea and Limbe, Cameroon (Formerly called Victoria).

The closest towns with coordinates:

- Mutengene (10 km or 6 mi W)
- Buea (17.9 km or 11 1/8 mi W/NW)
- Limbe, Cameroon (21 km or 13 mi W/SW)
- Muyuka (24 km or 15 mi N/NE)
- Bonabéri (33.2 km or 20 5/8 mi E)
- Dibombari (34.7 km or 21 1/2 mi E/NE)
- Douala (37.7 km or 23 3/8 mi E)
- Idenao or Idenau (46.7 km or 29 mi W/NW)
- Mbanga or Mabanga (52.7 km or 32 3/4 mi N/NE)
- Kumba (62.7 km or 39 mi N)
- West: By Limbe, Cameroon city Council up to the Ombe River bridge
- North West: By Buea Council up to Dibanda
- North East: By Muyuka Council
- East: By Dibombari Council in Mungo people Division
- South: By Bonaberi Duala (or Douala) Sub Divisional Urban Council

== Facilities ==
Tiko is home to many colleges, including Christ the King College, GBHS, Imperial Academy of Arts and Science (IMPASS), Sure Foundation Comprehensive College, and Plive College.

Tiko United FC is Tiko's most famous football club. Tiko United is the first club west of the Mongo to have won the championship title since its inception some 50 years ago.

== Plantation railways ==
Plantations in the Tiko area were originally served by narrow gauge plantation railways.

== Notable persons ==
- Sofoklis Schortsanitis, basketball player for Trikala Aries B.C. in Greece.
- Mbella Sonne Dipoko
- Salatiel
