= Bali Airport =

Airport in Northwest, Cameroon

- IATA: BLC; ICAO: FKKG

Summary
- Airport type: Public
- Serves: Bali
- Location: Cameroon
- Elevation AMSL: 4,437 ft / 1,352 m
- Coordinates: 05°53′43.3″N 010°2′2.0″E

Map
- Location of Bali Airport in Cameroon

Runways
Direction	Length		Surface
Direction	ft	m	Surface
05/23	4,380	1,335	Grass
- Source: Landings.com

Bali Airport (IATA: BLC, ICAO: FKKG) is a public use airport located 2 kilometres (1 mi) northeast of Bali, Northwest Region, Cameroon.

== See also ==
- List of airports in Cameroon
