= Ebolowa Airport =

Airport in Sud, Cameroon

- IATA: EBW; ICAO: FKKW

Summary
- Airport type: Public
- Serves: Ebolowa
- Location: Cameroon
- Elevation AMSL: 2,060 ft (630 m)
- Coordinates: 02°52′38.6″N 011°11′3.0″E

Map
- Location of Ebolowa Airport in Cameroon

Runways
Direction	Length		Surface
Direction	ft	m	Surface
07/25	4,100	1,250	Grass
- Source: Landings.com

Ebolowa Airport (IATA: EBW, ICAO: FKKW) is a public use airport located 6 kilometres (4 mi) southeast of Ebolowa, Sud, Cameroon. Google Earth satellite imagery shows the airstrip is overgrown with vegetation.

== See also ==
- List of airports in Cameroon
