= Limbe Airport =

Airport in Southwest, Cameroon

- IATA: ~~VCC~~; ICAO: none

Summary
- Airport type: Public
- Serves: Limbe
- Location: Cameroon
- Elevation AMSL: 381 ft / 116 m
- Coordinates: 04°00′57″N 009°12′00″E

Map
- Location of Limbe Airport in Cameroon
- Source: Landings.com

Limbe Airport (IATA: ~~VCC~~) was a public use airport located 1 kilometre (1 mi) southeast of Limbe, Sud-Ouest, Cameroon.

== See also ==
- List of airports in Cameroon
