= Dschang Airport =

Airport in West, Cameroon

- IATA: DSC; ICAO: FKKS

Summary
- Airport type: Public
- Serves: Dschang
- Location: Cameroon
- Elevation AMSL: 4,619 ft / 1,408 m
- Coordinates: 05°26′50.9″N 010°4′4.6″E

Map
- Location of Dschang Airport in Cameroon

Runways
Direction	Length		Surface
Direction	ft	m	Surface
10/28	3,130	954	Dirt
- Source: Landings.com

Dschang Airport (IATA: DSC, ICAO: FKKS) is a public use airport located 0 kilometres (0 mi) south-southeast of Dschang, Ouest, Cameroon.

== See also ==
- List of airports in Cameroon
