= Cameroon Air Force =

Air warfare branch of Cameroon's military

- Armée de l'Air du Cameroun
- Badge of the Cameroon Air Force
- Founded: 1 January 1961; 65 years ago
- Country: Cameroon
- Type: Air force
- Role: Aerial warfare
- Size: 31 aircraft in service
- Part of: Cameroon Armed Forces

Commanders
- Commander-in-Chief: President Paul Biya
- Air Force Commander: Brigadier General Momha Jean Calvin

Insignia
- Roundel

Aircraft flown
- Attack: Dornier Alpha Jet, Aermacchi MB-326
- Trainer: Humbert Tétras
- Transport: CN-235, C-130 Hercules, Gulfstream III

The Cameroon Air Force (French: Armée de l'Air du Cameroun, AdAC) is the air force of Cameroon. The Cameroon Air Force, along with the Cameroon Army, the Cameroon Navy (including the Naval Infantry), the National Gendarmerie, and the Presidential Guard make up the Cameroonian Armed Forces.

The Cameroon Air Force (Armée de l'Air du Cameroun) theoretically possesses a fairly well balanced force of relatively unsophisticated aircraft, although many of these are now ageing and serviceability levels are likely to be low. Emphasis is placed on transport and utility operations in support of ground forces. Combat capability is modest and restricted to a few armed trainers that can be used for ground attack, COIN and close air support roles. Six Atlas Impala jet trainers purchased from South Africa in 1997 had a lengthy gestation period before becoming operational and did not enter service until late 1998. None of the Impalas are currently in service. Apart from a few ultralight aircraft, these are the most recent additions to the inventory. Cameroon's air arm lacks training aircraft and has also experienced a significant decline in transport assets, most recently involving the 2001 grounding of the remaining three DHC-5D Buffalo aircraft. As with other regional air forces, few aircraft have been procured since the end of the oil boom in the early 1980s and the burden is beginning to show on equipment that is now at least two decades old.

== Organization ==
The Cameroon Air Force was established on 1 January 1961 as National Squadron (Escadrille Nationale), one year after gaining independence. The French supplied the first equipment, which was three Max Holste MH.1521M Broussard. In 1964 the air force was renamed National Aviation (Aviation Nationale), and in 1966 Cameroon Air Force (Armée de l'Air du Cameroun). Later orders from France included the Alouette II, Alouette III and Gazelle helicopters, and Fouga Magister and Dassault-Dornier Alpha Jet jet trainers. In 1977 two Lockheed C-130 Hercules entered service. Following that four turboprop de Havilland Canada DHC-5 Buffalos were ordered in 1981. In 1982 three twin turboprop Dornier 128s entered service for the maritime patrol role.

The first combat action of Cameroon Air Force was during an attempt of a coup in April 1984, when the air force remained loyal to president Paul Biya.

The air force includes three main aerial bases, in Yaoundé, Douala, and Garoua (Cameroonian Air Force Base 301). The air force staff is divided between these three bases, located within each military region. The Yaoundé base is a helicopter and liaison platform; the Douala base is a logistical and tactical transport platform; the Garoua base is an attack and training platform. The first two bases are timeworn. There are no stopping systems, no radio-navigation installations, and no lighting apparatus. No major investment has been made for a long time. The Garoua base is the more modern and the best equipped and "conforms" to NATO standards having been built by the Germans, following an invitation to tender. The PANVR (Pole Aeronautique National a Vocation Regionale) is located on this base. Large aeroplanes can land easily on this base. However, the site is not well maintained.

The Koutaba aerodrome is home to the Bataillon des Troupes Aeroportees (BTAP).

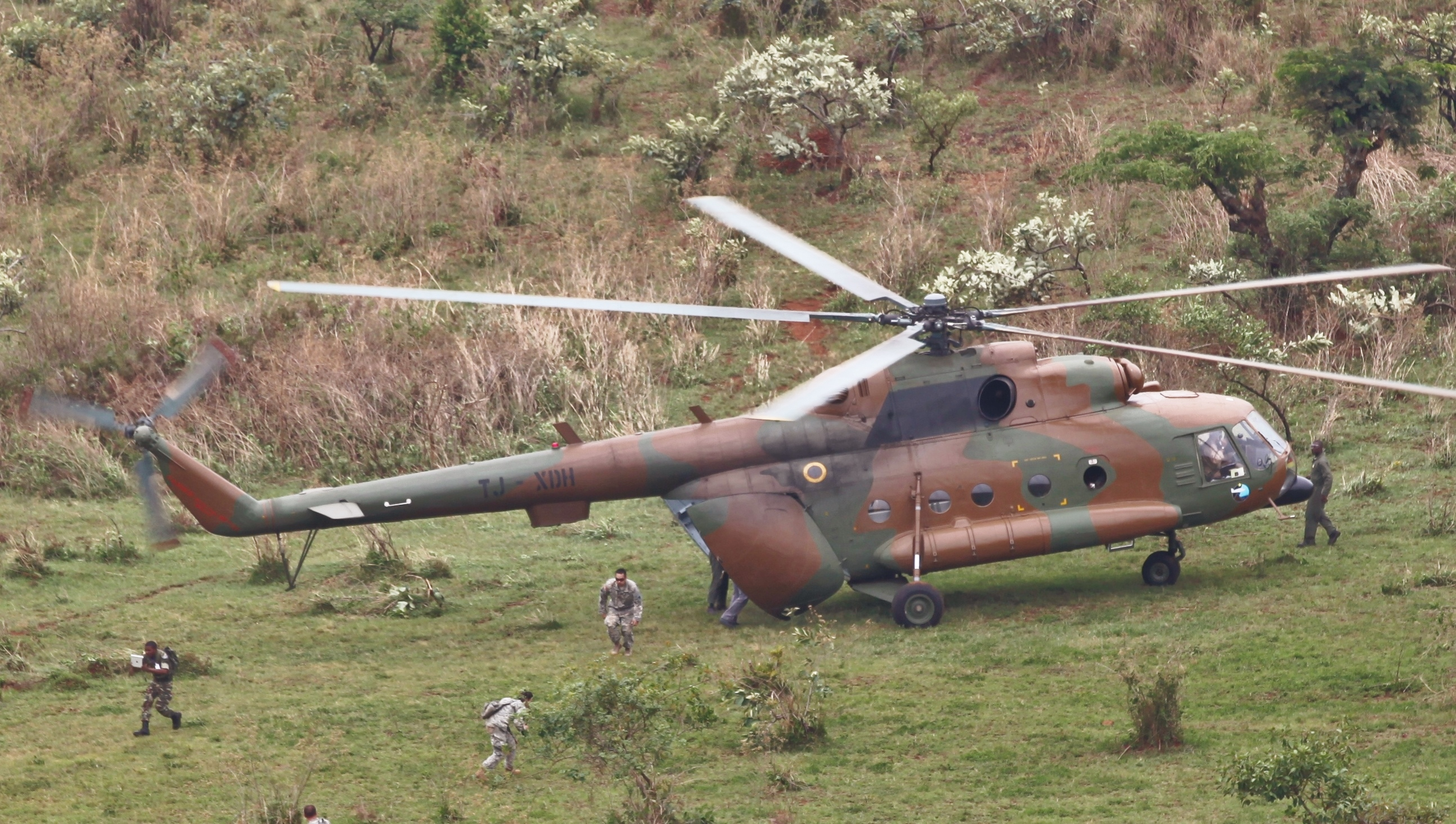
US Soldiers with the exit an Mi-17 during Central Accord 2014

Finally, the Bamenda aerodrome could become a fourth aerial base, with the stationing of the airborne rifle commandos (fusiliers commando de l’air – BAFUSCO AIR): currently 60 people under the command of a lieutenant colonel assisted by eight officers work at the site. Such a deployment is large by Cameroonian standards.

Currently, the air force has 6 Dassault/Dornier Alpha Jets (2 are currently inoperable) as attack aircraft; 3 Lockheed C-130 Hercules and 1 Aérospatiale SA 330 Puma transport aircraft, 1 Piper PA-23, 1 Aérospatiale Alouette II, 2 Joker 300, 7 Humbert Tétras for training and 2 Bell 206 as observation and liaison aircraft.

The independently operated Presidential aerial squadron has 1 Grumman Gulfstream III, 1 Aérospatiale Dauphin and 1 Aérospatiale Super Puma, which are not part of air force equipment. Maintenance of aircraft of this squadron is better than for those of the air force.

== Personnel ==
=== Training ===
Basic training for airmen is provided at Koutaba. Non-commissioned officers and officers undergo training at the PANVR, which is also a regional school where pilots from other African countries can train. The purpose of the school is to prepare them for the examination for the French air school (CSEA) in Salon-de-Provence. However, Cameroonian pilot officers also undergo training in other countries such as Morocco and the USA.

=== Officers ===
The Cameroon Air Force has the following rank structure:

==== General officers ====
- General, Général d'armée aérienne
- Lieutenant General, Général de corps d'armée aérienne
- Major General, Général de division aérienne
- Brigadier General, Général de brigade aérienne

==== Other officers ====
- Colonel, Colonel
- Lieutenant Colonel, Lieutenant-colonel
- Major, Commandant
- Captain, Capitaine
- 1st Lieutenant, Lieutenant
- 2nd Lieutenant, Sous-lieutenant

==== Non-commissioned officers ====
- Senior Warrant Officer, Adjudant-chef
- Warrant Officer, Adjudant
- Master Sergeant, Sergent-chef
- Sergeant, Sergent
- Master Corporal, Caporal-chef
- Corporal, Caporal

==== Airmen ====
- Private 1st Class, Soldat de 1^{re} classe

== Aircraft ==
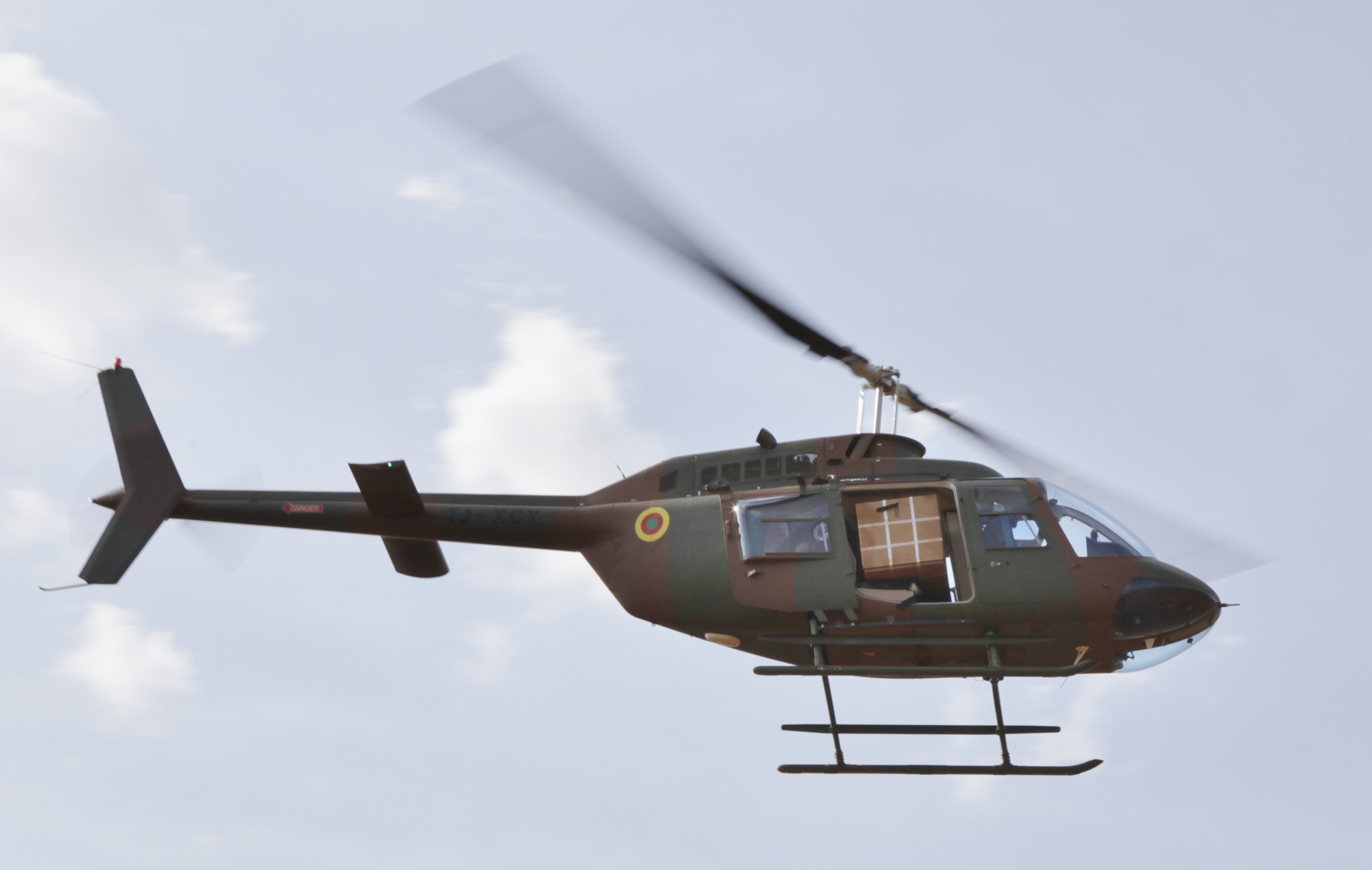
A Cameroonian Bell 206 flies over Koutaba during exercise Pathfinder 2014

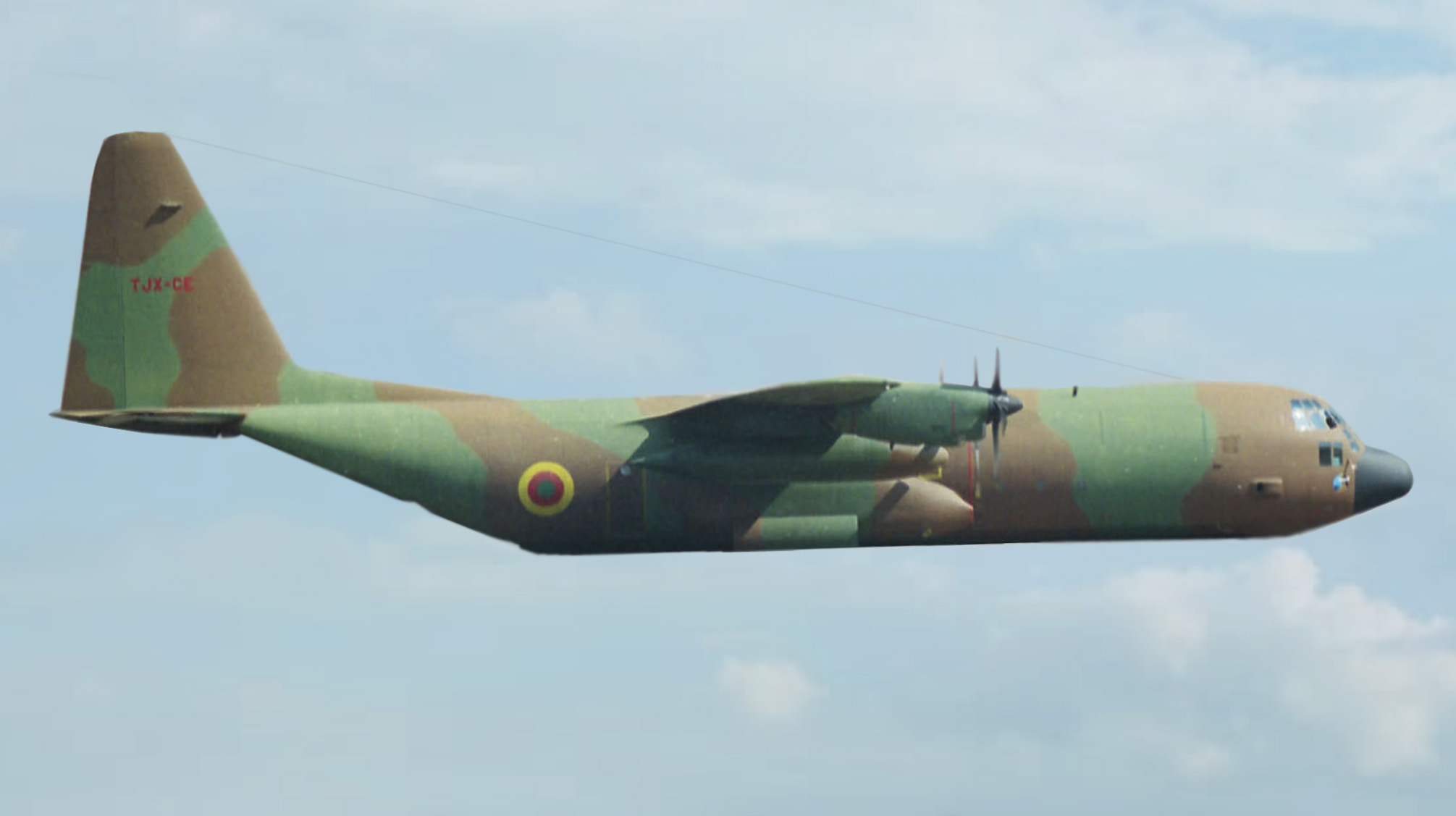
A Cameroon C-130H

=== Current inventory ===
Aircraft	Origin	Type	Variant	In service	Notes
Transport
Xian MA60	China	Transport		1	
Cessna 208	United States	Transport	208EX	3	two aircraft used ISR missions
CASA CN-235	Spain / Indonesia	Transport		1	
C-130 Hercules	United States	Transport	C-130H	3	
Helicopters
Bell 206	United States	Utility		1	
Bell 412	United States	Utility		1	
Mil Mi-17	Russia	Transport		5	
Harbin Z-9	China	Utility		3	
Alouette II	France	Liaison / Light utility		1	
SA330 Puma	France	Transport / Utility		2	
AgustaWestland AW109	Italy	Utility		4	
Trainer aircraft
Alpha Jet	Germany / France	Jet trainer / Light attack		6	

=== Former aircraft ===
Previous aircraft flown included the CM.170 Magister, Dornier Do 28/128 DHC Caribou, Douglas C-47, Hawker Siddeley HS 748, Max Holste Broussard, Piper PA-23, SA 315B Lama and the Alouette III helicopter.
