= Batouri Airport =

Airport in Est, Cameroon

- IATA: OUR; ICAO: FKKI

Summary
- Airport type: Public
- Serves: Batouri
- Location: Cameroon
- Elevation AMSL: 2,152 ft / 656 m
- Coordinates: 04°28′38.5″N 014°21′47.3″E

Map
- Location of Batouri Airport in Cameroon

Runways
Direction	Length		Surface
Direction	ft	m	Surface
02/20	4,660	1,420	Grass
- Source: Landings.com

Batouri Airport (IATA: OUR, ICAO: FKKI) is a public use airport located 5 kilometres (3 mi) north of Batouri, Est, Cameroon.

== Gallery ==
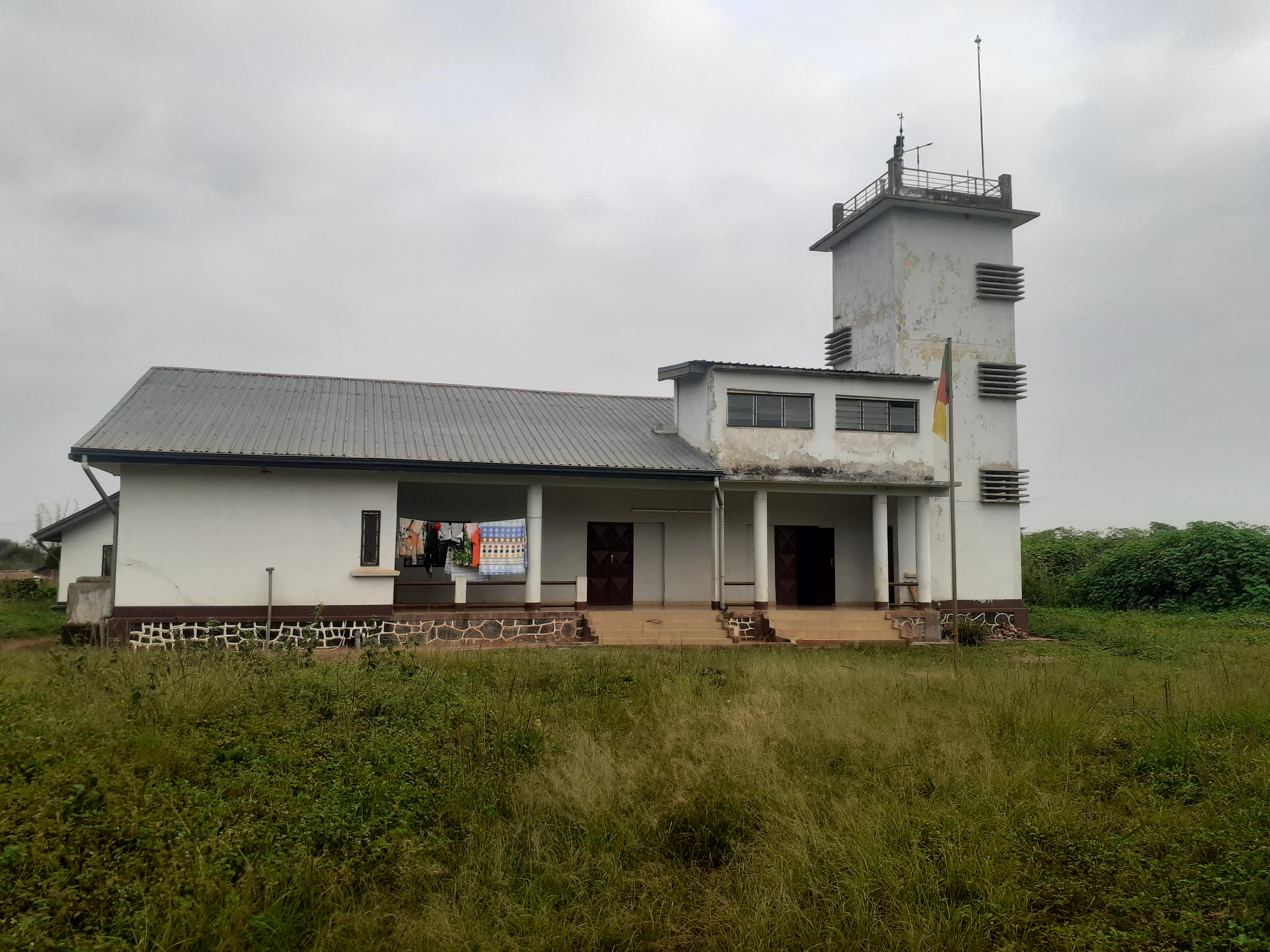

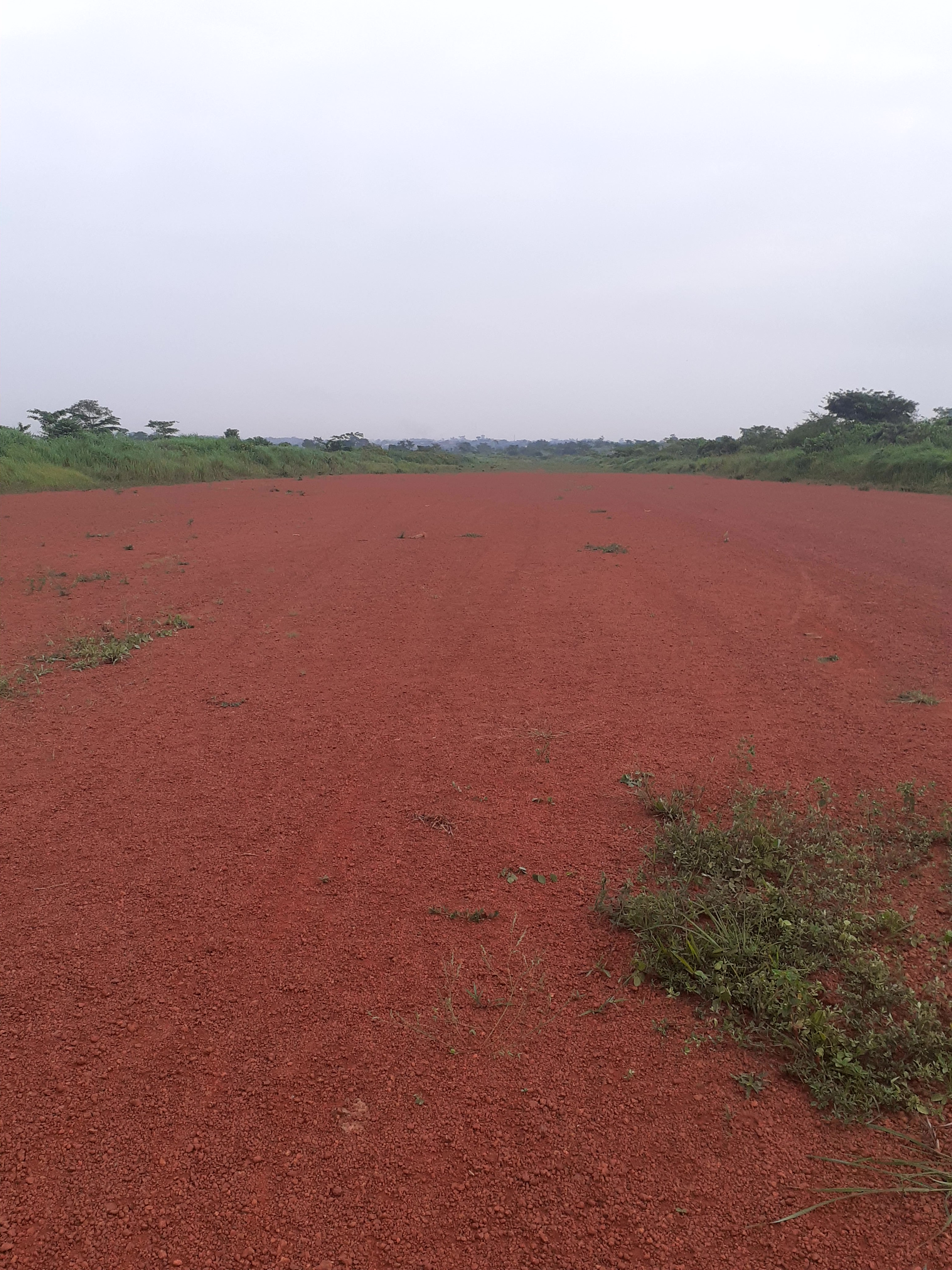

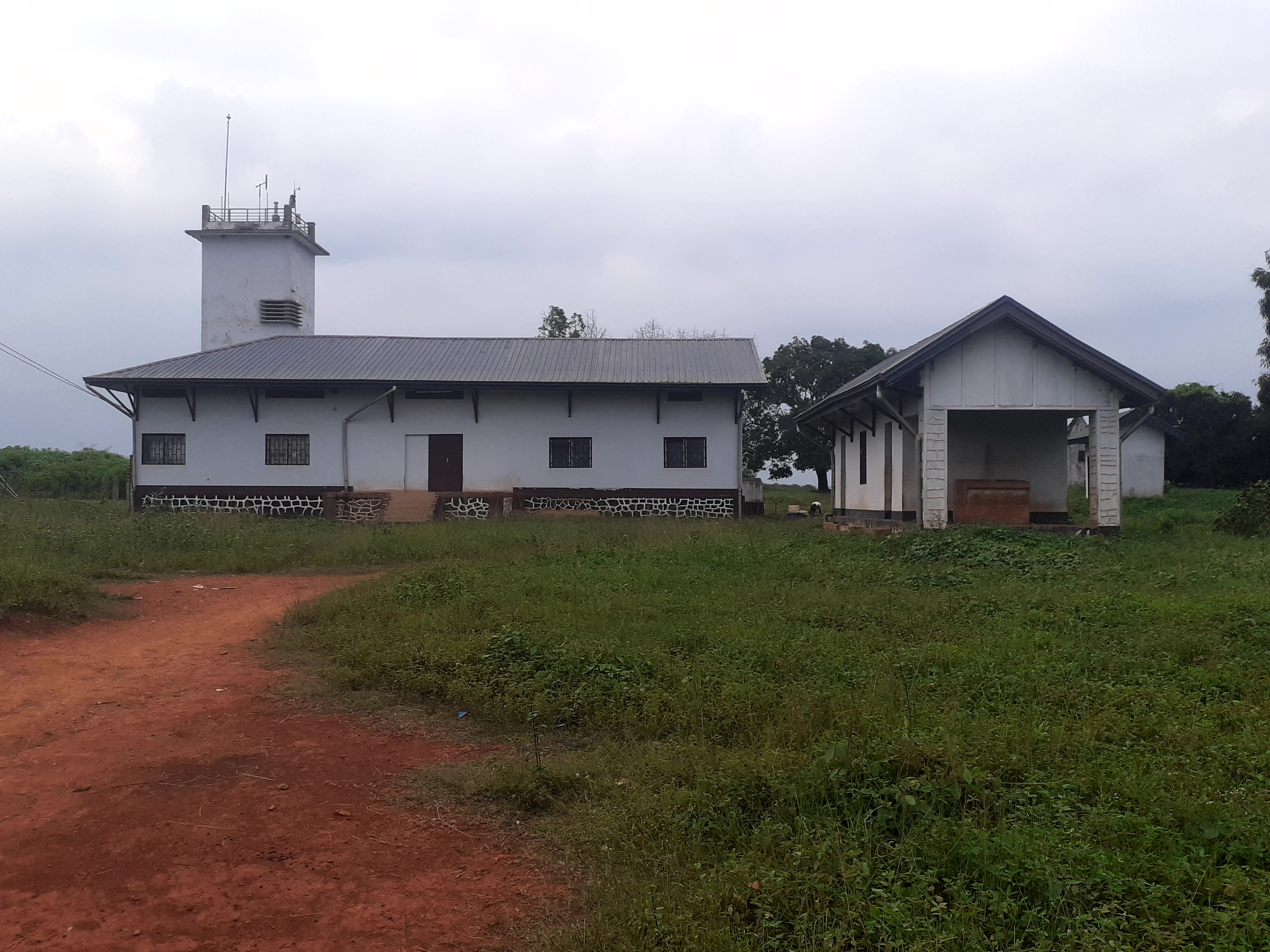

== See also ==
- List of airports in Cameroon
