= Tiko Airport =

Airport in Southwest, Cameroon

- IATA: TKC; ICAO: FKKC

Summary
- Airport type: Public
- Operator: Government
- Serves: Tiko, Cameroon
- Elevation AMSL: 151 ft (46 m)
- Coordinates: 4°05′20″N 9°21′35″E

Map
- Location of Tiko Airport in Cameroon

Runways
Direction	Length		Surface
Direction	m	ft	Surface
05/23	1,375	4,511	Asphalt
- Source: DAFIF GCM

Tiko Airport (IATA: TKC, ICAO: FKKC) is an airport that served Tiko, a town in the Southwest Region of Cameroon.

The Tiko non-directional beacon (Ident: TI) is located on the field.

Tiko Airport was closed under the Yaounde Government. It was announced in 2022 that the airport would be relocated to a new site in Misselele.

== See also ==
- Transport in Cameroon
- List of airports in Cameroon
