= Ebolowa =

City in Cameroon; capital of South Region

- City
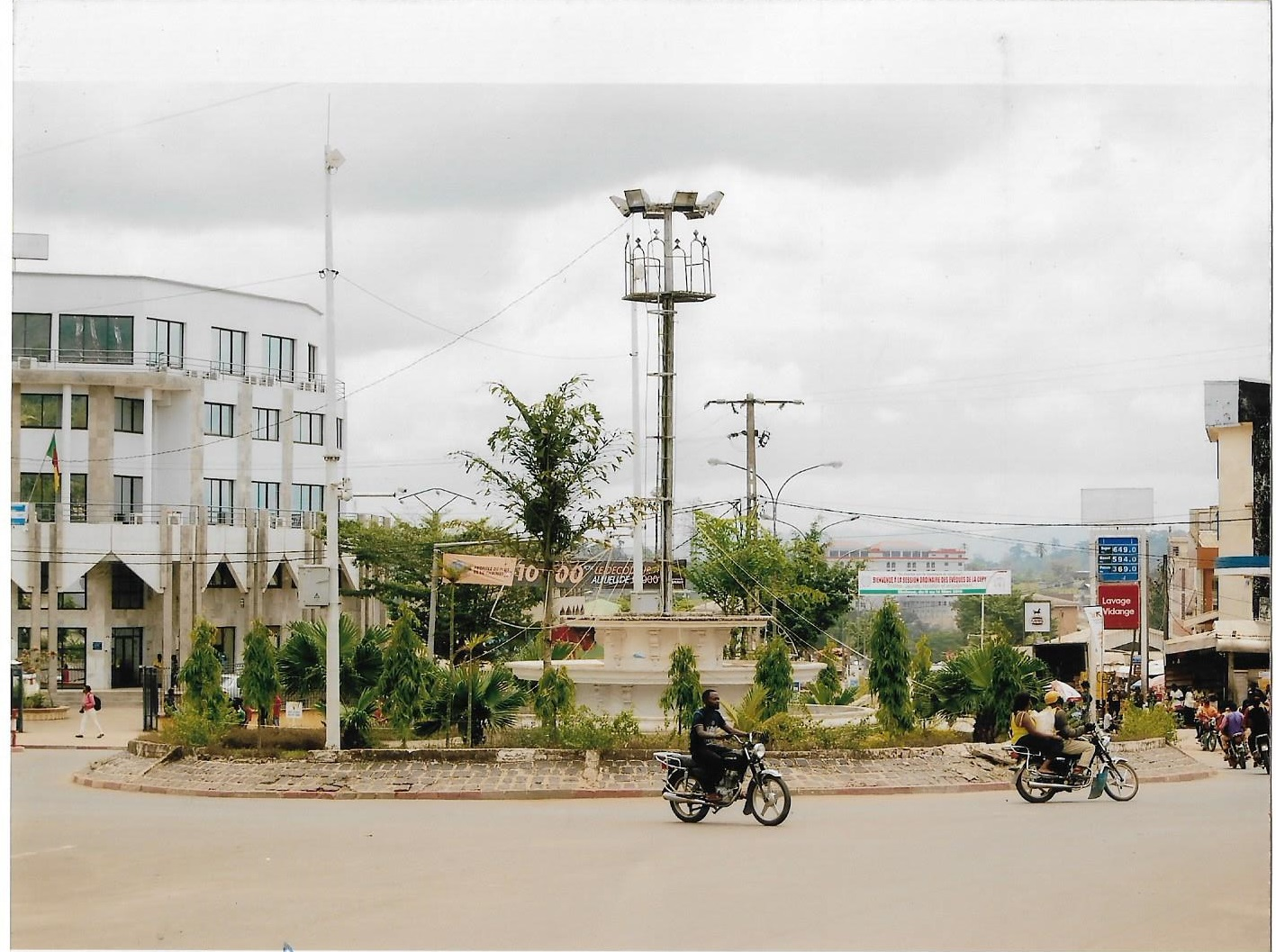
- Ebolowa in 2019

- Location in Cameroon
- Coordinates: 2°55′N 11°9′E
- Country: Cameroon
- Region: South
- Department: Mvila

Area
  - Total: 1,500 km^{2} (580 sq mi)
- Elevation: 636 m (2,087 ft)

Population (2012)
  - Total: 76,885
  - Density: 51/km^{2} (130/sq mi)

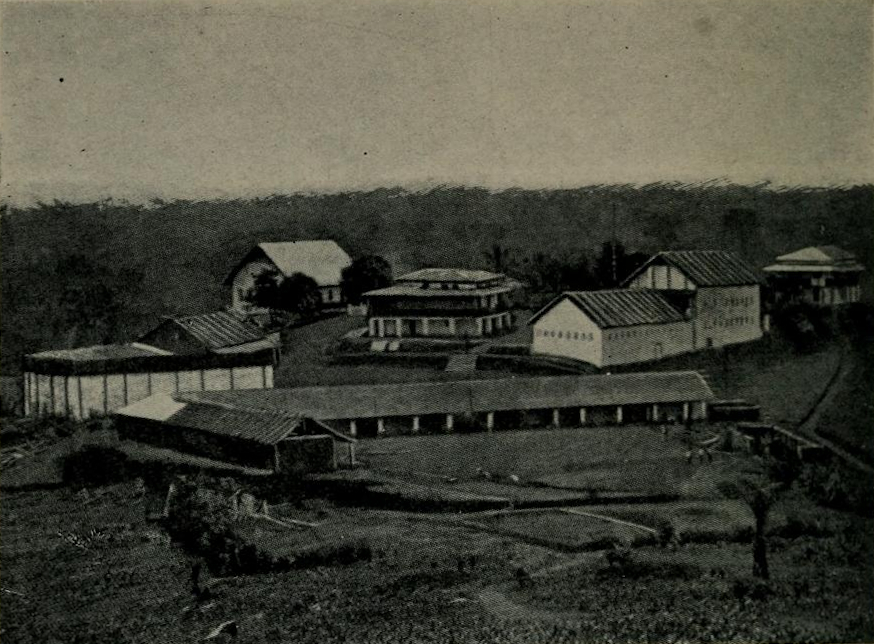
Ebolowa in 1917

Ebolowa is a city in Cameroon. It is the capital of the South Region and the Mvila department. Its economy is primarily agricultural, with cocoa bean being its main crop.

== Economy ==
=== Agriculture ===
Agriculture is the primary industry of Ebolowa, with about 80% of the population working in the industry. The city has a fruit tree nursey which grows and transports 2,500 seeds annually.

Ebolowa's main crop is cocoa bean, and in 2024, a planned Puratos cocoa factory in the city was announced, alongside one in Obala. Another processing plant—composed of three buildings—was agreed upon between mayor André Thomas Bengon and Takaoka Nozomu, the Japanese ambassador to Cameroon. The agreement was sponsored by minister of commerce Luc Magloire Atangana Mbarga.

On 13 November 2024, operation of a tractor manufacturing plant in Ebolowa was granted to Cameroon's National Center for Studies and Experimentation of Agricultural Machinery (Ceneema), a company that studies and adapts agricultural machinery. The deal was agreed upon by Ceneema executive Andrée Caroline Mélanie Ekotto Minkouna, and minister of finance Alamine Ousmane Mey, as well as receiving support from the Exim Bank of India.

=== Bushmeat ===
Situated 60 kilometers east of Campo Ma'an National Park, Ebolowa is a center in the Cameroonian bushmeat trade. Pangolin is often sold as bushmeat, with 10.3% of the city's residents said they eat pangolin at least once month in 2024, down from 2022, which was 14.1%.

=== Logging ===
Illegal logging occurs in nearby forests. There is a sawmill in Ebolowa which processed 5,000 cubic meters of lumber monthly. In 2016, Cameroon United Forests planned to acquire the sawmill.

== Transportation ==
Ebolowa is connected to Yaoundé with a 168-kilometer northward paved road, as well as another paced road running south through Ambam and into Equatorial Guinea and Gabon. In 2025, the Cameroonian government planned to construct a road from Ebolowa to Kribi, costing an estimated CFA$137,000,000,000 and measuring 179 kilometers in length.

It is served by Ebolowa Airport.

== Climate ==
Ebolowa has a borderline tropical savanna (Köppen Aw)/tropical monsoon climate (Am) with consistently very warm to hot temperatures, a short dry season in December and January, and two rainfall peaks in April and October.

Climate data for Ebolowa (1981–2010)
Month	Jan	Feb	Mar	Apr	May	Jun	Jul	Aug	Sep	Oct	Nov	Dec	Year
Mean daily maximum °C (°F)	29.3 (84.7)	30.1 (86.2)	29.8 (85.6)	29.4 (84.9)	28.9 (84.0)	27.7 (81.9)	26.5 (79.7)	26.5 (79.7)	27.5 (81.5)	27.8 (82.0)	28.3 (82.9)	28.5 (83.3)	28.4 (83.0)
Mean daily minimum °C (°F)	22.3 (72.1)	20.3 (68.5)	20.2 (68.4)	20.3 (68.5)	20.3 (68.5)	20.1 (68.2)	19.6 (67.3)	19.6 (67.3)	19.2 (66.6)	19.8 (67.6)	20.1 (68.2)	20.2 (68.4)	20.2 (68.3)
Average rainfall mm (inches)	31.1 (1.22)	62.3 (2.45)	158.1 (6.22)	206.1 (8.11)	197.8 (7.79)	141.5 (5.57)	60.8 (2.39)	115.5 (4.55)	215.3 (8.48)	293.3 (11.55)	167.4 (6.59)	37.4 (1.47)	1,686.6 (66.39)
Source: World Meteorological Organization

== See also ==
- Communes of Cameroon
