= Foumban Nkounja Airport =

Airport in West, Cameroon

- IATA: FOM; ICAO: FKKM

Summary
- Airport type: Public
- Operator: Government
- Serves: Foumban, Cameroon
- Location: Koutaba
- Elevation AMSL: 3,966 ft (1,209 m)
- Coordinates: 05°38′13″N 010°45′03″E
- Interactive map of Foumban Nkounja Airport

Runways
Direction	Length		Surface
Direction	m	ft	Surface
04/22	2,100	6,889	Asphalt
- Source: DAFIF

Foumban Nkounja Airport (IATA: FOM, ICAO: FKKM) is an airport serving Foumban, a city in the Noun Department of the West Province in Cameroon. It is also known as Foumban Airport. The airport is located southwest of Foumban in Koutaba. Some sources also wrongly refer to it as the Koutaba Airport (IATA: KOB).
