= Mamfe Airport =

Airport in Southwest, Cameroon

- IATA: MMFA; ICAO: FKKF

Summary
- Airport type: Public
- Serves: Mamfe
- Location: Cameroon
- Elevation AMSL: 413 ft / 126 m
- Coordinates: 05°42′16.2″N 009°18′20.8″E

Map
- Location of Mamfe Airport in Cameroon

Runways
| Direction | Length | | Surface |
| Direction | m | ft | Surface |
|---|---|---|---|
| 08/26 | 1,370 | 4,495 | Grass |
- Source: Landings.com

Mamfe Airport (IATA: MMF, ICAO: FKKF) is a public use airport located 5 kilometres (3 mi) south of Mamfe, Sud-Ouest, Cameroon. The airport is actually found in Besongabang – a village about 5 km (3 mi) from Mamfe town. The Cameroon military base in Besongabang shares the airport.

== See also ==
- List of airports in Cameroon
