= Yagoua Airport =

Airport in Far North, Cameroon

- IATA: GXX; ICAO: FKKJ

Summary
- Airport type: Public
- Serves: Yagoua
- Location: Cameroon
- Elevation AMSL: 1,070 ft / 326 m
- Coordinates: 10°21′23.5″N 015°14′15.7″E

Map
- Location of Yagoua Airport in Cameroon

Runways
Direction	Length		Surface
Direction	ft	m	Surface
12/30	5,340	1,628	Grass
- Source: Landings.com

Yagoua Airport (IATA: GXX, ICAO: FKKJ) is a public use airport located near Yagoua, Extrême-Nord, Cameroon.

== See also ==
- List of airports in Cameroon
