= Bafoussam Airport =

Airport in West, Cameroon

- IATA: BFX; ICAO: FKKU

Summary
- Airport type: Public
- Operator: Government
- Location: Bafoussam, Cameroon
- Elevation AMSL: 4,347 ft / 1,325 m
- Coordinates: 05°32′12″N 010°21′16″E
- Interactive map of Bafoussam Airport

Runways
Direction	Length		Surface
Direction	m	ft	Surface
15/33	2,500	8,203	Asphalt
- Source: DAFIF

Bafoussam Airport (IATA: BFX, ICAO: FKKU) is an airport serving Bafoussam, capital of the West Province of Cameroon.

== Airlines and destinations ==
Airlines	Destinations
Camair-Co	Douala
