= Bertoua =

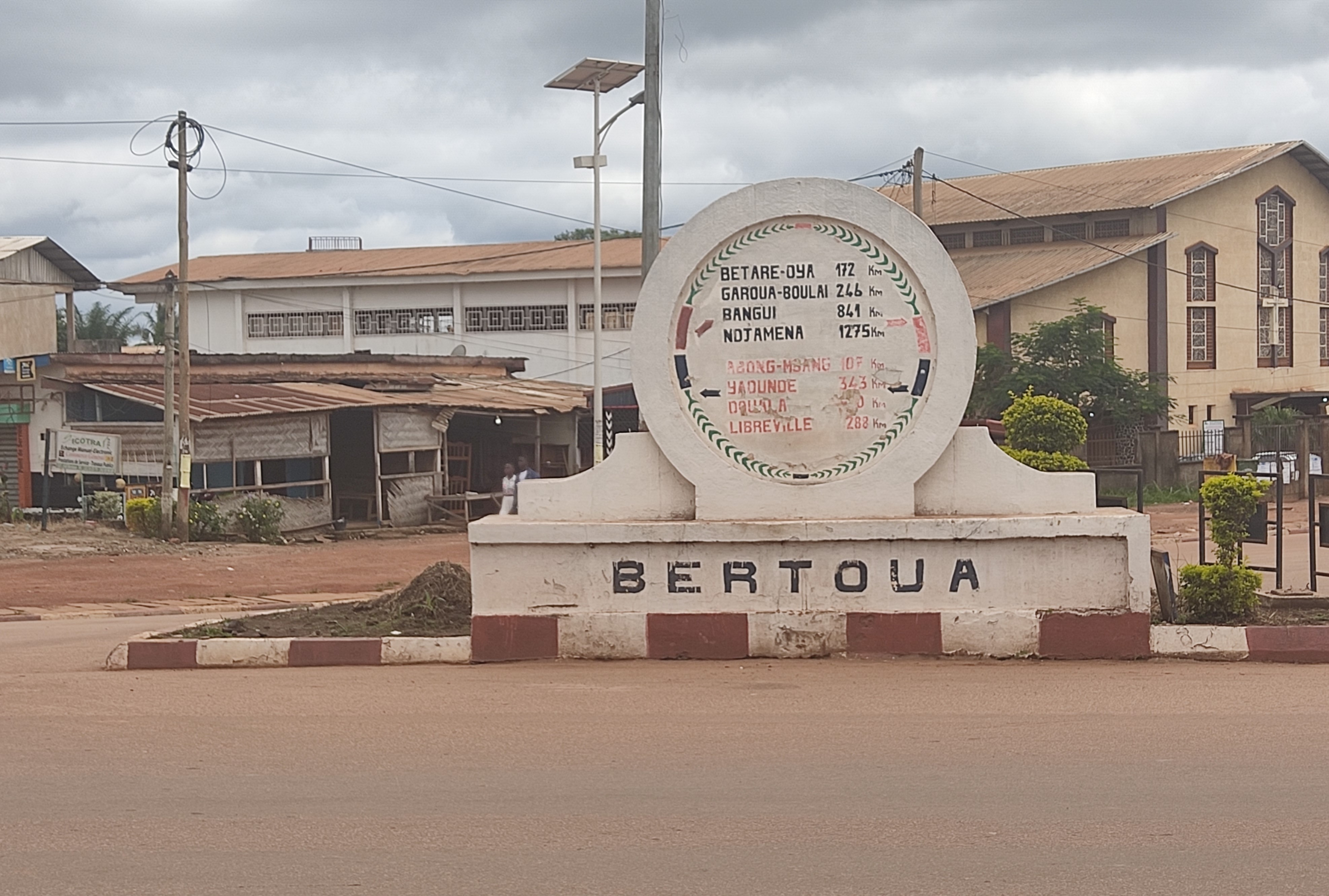
- Bertoua in 2021

- Location in Cameroon
- Coordinates: 4°35′N 13°41′E
- Country: Cameroon
- Region: East Region
- Founded: 1927

Government
  - Mayor: Pascal Masoma
  - Deputy Mayor: Gauthier Ntsama
  - City Manager: Jean-Yves Bwanga

Area
  - Total: 100 km^{2} (39 sq mi)
- Elevation: 717 m (2,352 ft)

Population (2005)census
  - Total: 88,462
  - Density: 880/km^{2} (2,300/sq mi)
- Climate: Aw

Bertoua is a city in Cameroon. It is the capital of the East Region of the Lom-et-Djerem Department. It has a population of 88,462 (at the 2005 Census), and is the traditional home of the Gbaya people. It is home to Mission Cameroon (in Polish: Misja Kamerun) of Polish Dominican Order.

In 2014, the hospital in Bertoua served refugees from the Central African Republic crossing into Cameroon at border towns such as Gbiti.

== Economy ==
=== Agriculture ===
Agriculture is the primary industry of Bertoua. In 2020, the Institute of Agricultural Research for Development planted 300,000 cashew seeds in Bertoua, creating a 3,000-hectare plantation.

== Transport ==
Cameroon National Highway 1 runs through Bertoua. Bertoua Airport—operated by Camair-Co—serves Bertoua.

== Climate ==
The climate is a tropical savanna climate (Koppen: Aw).

Climate data for Bertoua (1981–2010)
Month	Jan	Feb	Mar	Apr	May	Jun	Jul	Aug	Sep	Oct	Nov	Dec	Year
Mean daily maximum °C (°F)	30.1 (86.2)	31.7 (89.1)	31.6 (88.9)	30.6 (87.1)	29.8 (85.6)	28.3 (82.9)	27.2 (81.0)	27.4 (81.3)	28.3 (82.9)	28.9 (84.0)	29.6 (85.3)	29.3 (84.7)	29.4 (84.9)
Mean daily minimum °C (°F)	14.1 (57.4)	18.1 (64.6)	19.4 (66.9)	19.8 (67.6)	19.5 (67.1)	19.3 (66.7)	19.0 (66.2)	19.2 (66.6)	19.1 (66.4)	19.0 (66.2)	18.2 (64.8)	16.8 (62.2)	18.5 (65.2)
Average rainfall mm (inches)	15.4 (0.61)	26.9 (1.06)	95.7 (3.77)	137.9 (5.43)	160.0 (6.30)	149.5 (5.89)	110.9 (4.37)	151.2 (5.95)	218.2 (8.59)	265.8 (10.46)	90.7 (3.57)	21.6 (0.85)	1,443.8 (56.85)
Source: World Meteorological Organization

== See also ==
- Communes of Cameroon
- Archdiocese of Bertoua
