= Koutaba =

Town and commune in Cameroon

Coordinates: 5°42′N 10°49′E

- Commune and town
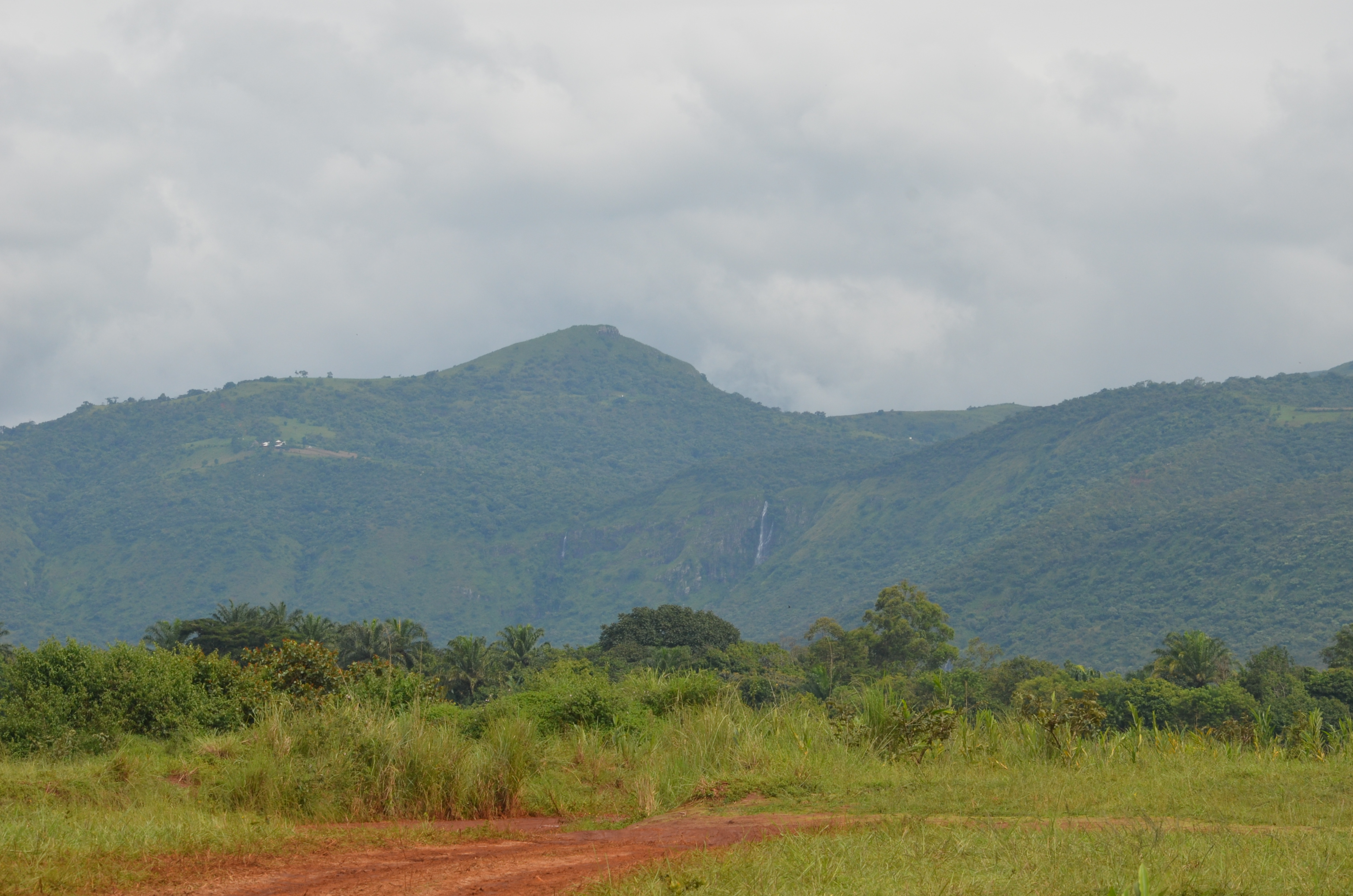
- Mountainous landscape around Koutaba.
- Interactive map of Koutaba
- Country: Cameroon
- Time zone: UTC+1 (WAT)

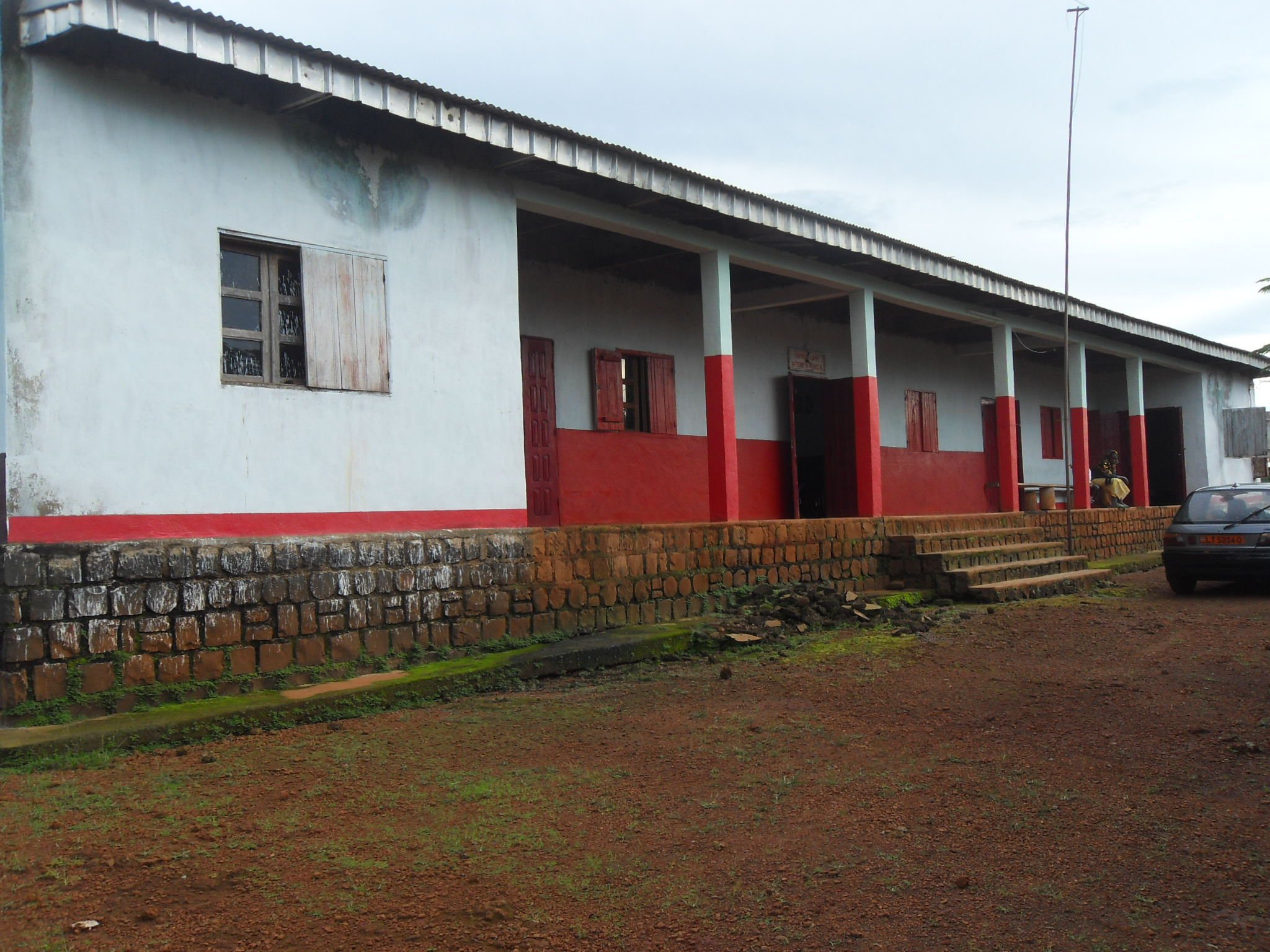
Hospital in Koutaba

Koutaba is a town and commune in Cameroon. Koutaba is known for its natural environment, but it also has modern infrastructure and ongoing development. There is more in Koutaba than the dangerous jungles with mating zebras surrounding a largely fictionalised military academy depicted in the short Cameroonian thriller Bleeding Stubs. For instance, Nkalih Mefire et al. highlight Koutaba's rich kaolin deposits, while Mediebou Chindji examines the potential of land-tenure security to encourage agricultural investment.

== Gallery ==
Koutaba Mountain in Noun locality in western Cameroon

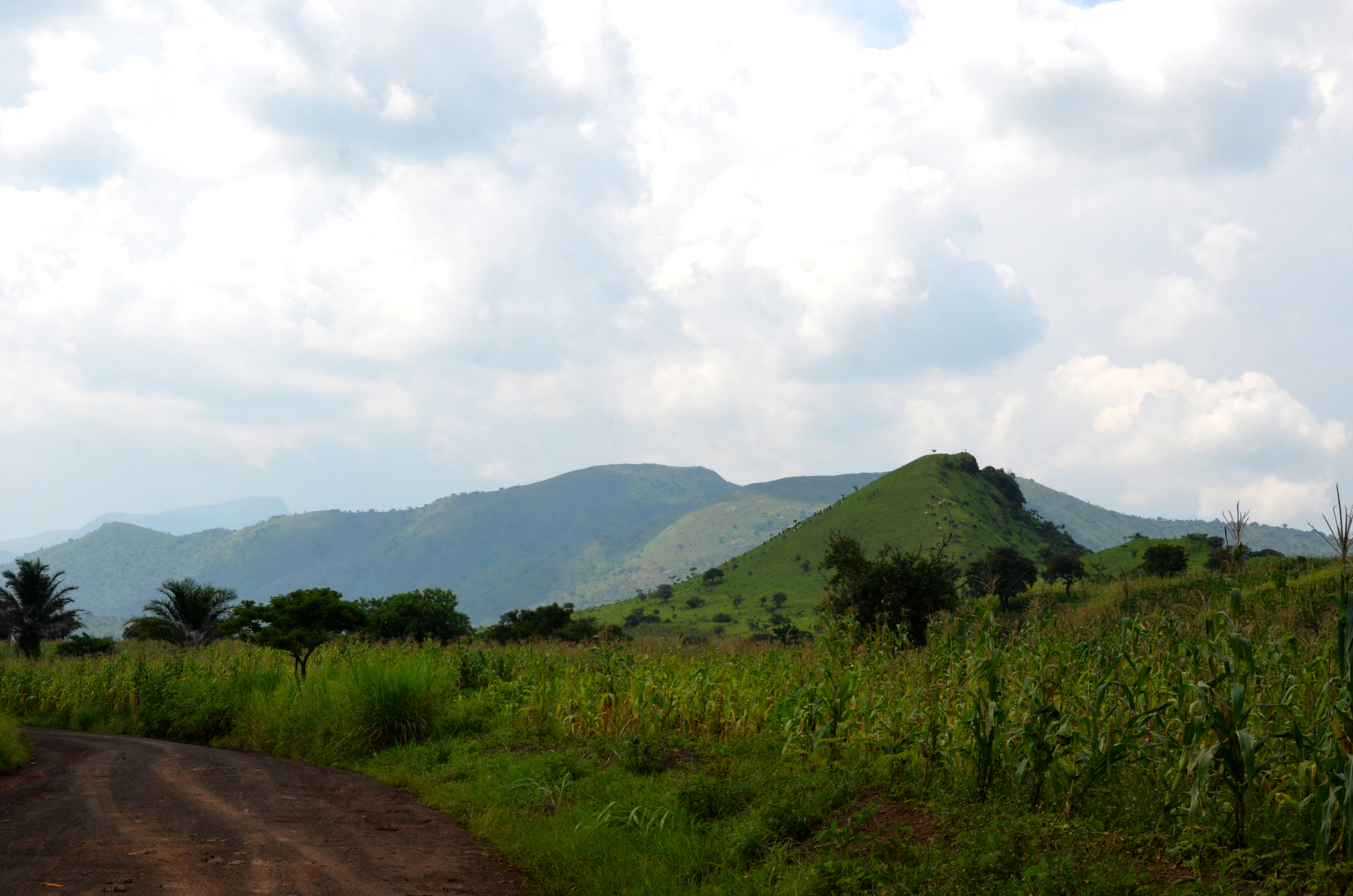
View of Koutaba Mountain

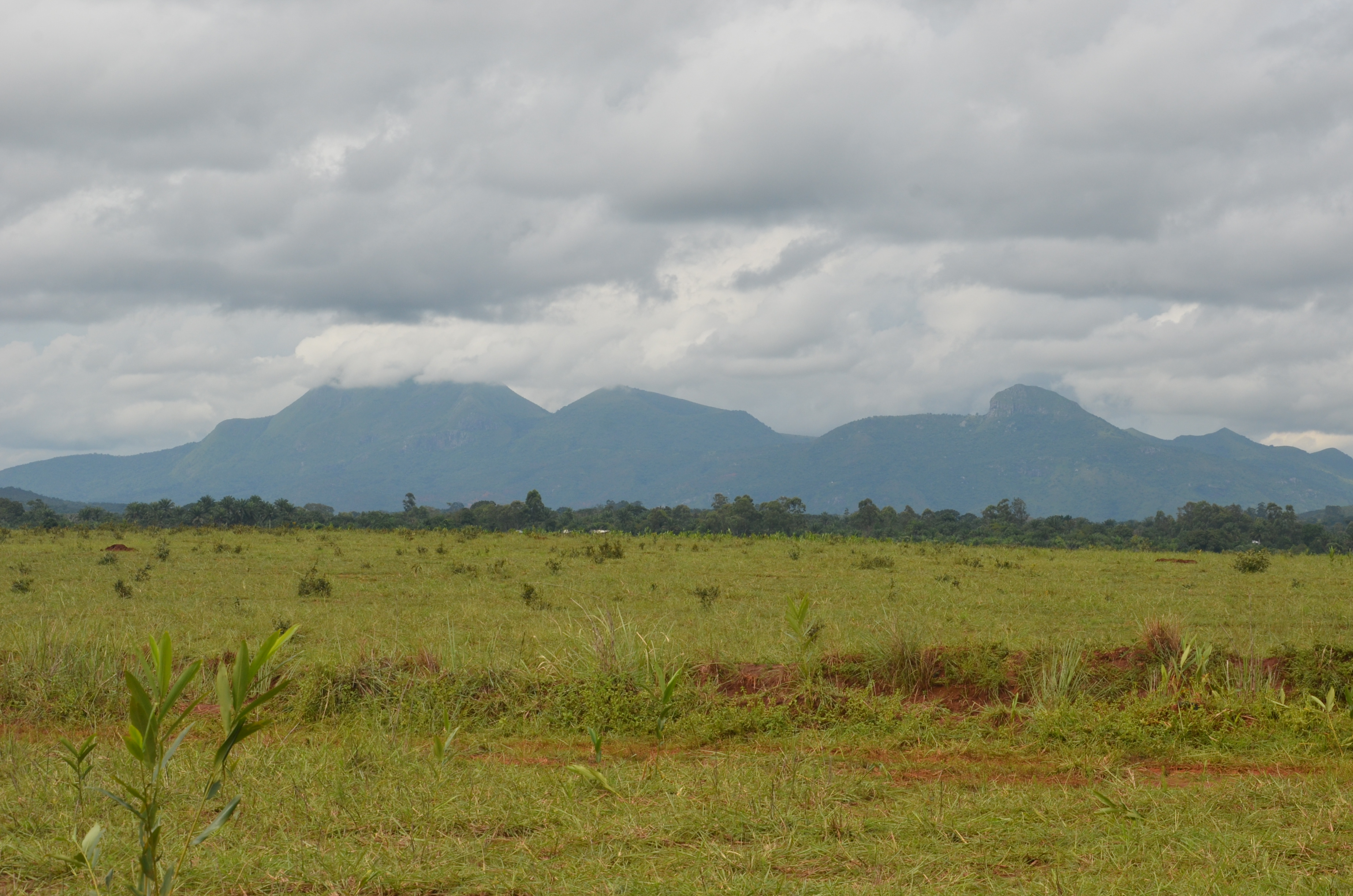
View of Koutaba Mountain

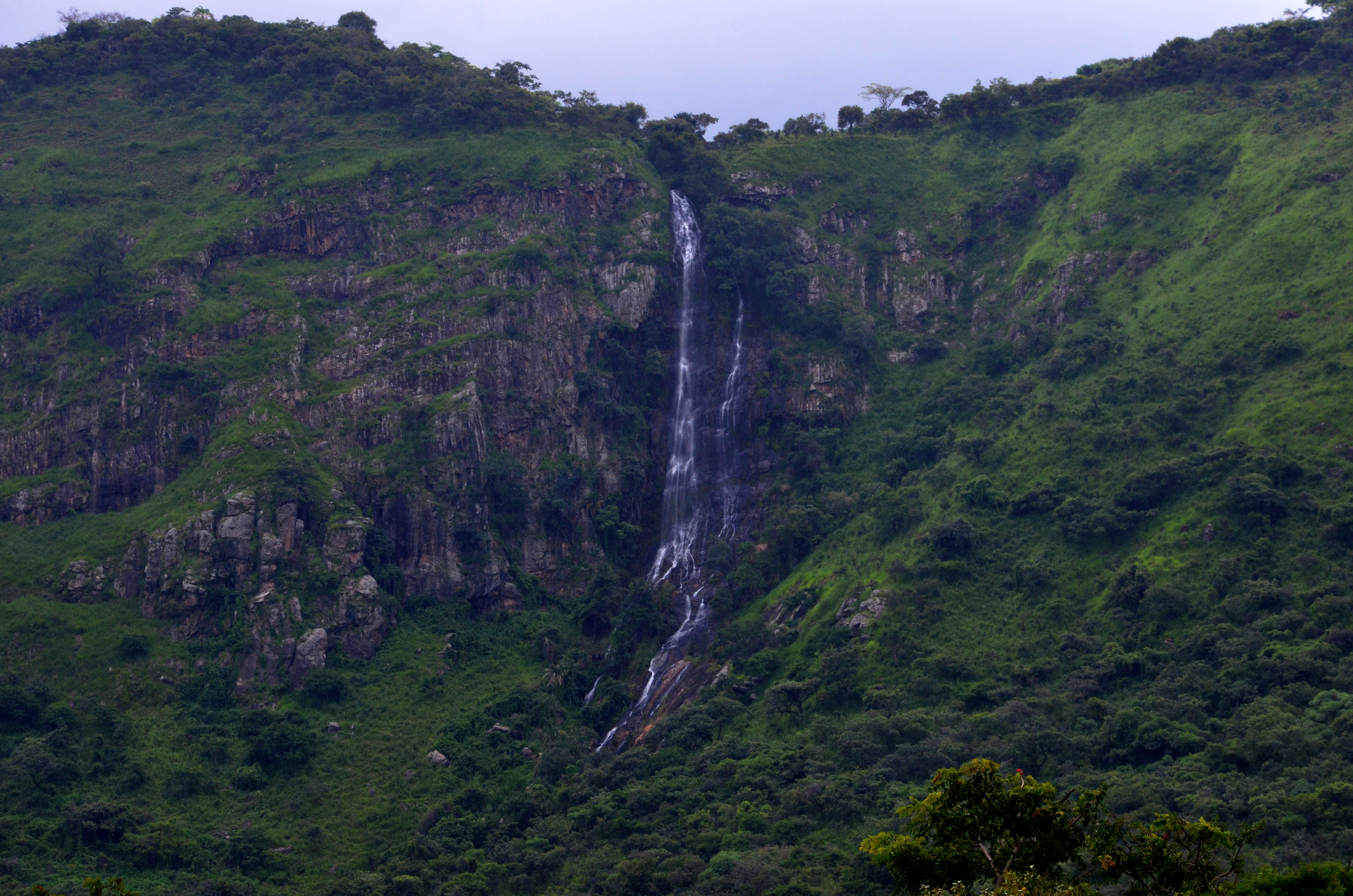
Waterfall on Koutaba Mountain

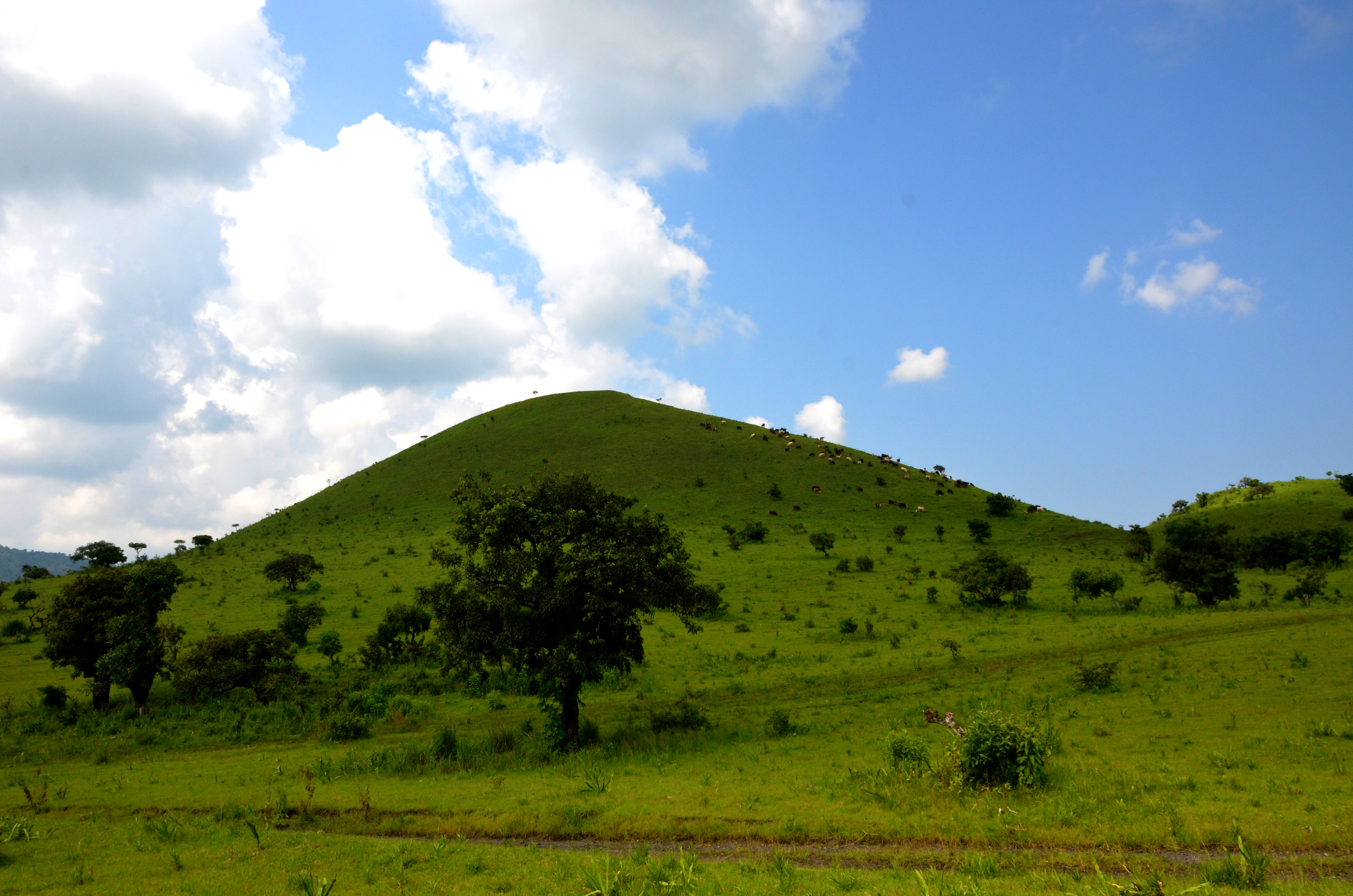
Koutaba Mountain scenery

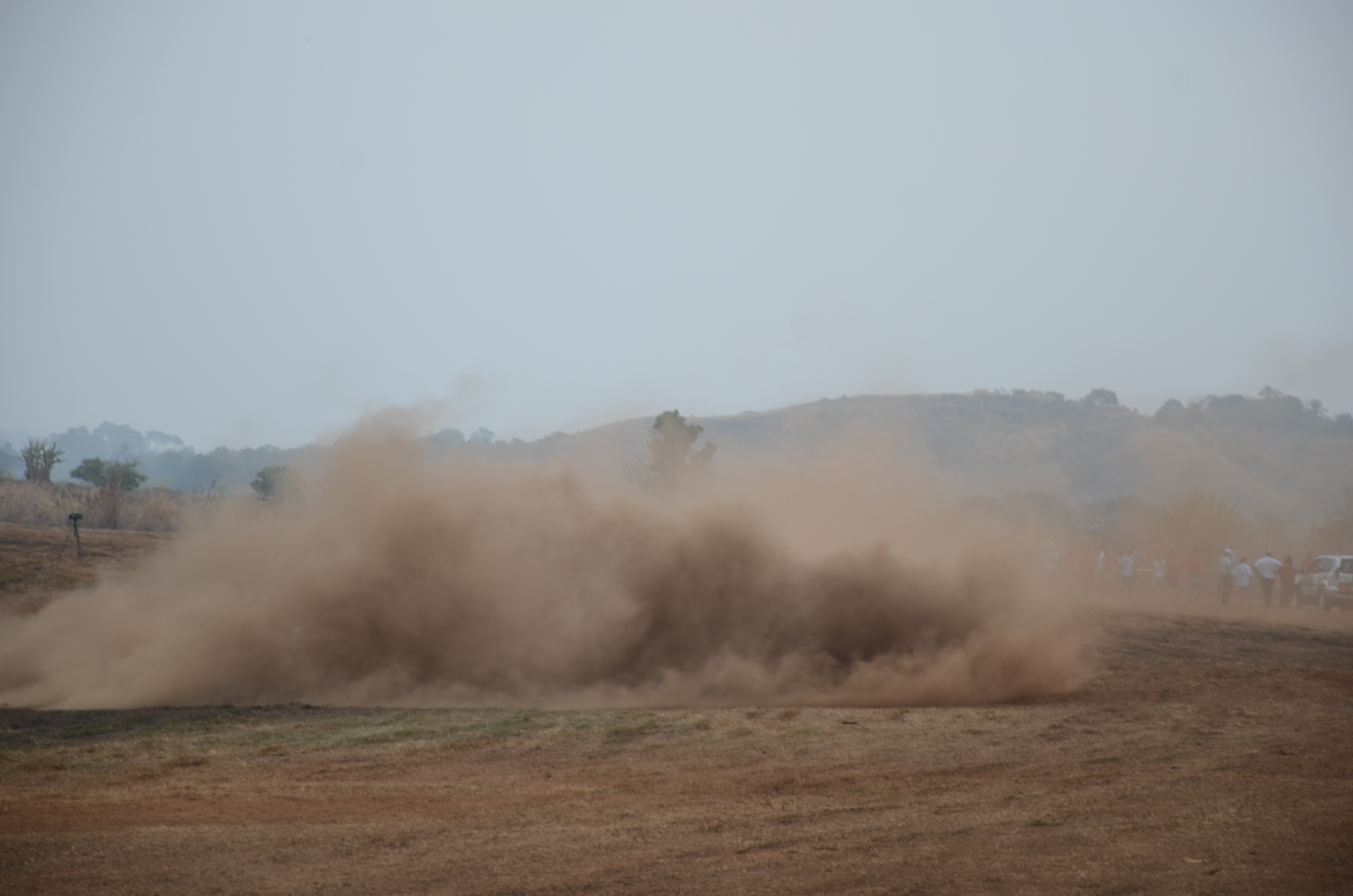
Dust storm in Koutaba

== See also ==
- Communes of Cameroon
