= List of hub airports =

Listed here are the world's main airports used as major airline hubs:

== Africa ==
=== Algeria ===
- Algiers
  - Air Algérie
  - Aigle Azur
  - Tassili Airlines
- Hassi Messaoud
  - Tassili Airlines
  - Air Express Algeria
  - Star Aviation
- Oran
  - Aigle Azur
  - Air Algérie

=== Angola ===
- Luanda
  - Fly Angola
  - TAAG Angola Airlines
  - Diexim Expresso
  - SonAir

=== Benin ===
- Cotonou
  - Benin Golf Air
  - Westair Benin

=== Botswana ===
- Gaborone
  - Air Botswana

=== Burkina Faso ===
- Ouagadougou
  - Air Burkina

=== Burundi ===
- Bujumbura
  - Air Burundi

=== Cameroon ===
- Douala
  - Camair-Co
- Yaoundé
  - Elysian Airlines
  - Section Liaison Air Yaoundé
  - National Airways Cameroon

=== Cape Verde ===
- Espargos
  - Cabo Verde Express
  - Halcyonair
  - Cabo Verde Airlines
- Praia
  - Cabo Verde Airlines
- São Pedro
  - Cabo Verde Airlines

=== Chad ===
- N'Djamena
  - Toumaï Air Tchad

=== Comoros ===
- Moroni
  - Comores Aviation International

=== Republic of the Congo ===
- Brazzaville
  - Equatorial Congo Airlines

=== Côte d'Ivoire (Ivory Coast) ===
- Abidjan
  - Air Côte d'Ivoire

=== Djibouti ===
- Djibouti
  - Daallo Airlines

=== Egypt ===
- Alexandria
  - Egyptair (focus city)
  - Air Arabia Egypt
  - AlMasria Universal Airlines
- Cairo
  - Air Cairo
  - AlMasria Universal Airlines
  - AMC Airlines
  - Egyptair
  - Egyptair Express
  - Nile Air
  - Nesma Airlines
  - Midwest Airlines
  - Alexandria Airlines
- Hurghada
  - Air Cairo
- Sharm el-Sheikh
  - Air Cairo
  - Egyptair Express

=== Eritrea ===
- Asmara
  - Eritrean Airlines

=== Ethiopia ===
- Addis Ababa
  - Ethiopian Airlines

=== Gabon ===
- Libreville
  - La Nationale
  - Sky Gabon

=== The Gambia ===
- Banjul
  - Gambia Bird

=== Ghana ===
- Accra
  - Africa World Airlines
  - Starbow Airlines
  - Antrak Air

=== Guinea ===
- Conakry
  - Elysian Airlines

=== Kenya ===
- Nairobi-Jomo Kenyatta
  - Fly540
  - Kenya Airways
- Wilson Airport
  - Airkenya Express
  - Safarilink Aviation

=== Libya ===
- Tripoli
  - Afriqiyah Airways
  - Libyan Airlines
  - Buraq Air
- Benghazi
  - Libyan Airlines
  - Berniq Airways
  - Buraq Air

=== Madagascar ===
- Antananarivo
  - Madagascar Airlines

=== Mauritania ===
- Nouakchott
  - Mauritania Airlines

=== Mauritius ===
- Port Louis
  - Air Mauritius

=== Morocco ===
- Casablanca
  - TUI fly Belgium
  - Royal Air Maroc
  - Royal Air Maroc Express
  - Air Arabia
- Marrakech
  - Atlas Blue
- Tangier
  - Royal Air Maroc Express

=== Mozambique ===
- Maputo
  - Kaya Airlines
  - LAM Mozambique Airlines
  - Moçambique Expresso

=== Nigeria ===
- Lagos
  - Aero Contractors
  - Med-View Airline
  - Chanchangi Airlines
  - Arik Air
- Abuja
  - IRS Airlines
  - Arik Air
  - Overland Airways

=== Rwanda ===
- Kigali
  - RwandAir

=== Senegal ===
- Dakar
  - Senegal Airlines

=== Seychelles ===
- Mahe Island
  - Air Seychelles

=== Sierra Leone ===
- Freetown
  - Fly 6ix

=== South Africa ===
- Johannesburg-OR Tambo
  - South African Airways
  - Airlink
  - South African Express
  - Mango
- Johannesburg-Lanseria
  - Solenta Aviation
- Cape Town
  - South African Express
  - Mango
- Durban
  - South African Express
  - FlySafair

=== South Sudan ===
- Juba
  - Feeder Airlines
  - Southern Star Airlines

=== Sudan ===
- Khartoum
  - Sudan Airways
  - Marsland Aviation

=== Tanzania ===
- Dar es Salaam (DAR)
  - Air Tanzania
  - Precision Air
  - Coastal Aviation
- Kilimanjaro
  - Precision Air
- Mwanza (MWZ)
  - Air Tanzania
- Zanzibar (ZNZ)
  - ZanAir

=== Togo ===
- Lomé
  - ASKY Airlines

=== Tunisia ===
- Tunis
  - Tunisair
  - Tunisair Express
  - Syphax Airlines
- Sfax
  - Syphax Airlines

=== Uganda ===
- Kampala
  - Air Uganda
  - Eagle Air
  - Royal Daisy Airlines
  - Uganda Airlines

=== Zimbabwe ===
- Harare
  - Air Zimbabwe

=== Zambia ===
- Lusaka
  - Proflight Zambia
  - Zambezi Airlines

== Central Asia ==
=== Afghanistan ===
- Kabul
  - Ariana Afghan Airlines
  - Kam Air
- Kandahar
  - Ariana Afghan Airlines

=== Kazakhstan ===
- Aktau
  - SCAT
- Almaty
  - Air Astana
  - SCAT
- Astana
  - Air Astana

=== Kyrgyzstan ===
- Bishkek
  - Kyrgyzstan

=== Tajikistan ===
- Dushanbe
  - Somon Air
  - Tajik Air

=== Turkmenistan ===
- Ashgabat
  - Turkmenistan Airlines

=== Uzbekistan ===
- Tashkent
  - Uzbekistan Airways

== East Asia ==
=== China (Mainland) ===
- Beijing-Capital (PEK)
  - Air China
  - Hainan Airlines
- Beijing-Daxing (PKX)
  - Air China
  - China Eastern Airlines
  - China Southern Airlines
  - China United Airlines
  - XiamenAir
- Chengdu (CTU)
  - Air China
  - Chengdu Airlines
  - Sichuan Airlines
- Chongqing (CKG)
  - Chongqing Airlines
  - China Southern Airlines
  - Sichuan Airlines
- Fuzhou (FOC)
  - Xiamen Airlines
- Guangzhou (CAN)
  - 9 Air
  - China Southern Airlines
  - FedEx
- Shanghai-Hongqiao (SHA)
  - China Eastern Airlines
  - Shanghai Airlines
- Shanghai-Pudong (PVG)
  - Air China
  - China Southern Airlines
  - China Eastern Airlines
  - Juneyao Airlines
  - Shanghai Airlines
  - Spring Airlines
- Shenzhen (SZX)
  - Shenzhen Airlines
  - SF Airlines
- Wuhan (WUH)
  - China Southern Airlines
- Xi'an (XIY)
  - China Eastern Airlines
  - Hainan Airlines
  - Shenzhen Airlines
- Zhengzhou (CGO)
  - Cargolux

=== Hong Kong ===
- Hong Kong (HKG)
  - Cathay Pacific
  - Air Hong Kong
  - DHL Aviation
  - Greater Bay Airlines
  - HK Express
  - Hong Kong Airlines
  - Kalitta Air
  - Polar Air Cargo
  - UPS Airlines

=== Japan ===
- Tokyo-Haneda (HND)
  - Air Do
  - All Nippon Airways
  - Japan Airlines
  - Skymark Airlines
  - Solaseed Air
  - StarFlyer
- Osaka-Kansai (KIX)
  - All Nippon Airways
  - FedEx Express
  - Japan Airlines
  - Nippon Cargo Airlines
  - Peach
- Tokyo-Narita (NRT)
  - All Nippon Airways
  - Japan Airlines
  - Jetstar Japan
  - Nippon Cargo Airlines
  - Peach
  - Polar Air Cargo
  - Spring Airlines Japan
  - Zipair Tokyo
- Osaka-Itami (ITM)
  - All Nippon Airways
  - Japan Airlines

=== South Korea ===
- Seoul-Incheon (ICN)
  - Asiana Airlines
  - Eastar Jet
  - Jeju Air
  - Jin Air
  - Korean Air
  - T'way Airlines
  - Polar Air Cargo
- Busan (PUS)
  - Air Busan
  - Korean Air
  - Asiana Airlines
- Seoul-Gimpo (GMP)
  - Asiana Airlines
  - Korean Air

=== Macau ===
- Macau (MFM)
  - Air Macau

=== Mongolia ===
- Ulaanbaatar (ULN)
  - MIAT Mongolian Airlines

=== Taiwan ===
- Taipei-Taoyuan (TPE)
  - China Airlines
  - EVA Air
  - Tigerair Taiwan
  - UNI Air
- Taipei-Songshan
  - Far Eastern Air
  - China Airlines
  - EVA Air
  - Mandarin Airlines
  - UNI Air
- Kaohsiung City (KHH)
  - UNI Air
- Taichung City (RMQ)
  - Mandarin Airlines

== South Asia ==
=== Bangladesh ===
- Dhaka (DAC)
  - Biman Bangladesh Airlines
  - US-Bangla Airlines
  - NovoAir
- Chittagong (CGP)
  - Biman Bangladesh Airlines
  - US-Bangla Airlines
  - NovoAir
- Sylhet (ZYL)
  - Biman Bangladesh Airlines
  - US-Bangla Airlines

=== India ===
- Delhi
  - AirAsia India
  - Air India
  - Vistara
  - IndiGo
  - Deccan 360
  - SpiceJet
  - GoAir
- Mumbai
  - AirAsia India
  - Air India
  - Vistara
  - Deccan 360
  - GoAir
  - IndiGo
- Bengaluru
  - Blue Dart Aviation
  - IndiGo
  - Deccan Aviation
  - Alliance Air
- Kolkata
  - Air Deccan
  - Air India
  - Alliance Air
  - Air Asia India
  - Blue Dart Aviation
  - GoAir
  - IndiGo
- Chennai
  - Blue Dart Aviation
  - IndiGo
  - Alliance Air
- Hyderabad
  - SpiceJet
  - Lufthansa Cargo
  - IndiGo

=== Maldives ===
- Malé
  - Maldivian

=== Nepal ===
- Kathmandu
  - Nepal Airlines
  - BB Airways
  - Buddha Air
  - Yeti Airlines
  - Gorkha Airlines
  - Sita Air
  - Tara Air
- Pokhara
  - Gorkha Airlines
  - Sita Air
- Nepalgunj
  - Tara Air

=== Pakistan ===
- Karachi
  - PIA (Pakistan International)
  - Aero Asia
  - Airblue
- Lahore
  - PIA (Pakistan International)
- Islamabad
  - PIA (Pakistan International)

=== Sri Lanka ===
- Colombo
  - Cinnamon Air
  - FitsAir
  - SriLankan Airlines
  - SriLankan Cargo
- Hambantota
  - Helitours
  - SriLankan Airlines
  - SriLankan Cargo

== Southeast Asia ==
=== Brunei ===
- Brunei International Airport (BWN)
  - Royal Brunei Airlines

=== Cambodia ===
- Techo International Airport
  - Air Cambodia
  - AirAsia Cambodia
  - Cambodia Airways
  - Sky Angkor Airlines

=== Indonesia ===
- Jakarta-Soekarno-Hatta
  - Batik Air
  - Citilink
  - Garuda Indonesia
  - Indonesia AirAsia
  - Lion Air
  - NAM Air
  - Sriwijaya Air
- Surabaya
  - Citilink
  - Garuda Indonesia
  - Lion Air
  - Sriwijaya Air
- Denpasar, Bali
  - Garuda Indonesia
  - Indonesia AirAsia
  - Lion Air
  - Wings Air
- Makassar
  - Garuda Indonesia
  - Lion Air
  - Sriwijaya Air
  - Wings Air
- Jakarta-Halim Perdanakusuma
  - Batik Air
  - Citilink
- Medan
  - Garuda Indonesia
  - Indonesia AirAsia
  - Lion Air
  - Wings Air
- Bandung
  - Indonesia AirAsia
  - Lion Air
  - Wings Air
- Mataram
  - Indonesia AirAsia

=== Malaysia ===
- Senai
  - AirAsia
- Kota Kinabalu
  - AirAsia
  - Malaysia Airlines
  - MASwings
- Kuching
  - AirAsia
  - Malaysia Airlines
  - MASwings
- Kuala Lumpur-International (KUL)
  - AirAsia
  - AirAsia X
  - Malaysia Airlines
  - Batik Air Malaysia
- Miri
  - MASwings
- Penang (PEN)
  - AirAsia
  - Firefly
- Kuala Lumpur-Subang (SZB)
  - Firefly
  - Batik Air Malaysia

=== Philippines ===
- Luzon
  - Clark
    - Cebu Pacific
    - Philippine Airlines
    - Philippines AirAsia
  - Manila
    - Cebgo
    - Cebu Pacific
    - Philippine Airlines
    - Philippines AirAsia
    - PAL Express
- Visayas
  - Cebu
    - Cebu Pacific
    - Philippine Airlines
    - Philippines AirAsia
  - Iloilo
    - Cebu Pacific
- Mindanao
  - Davao
    - Cebu Pacific
    - PAL Express
    - Philippine Airlines
  - Zamboanga
    - PAL Express

=== Singapore ===
- Singapore (SIN)
  - Jetstar Asia
  - Singapore Airlines
  - Scoot

=== Thailand ===
- Bangkok-Suvarnabhumi (BKK)
  - Thai Airways International
  - Thai Smile
  - Bangkok Airways
  - Thai Vietjet Air
  - Thai AirAsia
- Bangkok-Don Mueang (DMK)
  - Nok Air
  - Thai AirAsia
  - Thai AirAsia X
  - Thai Lion Air
- Chiang Mai (CNX)
  - Thai Airways International
  - Kan Air
  - Thai Smile
- Phuket (HKT)
  - Thai Airways International
  - Thai AirAsia
  - Thai Smile
- Ko Samui (USM)
  - Bangkok Airways

=== Vietnam ===
- Hanoi (HAN)
  - VietJet Air
  - Vietnam Airlines
- Saigon - Ho Chi Minh City (SGN)
  - Pacific Airlines
  - VietJet Air
  - Vietnam Airlines
  - VASCO

== Middle East ==
=== Azerbaijan ===
- Baku
  - Azerbaijan Airlines

=== Bahrain ===
- Manama (BAH)
  - Gulf Air

=== Iran ===
- Tehran-Imam Khomeini
  - Iran Air
  - Mahan Air
  - Kish Air
  - Caspian Airlines
- Tehran-Mehrabad
  - Iran Air
  - Iran Asseman Airlines
  - Mahan Air
  - Caspian Airlines
  - Saha Airlines
  - Taban Airlines
  - Aria Air
- Mashhad
  - Iran Air Tours
- Shiraz
  - Iran Air
  - Iran Asseman Airlines
- Kish Island
  - Kish Air

=== Israel ===
- Haifa
  - airHaifa
- Tel Aviv
  - Arkia Israel Airlines
  - El Al
  - Israir Airlines

=== Jordan ===
- Amman
  - Royal Jordanian

=== Lebanon ===
- Beirut
  - Middle East Airlines

=== Oman ===
- Muscat
  - Oman Air

=== Qatar ===
- Doha
  - Qatar Airways

=== Saudi Arabia ===
- Riyadh
  - Saudia
  - Riyadh Air
- Jeddah
  - Saudia
  - Flynas
  - flyadeal
- Dammam
  - flyadeal

=== United Arab Emirates ===
- Abu Dhabi (AUH)
  - Etihad
- Dubai (DXB)
  - Emirates
  - Flydubai
- Sharjah (SHJ)
  - Air Arabia

== Europe ==
Country	Airport	Airlines
Austria	Vienna	Austrian Airlines
Belarus	Minsk	Belavia
Belgium	Brussels	Brussels Airlines
Belgium	Brussels	TUI fly Belgium
Bulgaria	Sofia	Bulgaria Air
Croatia	Zagreb	Croatia Airlines
Czech Republic	Prague	
Czech Republic	Prague	Smartwings
Denmark	Copenhagen	Scandinavian Airlines
Denmark	Copenhagen	Norwegian Air Shuttle
Finland	Helsinki	Finnair
Finland	Helsinki	Nordic Regional Airlines
Finland	Helsinki	Norwegian Air Shuttle
Finland	Helsinki	TUIfly Nordic
France	Paris-Charles de Gaulle	Air France
France	Lyon	Air France
France	Toulouse–Blagnac	Volotea
Georgia	Tbilisi	Georgian Airways
Germany	Berlin Brandenburg	EasyJet
Germany	Berlin Brandenburg	Eurowings
Germany	Cologne/Bonn	Eurowings
Germany	Düsseldorf	Eurowings
Germany	Frankfurt	Lufthansa
Germany	Frankfurt	Condor Airlines
Germany	Munich	Lufthansa
Germany	Stuttgart	Eurowings
Greece	Athens	Aegean Airlines
Greece	Athens	Air Mediterranean
Hungary	Budapest	Wizz Air
Iceland	Reykjavik-Keflavik	Icelandair
Ireland	Dublin	Aer Lingus
Italy	Milan-Malpensa	EasyJet
Italy	Rome-Fiumicino	ITA Airways
Italy	Rome-Fiumicino	Vueling
Latvia	Riga	airBaltic
Luxembourg	Luxembourg	Luxair
Luxembourg	Luxembourg	Cargolux
Netherlands	Amsterdam	KLM
Netherlands	Amsterdam	Transavia
Netherlands	Amsterdam	TUI fly Netherlands
Norway	Oslo	Scandinavian Airlines
Norway	Oslo	Norwegian Air Shuttle
Norway	Bodø	Widerøe
Poland	Warsaw-Chopin	Enter Air
Poland	Warsaw-Chopin	LOT Polish Airlines
Poland	Warsaw-Chopin	SprintAir
Poland	Warsaw-Chopin	Wizz Air
Poland	Wrocław	Enter Air
Poland	Wrocław	Wizz Air
Poland	Gdańsk	Wizz Air
Poland	Katowice	Wizz Air
Portugal	Lisbon	TAP Air Portugal
Portugal	Lisbon	TAP Express
Portugal	Lisbon	EuroAtlantic Airways
Portugal	Lisbon	White Airways
Portugal	Lisbon	EasyJet
Portugal	Porto	TAP Air Portugal
Portugal	Porto	TAP Express
Portugal	Ponta Delgada	SATA International
Romania	Bucharest-Henri Coandă	TAROM
Romania	Bucharest-Henri Coandă	Wizz Air
Romania	Timișoara	Carpatair
Russia	Moscow-Domodedovo	Globus Airlines
Russia	Moscow-Domodedovo	NordStar
Russia	Moscow-Domodedovo	RusLine
Russia	Moscow-Domodedovo	S7 Airlines
Russia	Moscow-Domodedovo	Ural Airlines
Russia	Moscow-Domodedovo	Yamal Airlines
Russia	Yekaterinburg	Ural Airlines
Russia	Saint Petersburg	Rossiya
Russia	Novosibirsk	Globus Airlines
Russia	Novosibirsk	S7 Airlines
Russia	Moscow-Sheremetyevo	Aeroflot
Russia	Moscow-Sheremetyevo	Nordwind Airlines
Russia	Moscow-Vnukovo	Utair
Russia	Krasnoyarsk	NordStar Airlines
Serbia	Belgrade Nikola Tesla Airport	Air Serbia
Serbia	Belgrade Nikola Tesla Airport	Wizz Air
Slovenia	Ljubljana	Solinair
Slovenia	Portorož	Solinair
Spain	Madrid	Iberia
Spain	Madrid	Air Europa
Spain	Madrid	EasyJet
Spain	Madrid	Iberia Express
Spain	Madrid	Air Nostrum
Spain	Barcelona	Iberia
Spain	Barcelona	Vueling
Spain	Barcelona	LEVEL
Spain	Barcelona	Air Nostrum
Spain	Palma de Mallorca	Air Europa
Spain	Valencia	Air Nostrum
Sweden	Stockholm-Arlanda	Scandinavian Airlines
Sweden	Stockholm-Arlanda	Norwegian Air Shuttle
Switzerland	Zurich	Swiss International Air Lines
Switzerland	Zurich	Edelweiss Air
Switzerland	Basel-Mulhouse-Freiburg	EasyJet
Switzerland	Geneva	Swiss International Air Lines
Switzerland	Geneva	EasyJet
Turkey	Istanbul	Turkish Airlines
Turkey	Ankara	AnadoluJet
Turkey	Istanbul Sabiha Gökçen	Pegasus Airlines
Turkey	Istanbul Sabiha Gökçen	SunExpress
Turkey	İzmir	Pegasus Airlines
Turkey	Antalya	Turkish Airlines
Turkey	Antalya	SunExpress
Ukraine	Boryspil-Kyiv	Ukraine International Airlines
Ukraine	Boryspil-Kyiv	Wind Rose Aviation
United Kingdom	Glasgow	Loganair
United Kingdom	Leeds Bradford	Jet2.com
United Kingdom	London Heathrow	British Airways
United Kingdom	London Heathrow	Virgin Atlantic
United Kingdom	London Gatwick	British Airways
United Kingdom	Luton	EasyJet
United Kingdom	Manchester	Virgin Atlantic

== North America ==
=== Canada ===
==== Alberta ====
- Calgary (YYC)
  - Air Canada
  - WestJet
- Edmonton (YEG)
  - Canadian North
  - Flair Airlines

==== British Columbia ====
- Vancouver (YVR)
  - Air Canada
  - WestJet

==== Northwest Territories ====
- Yellowknife (YZF)
  - Canadian North

==== Nova Scotia ====
- Halifax (YHZ)
  - Jazz
  - Porter Airlines

==== Ontario ====
- North Bay (YYB)
  - Voyageur Airways
- Ottawa (YOW)
  - Air Canada
  - Porter Airlines
- Toronto–Pearson (YYZ)
  - Air Canada
  - WestJet
  - Porter Airlines
- Toronto–Billy Bishop (Toronto City Centre Airport, Toronto Island Airport) (YTZ)
  - Porter Airlines

==== Québec ====
- Montreal (YUL)
  - Air Canada
  - Air Transat
  - Jazz Aviation
  - Porter Airlines

=== Mexico ===
==== Baja California ====
- Mexicali (MXL)
  - Volaris (focus city)
- Tijuana (TIJ)
  - Volaris
  - Viva (focus city)

==== Baja California Sur ====
- Cabo San Lucas (CSL)
  - Calafia Airlines
- San José del Cabo (SJD)
  - Viva (focus city)

==== Coahuila ====
- Saltillo (SLW)
  - Aeronaves TSM

==== Guanajuato ====
- León-El Bajío (BJX)
  - Volaris (focus city)

==== Jalisco ====
- Guadalajara (GDL)
  - Aeroméxico
  - Viva
  - Volaris (primary hub)

==== Mexico City ====
- Mexico City-Benito Juarez (MEX)
  - Aeroméxico (primary hub)
  - Aeroméxico Connect (primary hub)
  - Magnicharters
  - Viva
  - Volaris

==== Mexico State ====
- Mexico City-Felipe Ángeles (NLU)
  - Aeroméxico (focus city)
  - AeroUnion
  - Mas Air
  - Mexicana (primary hub)
  - Viva (focus city)

==== Nuevo León ====
- Monterrey (MTY)
  - Aeroméxico
  - Aerus (primary hub)
  - Magnicharters (primary hub)
  - TAR Aerolíneas (focus city)
  - Viva (primary hub)

==== Oaxaca ====
- Oaxaca (OAX)
  - Aerotucán

==== Querétaro ====
- Querétaro (QRO)
  - TAR Aerolíneas (primary hub)

==== Quintana Roo ====
- Cancún (CUN)
  - Magnicharters (focus city)
  - Viva
  - Volaris (focus city)

==== San Luis Potosí ====
- San Luis Potosí (SLP)
  - Estafeta

==== Sinaloa ====
- Culiacán (CUL)
  - Volaris (focus city)

==== Sonora ====
- Hermosillo (HMO)
  - TAR Aerolíneas (focus city)

==== Yucatán ====
- Mérida (MID)
  - Viva (focus city)

=== United States ===
State	Airport	Airline
Alaska	Anchorage (ANC)	Alaska Airlines
Alaska	Anchorage (ANC)	Atlas Air
Alaska	Anchorage (ANC)	FedEx Express
Alaska	Anchorage (ANC)	Polar Air Cargo
Alaska	Anchorage (ANC)	UPS Airlines
Arizona	Phoenix-Sky Harbor (PHX)	American Airlines
Arizona	Phoenix-Sky Harbor (PHX)	Frontier Airlines (focus city)
Arizona	Phoenix-Sky Harbor (PHX)	Southwest Airlines (focus city)
Arizona	Phoenix-Mesa (AZA)	Allegiant Air (focus city)
California	Hollywood Burbank Airport (BUR)	Avelo Airlines (focus city)
California	Los Angeles (LAX)	Allegiant Air (focus city)
California	Los Angeles (LAX)	Alaska Airlines
California	Los Angeles (LAX)	American Airlines
California	Los Angeles (LAX)	Delta Air Lines
California	Los Angeles (LAX)	JetBlue Airways (focus city)
California	Los Angeles (LAX)	Southwest Airlines (focus city)
California	Los Angeles (LAX)	United Airlines
California	Oakland (OAK)	Southwest Airlines (focus city)
California	San Diego (SAN)	Alaska Airlines
California	San Francisco (SFO)	Alaska Airlines
California	San Francisco (SFO)	United Airlines
California	San Jose (SJC)	Alaska Airlines (focus city)
California	Santa Rosa (STS)	Avelo Airlines (focus city)
Colorado	Denver (DEN)	Frontier Airlines
Colorado	Denver (DEN)	Southwest Airlines (focus city)
Colorado	Denver (DEN)	United Airlines
Connecticut	Hartford (BDL)	Breeze Airways (focus city)
Connecticut	Hartford (BDL)	Avelo Airlines (focus city)
Connecticut	New Haven (HVN)	Avelo Airlines (focus city)
Delaware	Wilmington Airport (DE) (ILG)	Avelo Airlines (focus city)
Florida	Miami (MIA)	American Airlines
Florida	Miami (MIA)	Frontier Airlines (focus city)
Florida	Fort Lauderdale (FLL)	JetBlue Airways (focus city)
Florida	Fort Lauderdale (FLL)	Silver Airways
Florida	Fort Lauderdale (FLL)	Allegiant Air (focus city)
Florida	Orlando (MCO)	Southwest Airlines (focus city)
Florida	Orlando (MCO)	Frontier Airlines (focus city)
Florida	Orlando (MCO)	JetBlue Airways (focus city)
Florida	Orlando (MCO)	Avelo Airlines (focus city)
Florida	Tampa (TPA)	Silver Airways
Florida	Tampa (TPA)	Frontier Airlines (focus city)
Florida	Tampa (TPA)	Breeze Airways (focus city)
Florida	Orlando-Sanford (SFB)	Allegiant Air (focus city)
Florida	Destin-Fort Walton Beach (VPS)	Allegiant Air (focus city)
Florida	Punta Gorda (PGD)	Allegiant Air (focus city)
Florida	St. Petersburg (FL) (PIE)	Allegiant Air (focus city)
Florida	Lakeland	Avelo Airlines (focus city)
Florida	Sarasota (SRQ)	Allegiant Air (focus city)
Georgia	Atlanta (ATL)	Delta Air Lines
Georgia	Atlanta (ATL)	Frontier Airlines (focus city)
Georgia	Atlanta (ATL)	Southwest Airlines (focus city)
Hawaii	Honolulu (HNL)	Hawaiian Airlines
Hawaii	Kahului (OGG)	Hawaiian Airlines
Idaho	Boise (BOI)	Alaska Airlines (focus city)
Illinois	Chicago-Midway (MDW)	Southwest Airlines (focus city)
Illinois	Chicago-Midway (MDW)	Frontier Airlines (focus city)
Illinois	Chicago-O'Hare (ORD)	American Airlines
Illinois	Chicago-O'Hare (ORD)	United Airlines
Indiana	Indianapolis (IND)	Allegiant Air (focus city)
Indiana	Indianapolis (IND)	FedEx Express
Indiana	Indianapolis (IND)	Mountain Air Cargo
Indiana	Indianapolis (IND)	Republic Airways (base)
Iowa	Des Moines (DSM)	Allegiant Air (focus city)
Kentucky	Cincinnati (CVG)	Allegiant Air (focus city)
Kentucky	Cincinnati (CVG)	Amazon Air
Kentucky	Cincinnati (CVG)	DHL Aviation
Kentucky	Louisville (SDF)	United Parcel Service (UPS)
Louisiana	New Orleans (MSY)	Breeze Airways (focus city)
Maryland	Baltimore (BWI)	Southwest Airlines (focus city)
Massachusetts	Boston (BOS)	Delta Air Lines
Massachusetts	Boston (BOS)	JetBlue Airways (focus city)
Massachusetts	Boston (BOS)	Cape Air
Michigan	Detroit (DTW)	Delta Air Lines
Michigan	Flint (FNT)	Allegiant Air (focus city)
Michigan	Grand Rapids (GRR)	Allegiant Air (focus city)
Minnesota	Minneapolis (MSP)	Delta Air Lines
Minnesota	Minneapolis (MSP)	Sun Country Airlines
Montana	Billings (BIL)	Alpine Air Cargo
Montana	Billings (BIL)	Corporate Air
Montana	Billings (BIL)	Mountain Air Cargo
Montana	Billings (BIL)	Cape Air (operating base)
Montana	Great Falls (GTF)	Corporate Air
Montana	Great Falls (GTF)	FedEx Express
Nevada	Las Vegas (LAS)	Allegiant Air (focus city)
Nevada	Las Vegas (LAS)	Frontier Airlines (focus city)
Nevada	Las Vegas (LAS)	JSX (focus city)
Nevada	Las Vegas (LAS)	Southwest Airlines (focus city)
Nevada	Las Vegas (LAS)	Sun Country Airlines (focus city)
New Jersey	Newark (EWR)	United Airlines
New Jersey	Trenton (TTN)	Frontier Airlines (focus city)
New York	New York-JFK (JFK)	American Airlines
New York	New York-JFK (JFK)	Delta Air Lines
New York	New York-JFK (JFK)	JetBlue Airways (focus city)
New York	New York-JFK (JFK)	Eastern Airlines, LLC (focus city)
New York	New York-LaGuardia (LGA)	American Airlines
New York	New York-LaGuardia (LGA)	Delta Air Lines
North Carolina	Raleigh-Durham (RDU)	Delta Air Lines (focus city)
North Carolina	Raleigh-Durham (RDU)	Breeze Airways (focus city)
North Carolina	Charlotte (CLT)	American Airlines
North Carolina	Greensboro (GSO)	FedEx Express
North Carolina	Asheville (AVL)	Allegiant Air (focus city)
Ohio	Cleveland (CLE)	Frontier Airlines (focus city)
Oregon	Portland (PDX)	Alaska Airlines
Pennsylvania	Philadelphia (PHL)	American Airlines
Pennsylvania	Philadelphia (PHL)	Frontier Airlines (focus city)
Pennsylvania	Pittsburgh (PIT)	Southern Airways Express
Pennsylvania	Pittsburgh (PIT)	Allegiant Air (focus city)
Pennsylvania	Allentown (ABE)	Allegiant Air (focus city)
South Carolina	Charleston (CHS)	Breeze Airways (focus city)
South Carolina	Columbia (CAE)	United Parcel Service (UPS)
South Dakota	Sioux Falls (KFSD)	Alpine Air Express
South Dakota	Sioux Falls (KFSD)	Bemidji Airlines
Tennessee	Memphis (MEM)	FedEx Express
Tennessee	Memphis (MEM)	Southern Airways Express
Tennessee	Knoxville (TYS)	Allegiant Air (focus city)
Tennessee	Nashville (BNA)	Southwest Airlines (focus city)
Tennessee	Nashville (BNA)	Allegiant Air (focus city)
Texas	Dallas/Fort Worth (DFW)	American Airlines
Texas	Dallas/Fort Worth (DFW)	Sun Country Airlines (focus city)
Texas	Dallas-Love Field (DAL)	Southwest Airlines (focus city)
Texas	Houston-Intercontinental (IAH)	United Airlines
Texas	Houston-Hobby (HOU)	Southwest Airlines (focus city)
Texas	Austin (AUS)	Allegiant Air (focus city)
Utah	Salt Lake City (SLC)	Delta Air Lines
Utah	Salt Lake City (SLC)	Alpine air express
Utah	Salt Lake City (SLC)	Corporate air
Utah	Provo (PVU)	Allegiant Air (focus city)
Virginia	Norfolk (ORF)	Breeze Airways (focus city)
Virginia	Washington-Dulles (IAD)	United Airlines
Virginia	Washington-Reagan (DCA)	American Airlines
Washington	Seattle (SEA)	Alaska Airlines
Washington	Seattle (SEA)	Delta Air Lines
Washington	Bellingham (BLI)	Allegiant Air (focus city)
Wisconsin	Appleton (ATW)	Allegiant Air (focus city)

== Central America ==
=== Guatemala ===
- Guatemala City (GUA)
  - Transportes Aéreos Guatemaltecos

=== Honduras ===
- La Ceiba (LCE)
  - Islena Airlines
  - Aerolíneas Sosa
- Tegucigalpa (TGU)
  - Aerolíneas Sosa

=== El Salvador ===
- San Salvador (SAL)
  - Avianca El Salvador

=== Costa Rica ===
- San José (SJO)
  - Avianca Costa Rica
  - Copa Airlines (focus city)

=== Panama ===
- Panama City (PTY)
  - Copa Airlines

== Caribbean ==
=== The Bahamas ===
- Nassau (NAS)
  - Bahamasair

=== Barbados ===
- Bridgetown (BGI)
  - REDjet (defunct)

=== Cayman Islands ===
- George Town (GCM)
  - Cayman Airways

=== Cuba ===
- Havana (HAV)
  - Cubana

=== Dominican Republic ===
- Santo Domingo (SDQ)
  - Arajet

=== Guadeloupe ===
- Pointe-à-Pitre (PTP)
  - Air Caraïbes
  - Air Antilles Express
  - Air France (A320 regional hub)

=== Jamaica ===
- Kingston (KIN)
  - Caribbean Airlines

=== Martinique ===
- Fort-de-France (FDF)
  - Air Caraïbes

=== Puerto Rico ===
- Aguadilla (BQN)
  - Prinair
- San Juan (SJU)
  - Seaborne Airlines
  - JetBlue Airways
  - Frontier Airlines
- Vieques (VQS)
  - Vieques Air Link

=== St. Vincent and the Grenadines ===
- Kingstown (SVD)
  - SVG Air
- Mustique (MSQ)
  - Mustique Airways

=== Trinidad and Tobago ===
- Port of Spain (POS)
  - Caribbean Airlines

== Oceania ==
=== Australia ===
- Melbourne (MEL)
  - Qantas
  - Jetstar
  - Virgin Australia
- Sydney (SYD)
  - Jetstar
  - Qantas
  - Virgin Australia
- Brisbane (BNE)
  - Jetstar
  - Qantas
  - Virgin Australia
- Perth (PER)
  - Virgin Australia Regional Airlines
  - Qantas
- Adelaide (ADL)
  - Qantas
  - Rex Airlines
- Gold Coast (OOL)
  - Jetstar
  - Cebgo
- Darwin (DRW)
  - Airnorth
  - Jetstar
- Cairns (CNS)
  - Jetstar
  - Skytrans Airlines

=== Fiji ===
- Nadi (NAN)
  - Fiji Airways

=== Guam ===
- Hagatna (GUM)
  - United Airlines

=== New Zealand ===
- Auckland (AKL)
  - Air New Zealand
  - Jetstar
- Christchurch (CHC)
  - Air New Zealand
- Wellington (WLG)
  - Air New Zealand

== South America ==
=== Argentina ===
- Buenos Aires-Jorge Newbery (AEP)
  - Aerolíneas Argentinas
- Buenos Aires-Ministro Pistarini (EZE)
  - Aerolíneas Argentinas
- Córdoba (COR)
  - Aerolíneas Argentinas
- Salta (SLA)
  - Andes Líneas Aéreas

=== Colombia ===
- Bogota (BOG)
  - Avianca
  - Copa Airlines Colombia
  - EasyFly
  - LAN Colombia
  - Satena
  - Wingo
  - Viva Colombia
- Medellín (MDE)
  - Avianca
  - Viva Colombia

=== French Guiana ===
- Cayenne (CAY)
  - Air Guyane Express

=== Brazil ===
- São Paulo-Guarulhos (GRU)
  - TAM
  - Avianca Brasil
  - Gol Airlines
- São Paulo-Congonhas (CGH)
  - Gol Airlines
  - TAM
- Brasília (BSB)
  - Avianca Brasil
  - Gol Airlines
  - TAM
- Recife (REC)
  - Azul Brazilian Airlines
- Campinas (VCP)
  - Azul Brazilian Airlines
- Rio de Janeiro–Galeão
  - Gol Airlines
- Belo Horizonte (CNF)
  - Azul Brazilian Airlines
  - Gol Airlines
- Ribeirão Preto (RAO)
  - Passaredo Airlines

=== Chile ===
- Santiago (SCL)
  - LATAM

=== Ecuador ===
- Quito (UIO)
  - Avianca Ecuador
  - LAN Ecuador
- Guayaquil (GYE)
  - LAN Ecuador

=== Paraguay ===
- Asunción (ASU)
  - LATAM Paraguay
  - Amaszonas Paraguay
  - Sol del Paraguay
- Ciudad del Este (AGT)
  - Sol del Paraguay (defunct)

=== Peru ===
- Lima (LIM)
  - LATAM Perú
  - Sky Airline
  - JetSmart
  - Star Perú

=== Trinidad and Tobago ===
- Port of Spain (POS)
  - Caribbean Airlines
  - Amerijet

=== Venezuela ===
- Caracas
  - Aeropostal
  - Aserca Airlines
  - Conviasa
  - Santa Barbara Airlines
  - Venezolana de Aviacion (focus city)
  - Vensecar
- Barcelona
  - Avior Airlines
