= List of companies of Cameroon =

Location of Cameroon

Cameroon is a country in Central Africa. Cameroon's per-capita GDP (Purchasing power parity) was estimated as US$2,300 in 2008, one of the ten highest in sub-Saharan Africa. Major export markets include France, Italy, South Korea, Spain, and the United Kingdom. Cameroon is aiming to become an emerging country by 2035.

Cameroon has had a decade of strong economic performance, with GDP growing at an average of 4% per year. During the 2004–2008 period, public debt was reduced from over 60% of GDP to 10% and official reserves quadrupled to over USD 3 billion. Cameroon is part of the Bank of Central African States (of which it is the dominant economy), the Customs and Economic Union of Central Africa (UDEAC) and the Organization for the Harmonization of Business Law in Africa (OHADA). Its currency is the CFA franc.

== Notable firms ==
This list includes notable companies with primary headquarters located in the country. The industry and sector follow the Industry Classification Benchmark taxonomy. Organizations which have ceased operations are included and noted as defunct.

Notable companies Status: P=Private, S=State; A=Active, D=Defunct
Name	Industry	Sector	Headquarters	Founded	Notes	Status	
Afriland First Bank	Financials	Banks	Yaoundé	1987	Bank, previously Caisse Commune d'Epargne et d'Investissement	P	A
Air Leasing Cameroon	Consumer services	Airlines	Douala	2005	Charter airline	P	A
Brasseries du Cameroun	Consumer goods	Brewers	Douala	1948	Brewery	P	A
Camair-Co	Consumer services	Airlines	Douala	2006	Airline	P	A
Cameroon Development Corporation	Consumer goods	Farming & fishing	Douala	1947	Agricultural investments and marketing	P	A
CAMPOST	Industrials	Delivery services	Yaoundé	2004	Postal services	S	A
Camrail	Industrials	Railroads	Douala	1999	Railway	P	A
Camtel	Telecommunications	Fixed line telecommunications	Yaoundé	1998	State-owned	S	A
Cargo Airways International	Industrials	Delivery services	Douala	2010	Cargo airline	P	D
Commercial Bank Cameroon	Financials	Banks	Douala	1997	Commercial bank	P	A
Douala Stock Exchange	Financials	Investment services	Douala	2001	Exchange	P	A
Elysian Airlines	Industrials	Delivery services	Yaoundé	2006	Cargo airline	P	A
National Airways Cameroon	Consumer services	Airlines	Yaoundé	1999	Airline, defunct 2009	P	D
National Financial Credit Bank	Financials	Banks	Douala	1989	Commercial bank	P	A
Section Liaison Air Yaoundé	Consumer services	Airlines	Yaoundé	?	State-owned airline	S	A
Société Nationale des Hydrocarbures	Oil & gas	Exploration & production	Yaoundé	1980	Oil and gas	S	A
Union Bank of Cameroon	Financials	Banks	Douala	1999	Commercial bank	P	A

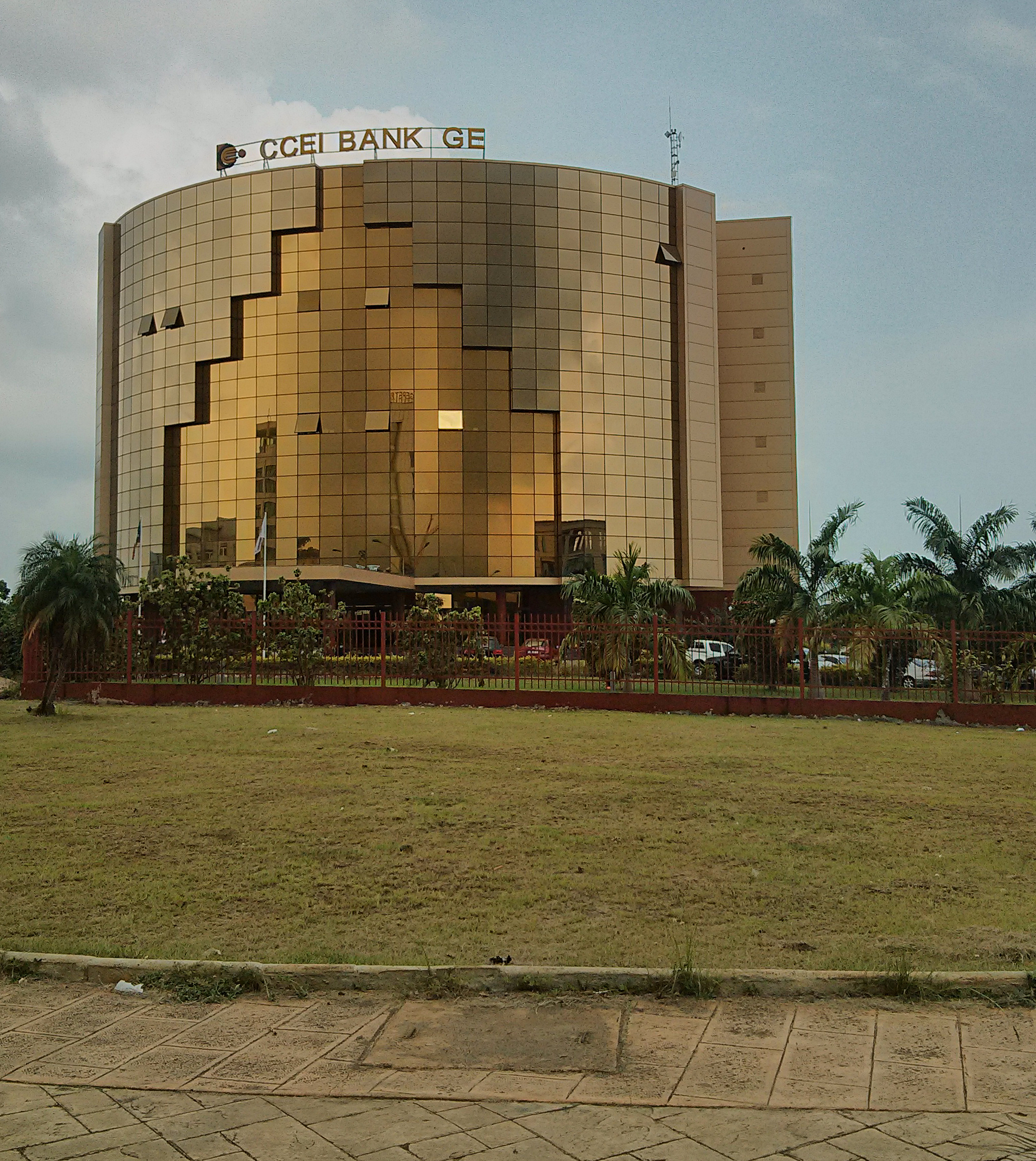
Afriland First Bank headquarters in Malabo.

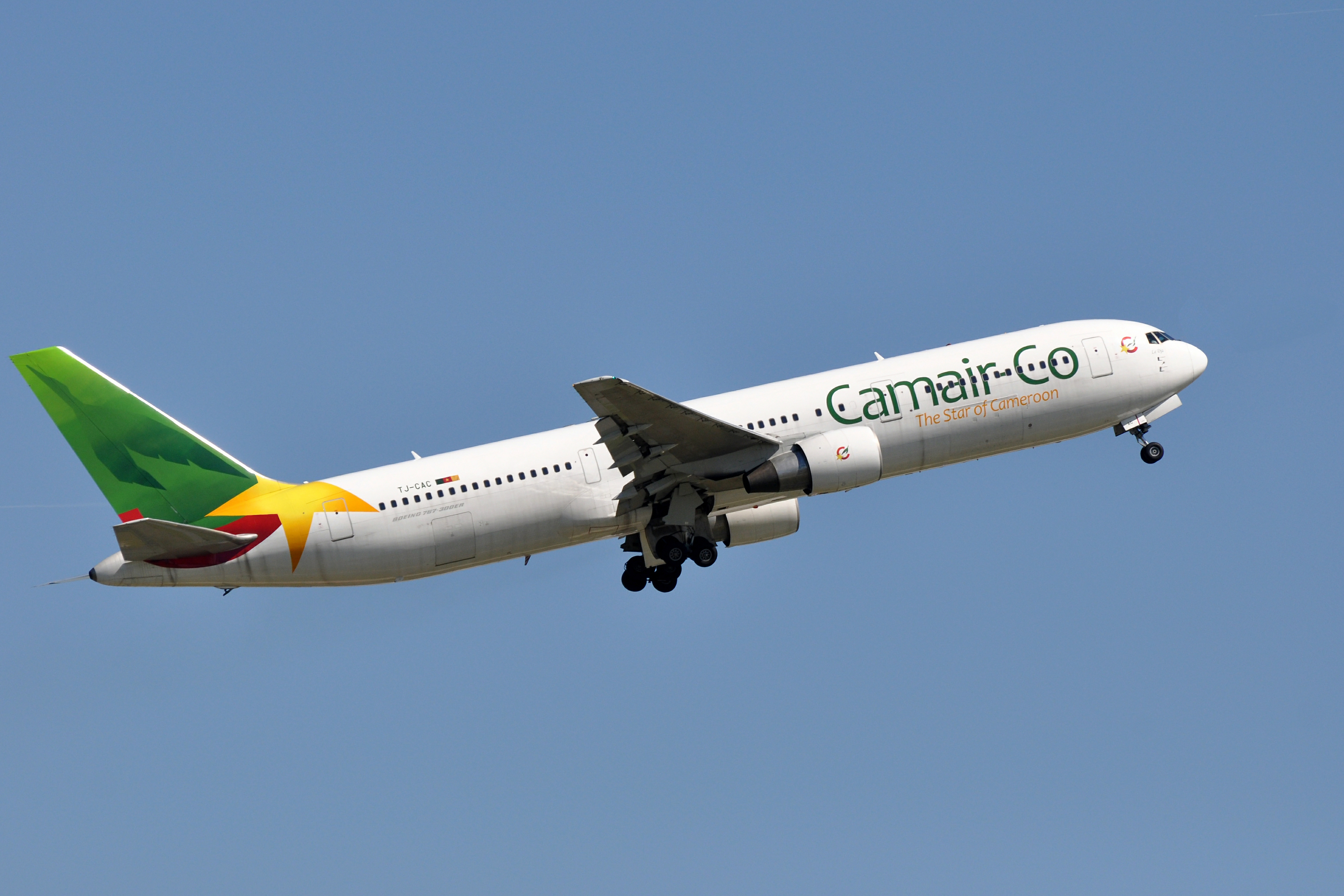
A Camair-Co Boeing 767 at Charles de Gaulle Airport.

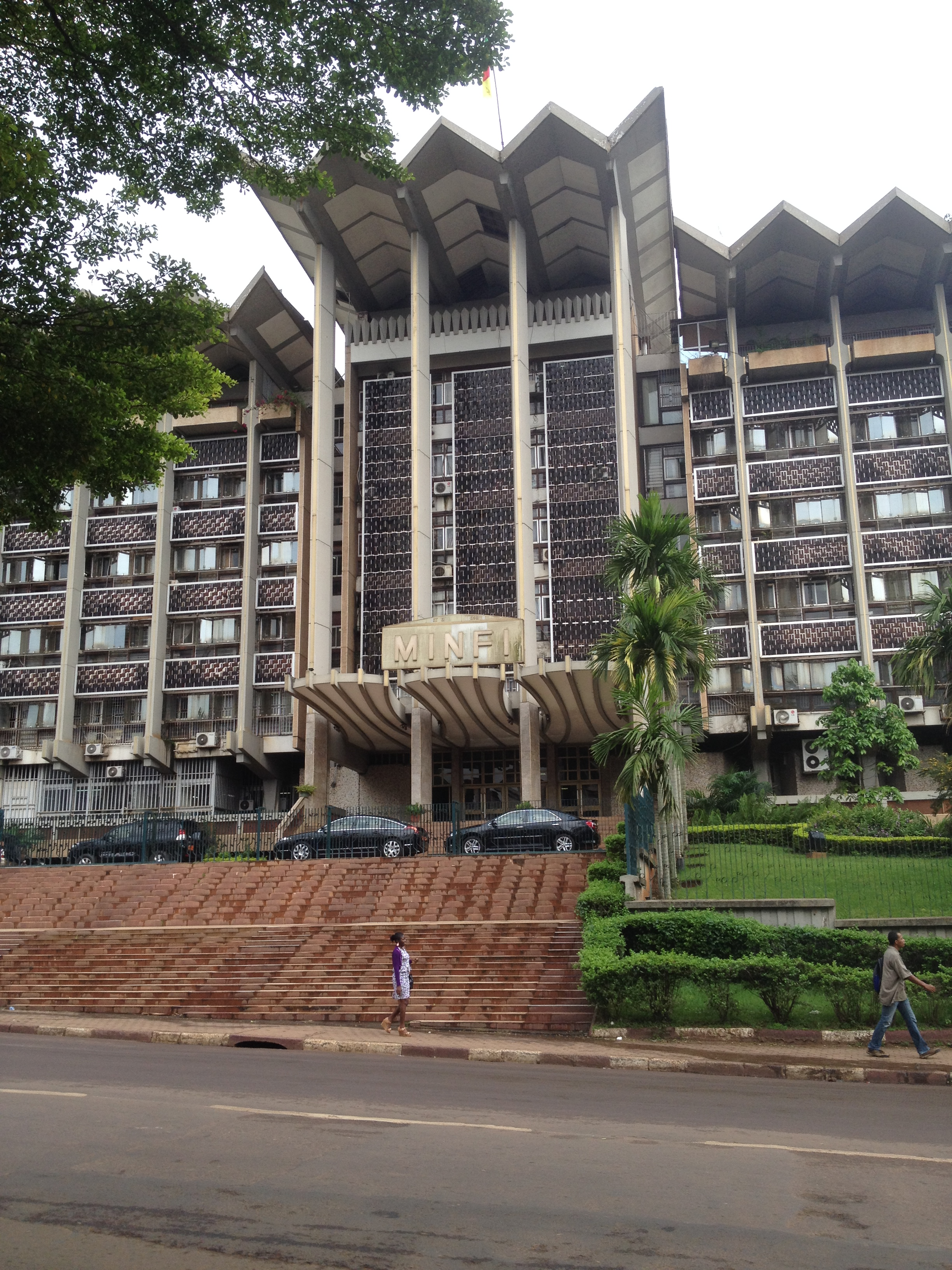
Finance Ministry in Yaoundé.

== See also ==
- List of airlines of Cameroon
- List of banks in Cameroon
