= List of defunct airlines of Cameroon =

This is a list of defunct airlines of Cameroon.

Airline	Image	IATA	ICAO	Callsign	Commenced operations	Ceased operations	Notes
Afrique Chart'Air			FRQ	CHARTER AFRIQUE	2001	2002	
Air Affaires Afrique		6R			1978	2003	
Air Cameroun					1953	1971	Operated Curtiss C-46, Douglas C-47, Douglas C-54, Lockheed Constellation
Air Inter Cameroon			AIC	INTER-CAMEROON	2000	2005	Operated Boeing 737-200
Avient Cameroon		HC		SANAGA	2007	2013	Operated McDonnell Douglas DC-10
Axis International Lines		O8			2005	2006	Renamed to Axis Lines International
Axis Lines International		O8			2005	2006	
Cameroon Air Transport		KC			1962	1970	Operated de Havilland Dove, Dornier Do 28, BN-2 Islander
Cameroon Airlines		UY	UYC	CAM-AIR	1971	2008	
Cameroon Helicopters					1984	2005	Operated Aerospatiale Alouette
Cargo Airways International			TNF		2010	2010	
CHC Cameroon					2005	2009	Established as Schreiner Airways Cameroon. Operated DHC Dash 8
Cotair					1998	2001	Operated Beech 1900
Elysian AL		E4	GIE		2006	2013	
Equa2c		EF		FLY CAMINTER	2014	2016	
Gulf Air					2002	2003	
JetFly.com					2002	2006	Operated Dornier 228
National Airways Cameroon		9O			1999	2008	
Regie Air Cameroun					1950	1953	Operated Beech 18, Douglas DC-3
Schreiner Airways Cameroon					1966	2005	Rebranded CHC Cameroon
Société de Transports Aériens Camerounais					1951	1971	Operated Douglas DC-3
Unifly.Com					2002	2005	
Unitair Cameroun					1992	1995	Operated DHC-6 Twin Otter

== See also ==
- List of airlines of Cameroon
- List of airports in Cameroon
