= List of airlines of Cameroon =

This is a list of airlines currently operating in Cameroon:

Airline	IATA	ICAO	Callsign	Image
African Lines				
Air Leasing Cameroon				
Camair-Co	QC	CRC	CAMAIRCO	
Cargo Airways International				
Section Liaison Air Yaoundé				

== See also ==
- List of defunct airlines of Cameroon
- List of airlines
- List of defunct airlines of Africa
