= Air Leasing Cameroon =

Cameroonian airline

IATA	ICAO	Call sign
-	-	-
- Hubs: Douala International Airport
- Fleet size: 1
- Destinations: 6
- Headquarters: Douala, Cameroon
- Website: https://www.airleasing.com/

Air Leasing Cameroon is an air charter company based in Douala, Cameroon.

== Destinations ==
- Cameroon - Cameroon
  - Douala - Douala International Airport
  - Garoua - Garoua International Airport
  - Maroua - Salak Airport
  - Yaoundé - Yaoundé Nsimalen International Airport
- Chad - Chad
  - N'Djamena - N'Djamena International Airport
- Equatorial Guinea - Equatorial Guinea
  - Malabo - Malabo International Airport

== Fleet ==
As of August 2019, the Air Leasing Cameroon fleet consists of the following aircraft:

Air Leasing Cameroon Fleet
Aircraft	Total	Orders	Passengers (Business/Economy)	Notes
Fokker F28-4000	1	0	8/55	TJ-ALG
Total	1	0		

The airline had previously operated a further two Fokker F28 aircraft.
