= Salak (disambiguation) =

Salak is a species of palm tree.

Salak may also refer to:

- Mount Salak, a mountain in West Java, Indonesia
- Salak, North Sumatra, a place in Indonesia
- Salak, Iran, a village in South Khorasan Province, Iran
- Salak Airport, an airport near Maroua, Cameroon
- Salak, Cameroon a village in Cameroon
- Salak Expressway, a highway in Klang Valley, Malaysia
