= Flight 3701 =

Flight 3701 may refer to:

- Cameroon Airlines Flight 3701, crashed after losing control of the aircraft on December 3, 1995
- Pinnacle Airlines Flight 3701, crashed after a dual-engine flame-out on October 14, 2004
