= Cameroon Airlines Flight 786 =

1984 aviation accident

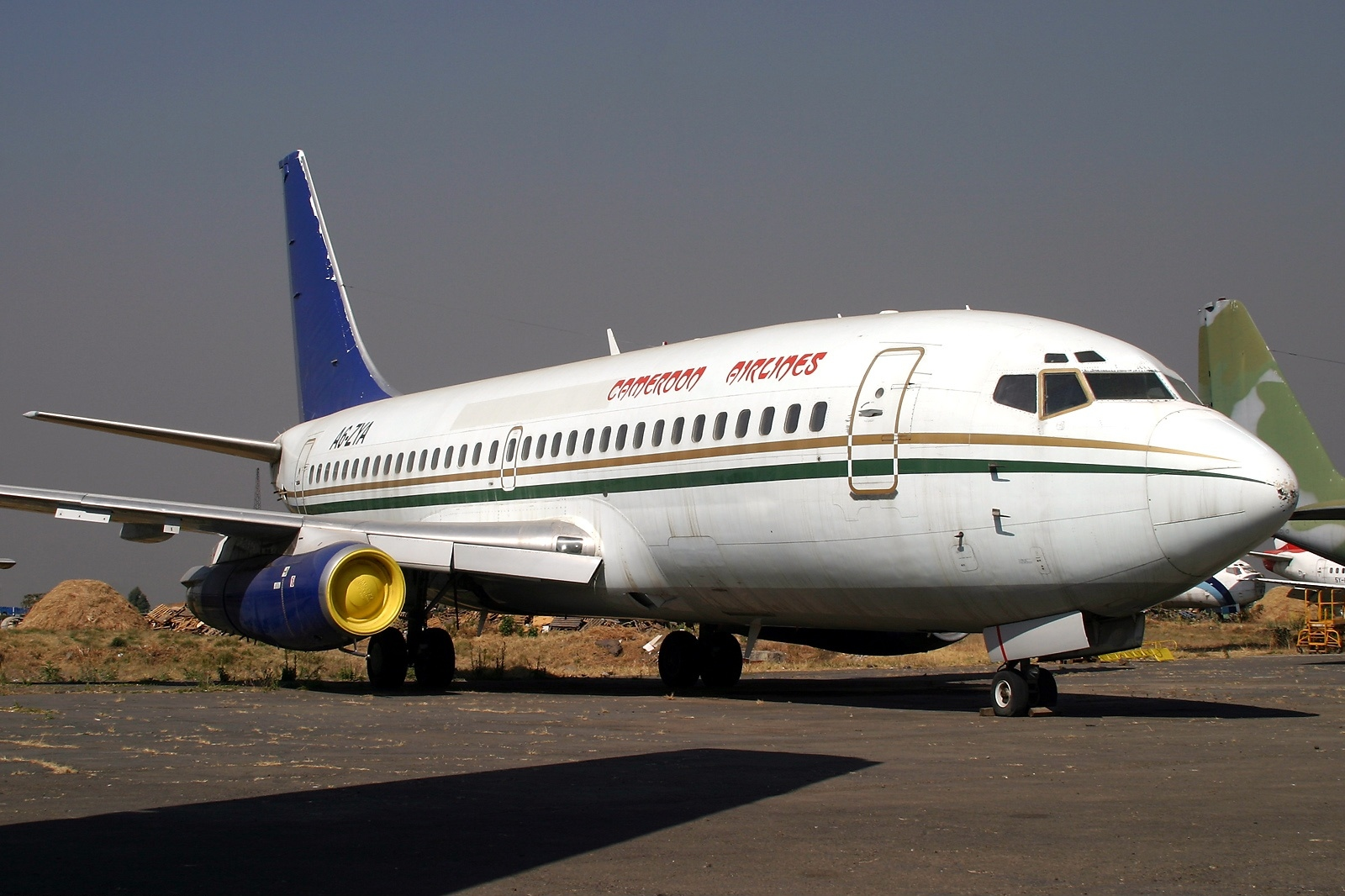
- A Cameroon Airlines Boeing 737-200 similar to the accident aircraft

Accident
- Date: 30 August 1984
- Summary: Fire following uncontained engine failure
- Site: Douala International Airport, Douala, Cameroon; 4°0′22″N 9°43′8″E

Aircraft
- Aircraft type: Boeing 737-2H7C
- Operator: Cameroon Airlines
- Registration: TJ-CBD
- Flight origin: Douala International Airport
- Stopover: Garoua International Airport
- Destination: Yaoundé Nsimalen International Airport
- Occupants: 116
- Passengers: 109
- Crew: 7
- Fatalities: 2
- Injuries: 0
- Survivors: 114

Cameroon Airlines Flight 786 was a Boeing 737-200, registration TJ-CBD, operating as a scheduled domestic passenger flight from Douala International Airport, Cameroon (ICAO: FKKD), to Garoua via Yaoundé. On 30 August 1984, as the aircraft was taxiing out for takeoff with 109 passengers and a crew of 7 on board, its number two engine suffered an uncontained compressor failure, which started a fire. All occupants were able to evacuate the aircraft, but two passengers died due to fire outside the cabin. The aircraft burned to the ground and was declared a total loss. The cause of the engine failure has never been determined.

== Accident sequence ==
As the aircraft was taxiing out in preparation for takeoff, a high-pressure compressor disk in the number two (right side) Pratt & Whitney JT8D-15 engine failed and disintegrated, with fragments damaging the right wing and perforating the fuel tank. The fuel began leaking from the ruptured tank onto the ground below the aircraft, and a fire was ignited. All occupants were able to evacuate the aircraft, but two passengers died due to the fire outside. The plane was completely destroyed.

== Aftermath ==
According to Cameroon Airlines Chief Pilot (ret.) Jean Louis Angounou, interviewed in May 2009 on Le Jour Quotidien, the exact cause of the accident has never been determined because "in Cameroon, some inquiries begin but never come to an end."

== See also ==
- List of accidents and incidents involving commercial aircraft
