= Spriggs Payne Airport =

Commercial airport in Monrovia, Liberia

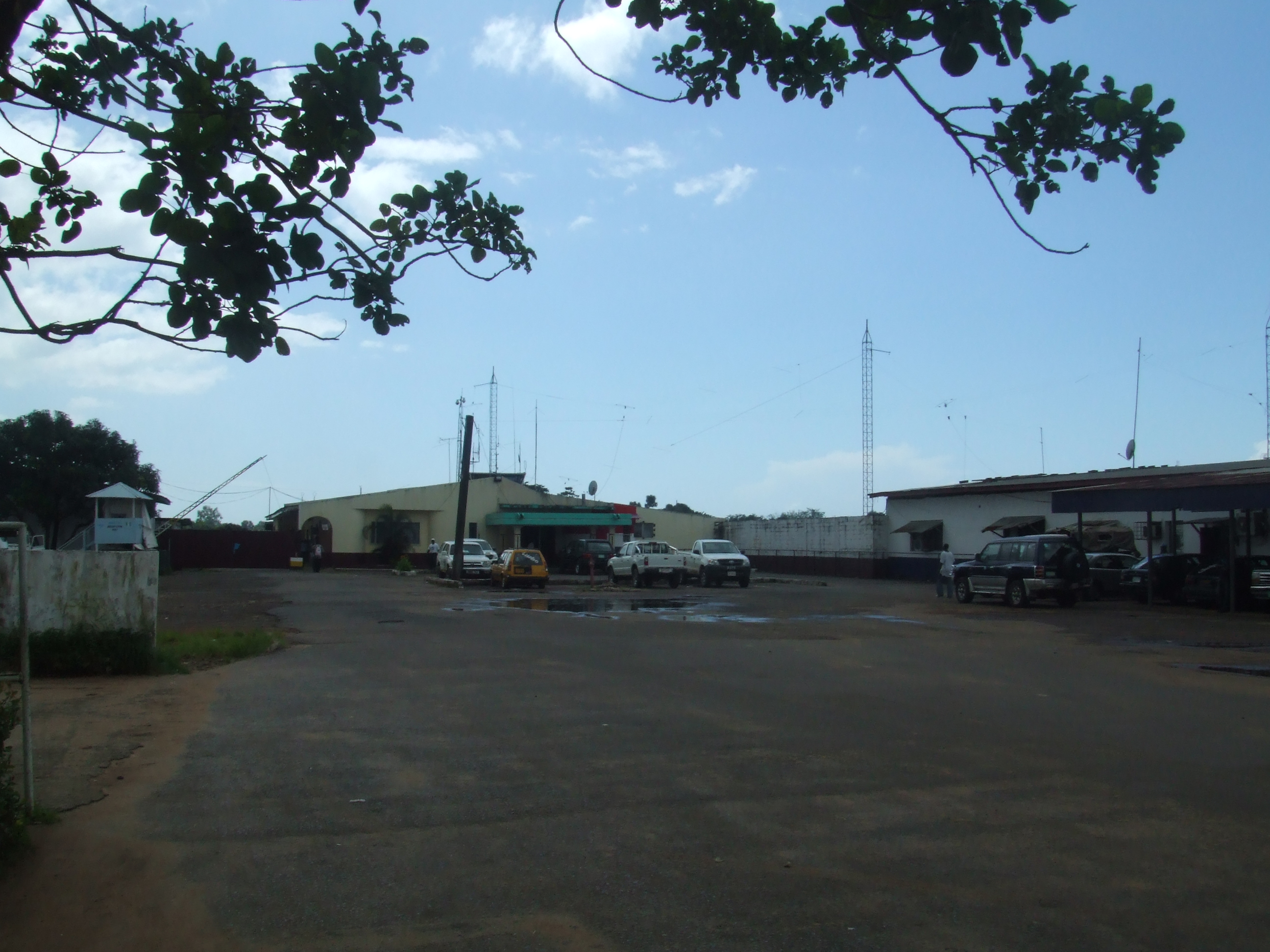
- The exterior of the main terminal at Spriggs Payne Airport
- IATA: MLW; ICAO: GLMR

Summary
- Airport type: Public
- Serves: Monrovia, Liberia
- Elevation AMSL: 25 ft (7.6 m)
- Coordinates: 06°17′21″N 010°45′31″W

Map
- Location in Liberia

Runways
Direction	Length		Surface
Direction	ft	m	Surface
05/23	6,000	1,829	Asphalt
- Source: DAFIF

James Spriggs Payne Airport (IATA: MLW, ICAO: GLMR) is an airport located 5 kilometres (3 mi) from downtown Monrovia, the capital of the Republic of Liberia in West Africa. The airfield is located within the busy and thickly settled Sinkor section of the city, and is therefore convenient to the business and political districts of the capital. Whereas Roberts International Airport is the primary aviation facility for the city and indeed the entire country, Spriggs Payne has the only other paved runway in Liberia and once had the only other international commercial flights into and out of Liberia. The airport is named after James Spriggs Payne who was president of the Republic of Liberia in 1868–70 and again in 1876–78.

== History and scheduled services ==
Spriggs Payne was the primary location for domestic services within Liberia since the 1950s. Since early 1991, Spriggs Payne has handled limited international flights. The airport served as a base for ECOMOG troops during the Liberian Civil War and suffered damage during that conflict, including a rocket attack by rebels in April 1996 which destroyed several aircraft.

From 2008 until mid-2010, scheduled commercial services were operated by Cameroon-based Elysian Airlines. The carrier established a significant operation at Spriggs Payne, with weekly services to Freetown, Sierra Leone; Conakry, Guinea, and Banjul, The Gambia with connections to onward destinations such as Lagos, Nigeria and Douala, Cameroon. Elysian also connected the airport to several domestic destinations, with a weekly round-trip to Harper, and occasional stops in Greenville.

Elysian ceased operating in mid-2010, and the airport was left for a period without any scheduled commercial service. Later in 2010, Ethiopian Airlines changed its operations to Liberia, withdrawing its mainline jet services from Robertsfield to Accra and Addis Ababa. This was quickly replaced by the services of its affiliate, ASKY Airlines which began operating from Spriggs Payne, flying initially to Accra, Banjul and Abidjan with onward service to its hub at Lomé. In early 2011, the Banjul service was dropped, and the Abidjan service was substituted for a weekly non-stop flight to Bamako.

In January 2011, newly formed Fly 6ix, initially designated as the new national airline of Sierra Leone began operating from Freetown with a single Embraer ERJ-135 regional jet. The airline's network included twice-weekly service to Spriggs Payne from Freetown and Conakry, with connecting service to Banjul, although the airline had ceased operations by 2012.

Spriggs Payne underwent a runway refurbishment during 2011 and 2012, necessitating the cessation of most flight operations. During this construction, ASKY transferred its Liberia operations to Robertsfield. However, once the runway resurfacing was complete, ASKY returned to Spriggs in mid-2013, and as of April 2014 offered a daily flight to Accra with onward same-plane service to Lomé, as well as multi-week flights to Lungi International Airport in Sierra Leone, and a new service to Bissau. As of November 2014, Spriggs Payne Airport were suspended due to the ongoing ebola outbreak in Liberia. ASKY resumed flights to Monrovia starting November 2017.

On January 14, 2023, domestic Liberian airline Eco World began domestic service from Spriggs Payne Airport to Maryland, Sinoe, Grand Gedeh, and Lofa Counties, with plans to offer flights to Ahmed Sékou Touré International Airport in Conakry, Guinea, and Lungi International Airport in Freetown, Sierra Leone.

== Facilities ==
The airport facility consists of a collection of small, single-story buildings. The terminal itself has a passenger x-ray screening area at the entrance, a waiting room with satellite televisions, and a small bar. The airport is also equipped with immigration facilities to handle international arrivals. Elysian Airlines operates a ticket office outside the terminal building, and the United Nations occupies several operational offices facing the airside tarmac. In fact, the primary activity at Spriggs Payne consists of UN helicopter and aircraft operations.

== Accidents and incidents ==
- On 10 June 1978, a Vickers Viscount 9G-ACL of West African Air Cargo was damaged beyond economic repair when the undercarriage collapsed on landing.
