= Axis Lines International =

Cameroonian airline (2006)

IATA	ICAO	Call sign
O8	-	-
- Founded: 2006
- Ceased operations: 2006
- Hubs: Douala International Airport
- Headquarters: Douala, Cameroon

Axis Lines International was a start-up airline planned to be based in Douala, Cameroon. It was intended to fly regional services with two McDonnell Douglas MD-80 aircraft and international services to Brussels, Madrid and Paris with a Boeing 767-300ER.

== History ==
The predecessor of Axis Lines International was Axis International Lines, a Cameroon-based airline that was operational in 2005 and 2006. When bankruptcy was declared, some of the old staff and former Cameroon Airlines staff tried to raise a new airline under a slightly different name in late 2006. Further help came from local and Spanish investors.

Axis Lines International never became operational. There was never a formal declaration of bankruptcy, but airline and staff have completely dissolved.
