= Caledonian Airways Flight 153 =

1962 deadly plane crash in Douala, Cameroon

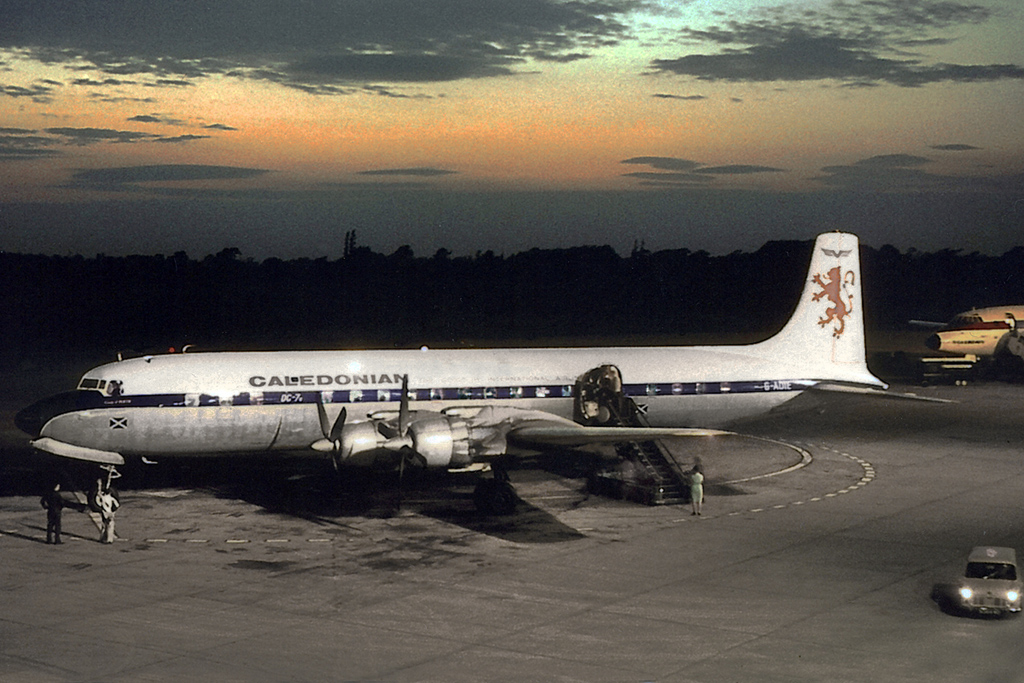
- A Caledonian Airways Douglas DC-7 similar to the aircraft involved in the accident

Accident
- Date: 4 March 1962
- Summary: Undetermined
- Site: Douala International Airport

Aircraft
- Aircraft type: Douglas DC-7C
- Aircraft name: Star of Robbie Burns
- Operator: Caledonian Airways
- Registration: G-ARUD
- Flight origin: Luxembourg - Findel Airport
- 1st stopover: Maputo International Airport
- 2nd stopover: Douala International Airport
- Last stopover: Lisbon Portela Airport
- Destination: Luxembourg - Findel Airport
- Occupants: 111
- Passengers: 101
- Crew: 10
- Fatalities: 111
- Survivors: 0

Caledonian Airways Flight 153 was a multi-leg nonscheduled passenger service from Luxembourg via Khartoum, Lorenzo Marques (nowadays Maputo), Douala and Lisbon, before heading back to Luxembourg. On 4 March 1962 a Douglas DC-7C flying the route, registration G-ARUD, crashed shortly after takeoff from Douala International Airport, Douala, Cameroon in a swamp on the edge of a jungle 2.4 kilometres (1.5 mi; 1.3 nmi) off the airport. It is the deadliest crash of a DC-7. It is also the second-deadliest accident in Cameroon surpassed only by Kenya Airways Flight 507.

== Aircraft ==
The aircraft was leased from Sabena in November 1961 and was due to returned back to Sabena at end of November 1962. The aircraft was named Star of Robbie Burns and had flown more than 14,000 flying hours prior to the accident.

== Accident ==
Nationality	Crew	Passengers	Total
France	0	90	90
Cameroon/France	10	0	10
United Kingdom	0	1	1
United States	0	1	1
Total	10	101	111

The aircraft was scheduled to operate the fourth leg of flight number 153 from Douala to Lisbon, Portugal. On board were a total of 101 passengers and 10 crew. 100 total on board were French nationals and dual Cameroonian-French nationals, including 90 passengers and 10 crew members.

The aircraft lined up with Runway 12 at Douala International Airport and began the takeoff procedure. An air traffic controller in the tower at the airport reportedly saw the aircraft lift off the runway, approximately inline with the instrument landing system transmitter 2400 metres after the release of its brakes. They also noticed that the aircraft did not seem to have its landing lights on.

Witnesses reported that the aircraft had an unusually long takeoff run and climbed slowly before disappearing behind the trees and the sky was lit by a fire. The air traffic controller told the investigation that the aircraft struggled to gain lift and its anti-collision beacon was seen to light up at low altitude before disappearing behind trees. It was reported that the left wing of the aircraft struck trees in complete darkness, diving on its port wing for over 130 metres, and then crashing into a creek running through the jungle. The aircraft then impacted with the ground and exploded in flames.

The location of the accident was close to the airport but very difficult to reach by rescuers, who could only attain the accident site by swimming in the high tide waters of the nearby creek almost 6 hours after the accident.

== Investigation ==
The accident investigation was undertaken by the Directorate of Civil Aviation in Cameroon. The inquiry was held in Paris, as Cameroon was a former French colony that had recently become independent.

Several scenarios were suggested in the inquiry. One such suggestion was an engine failure; however, after an investigation of the power plants and the propeller governors, this idea was eliminated. It was also suggested that the landing gear may have been operated incorrectly; however, the inquiry established that the nose wheel and starboard undercarriage were up and locked, and whilst they could not definitely prove that the port undercarriage was up and locked, the board decided that it was likely up and locked.

The inquiry then discovered that the plane was 1040 kg heavier than the load sheet's figure. However, even with this minor error, the aircraft should have been able to take off from Douala. Although the investigators could not rule out an error in V2 resulting from the load error, they determined that this would not have been an error serious enough to bring down the plane.

The Inquiry published its report on 26 July 1963 in Paris, and they were unable to determine with "absolute certainty" what had caused the accident. They found that there was evidence to support the theory that an elevator spring tab mechanism may have jammed and that this would have resulted in abnormal elevator control forces being required during take-off. Their investigation showed that this would be consistent with a long take off run and the risk of losing height when the flaps were retracted.

There were a number of factors that the inquiry could not rule out, including instrumentation failure, improper operation of the flaps, electrical failure, or an unforeseen incident in the cockpit. The inquiry was also unable to explain why the aircraft deviated from its flight path, or why the landing lights were off.
