= Cameroon Airlines Flight 3701 =

1995 aviation accident in Cameroon

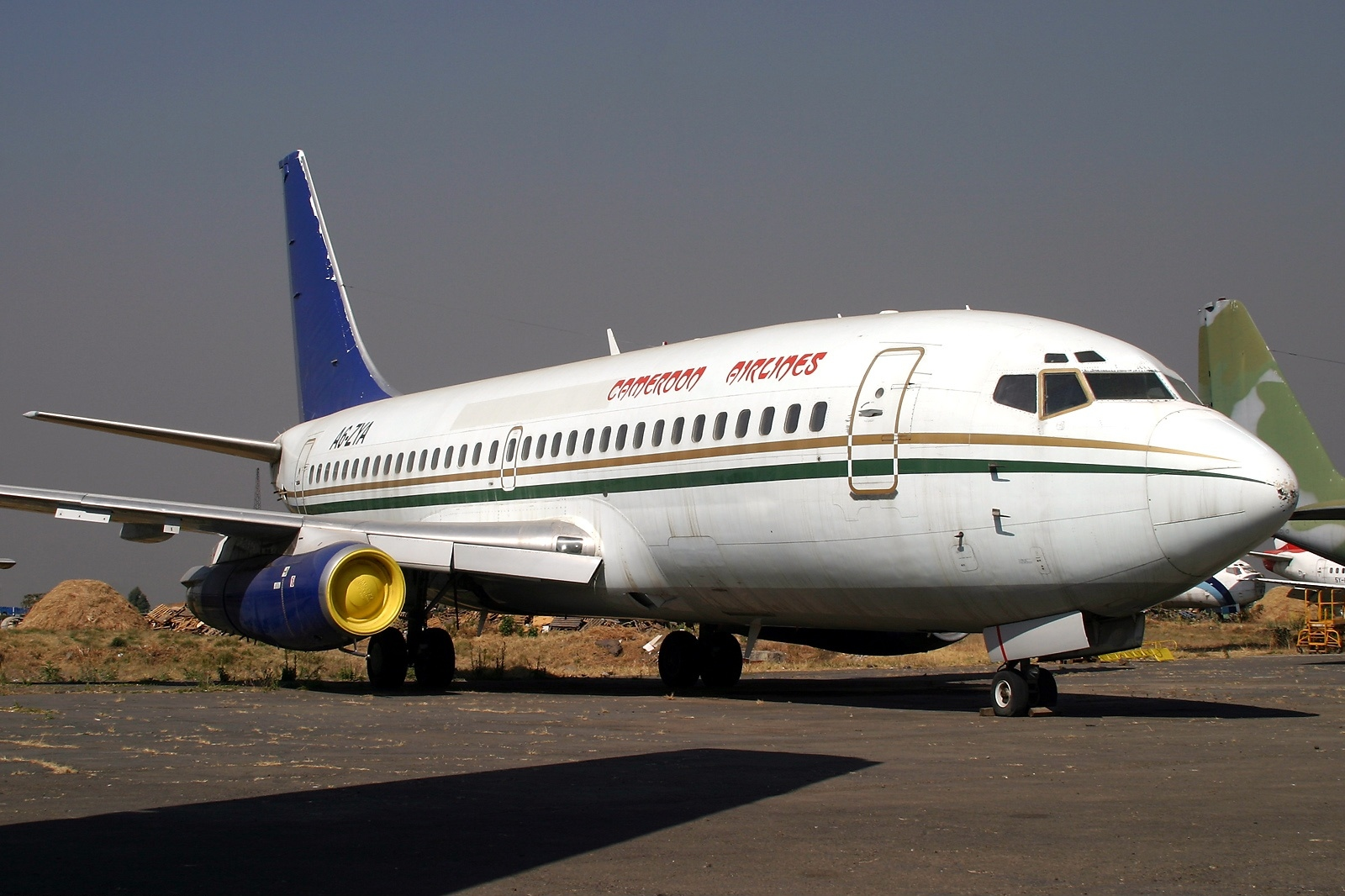
- A Cameroon Airlines Boeing 737-200, similar to the aircraft involved

Accident
- Date: 3 December 1995
- Summary: Loss of control on go around due to thrust asymmetry
- Site: Near Douala International Airport, Douala, Cameroon; 3°59′42.54″N 9°42′31.199″E

Aircraft
- Aircraft type: Boeing 737-2K9(A)
- Aircraft name: Nyong
- Operator: Cameroon Airlines
- IATA flight No.: UY3701
- ICAO flight No.: UYC3701
- Registration: TJ-CBE
- Flight origin: Cadjehoun Airport, Cotonou, Benin
- Destination: Douala International Airport, Douala, Cameroon
- Occupants: 76
- Passengers: 71
- Crew: 5
- Fatalities: 71
- Injuries: 5
- Survivors: 5

On 3 December 1995, Cameroon Airlines Flight 3701, a Boeing 737-200 operating a scheduled international passenger flight from Cadjehoun Airport, Benin, to Douala International Airport, Cameroon, crashed on its second approach to Douala after it lost control following a loss of power in its left engine. Of the 76 occupants, 68 passengers and 3 crew members were killed. Three passengers and two crew members survived injured.

== Background ==
=== Aircraft ===
The aircraft involved in the accident, manufactured in 1985, was a Boeing 737-2K9 registered as TJ-CBE. Named Nyong, it was equipped with two Pratt & Whitney JT8D-15A engines. The aircraft had flown a total of 18,746 hours in 23,233 flights. It was directly acquired from Boeing, and it was delivered to the airline on 30 August 1985.

=== Passengers and crew ===
There were 76 people on board the flight: 71 passengers and 5 crew members. The captain was 45-year-old Sali Younoussa Aman. He was hired by Cameroon Airlines in 1983 and had accumulated a total of 7,990 flight hours, 5,923 hours of which were on the Boeing 737. The first officer was 44-year-old first officer Claude Emile Lombo. He was hired by the airline in 1978 and had accumulated 5,850 hours of total flight experience with 4,317 of them on the Boeing 737. The other crew members consisted of 46-year old chief flight attendant Julienne Moudissa Silo, flight attendant Marguerite Welisane Nyambe, and a security agent.

Nationalities of the occupants
| Country | Crew | Passengers | Total |
|---|---|---|---|
| Cameroon | 5 | 43 | 48 |
| Benin | —N/a | 8 | 8 |
| Nigeria | —N/a | 6 | 6 |
| Senegal | —N/a | 3 | 3 |
| Liberia | —N/a | 2 | 2 |
| Togo | —N/a | 2 | 2 |
| Niger | —N/a | 1 | 1 |
| France | —N/a | 1 | 1 |
| Congo | —N/a | 1 | 1 |
| Mali | —N/a | 1 | 1 |
| Switzerland/Canada (Note: Dual nationality.) | —N/a | 1 | 1 |
| Netherlands | —N/a | 1 | 1 |
| Germany | —N/a | 1 | 1 |
| Total | 5 | 71 | 76 |

== Accident ==
On 3 December 1995, the aircraft, operating a scheduled domestic passenger service from Cadjehoun Airport, Cotonou, Benin, to Douala International Airport, Douala, Cameroun, took off from Cadjehoun Airport. The Boeing 737-200 had 71 passengers and five crew on board and after a one-hour flight was ready to land at Douala International Airport, but as the landing gear was lowered the nose gear light showed that it was not down. The pilots called air traffic control saying that they had landing gear problems and the crew elected to abort the approach. Some minutes later they tried a second approach but the pilots did not see that the engine two was operating at high power while the No. 1 engine was not developing power. The aircraft then entered into a steep dive, hitting two trees and uprooting a third, before crashing in a mangrove swamp around 0.9 nautical miles (1,700 m; 1.0 mi) to the left of the runway centerline. The aircraft burst into flames, killing 71 passengers and crew. Five people survived the accident; they were all seated in the rear section of the aircraft.

== Aftermath ==
In the immediate aftermath, locals aided in rescuing the victims of the crash but also participated in looting victims of their possessions. In 2002, a survivor stated:

The three young men who came to rescue me dispossessed me of my belongings. While two of them were carrying me to their canoe, the third one was rummaging through my pockets. I saw him unfastening my jewels and my watch. But I could not resist him, not only because my strength was failing me, but also because I ran the risk of being abandoned to my fate in this infested area. Before losing consciousness, I even saw them and other guys robbing the dead, since most of the passengers were businessmen and high-profile bureaucrats. I had never seen people sinking as low as these young men did. I think that we are losing moral values in our country.

The New York Times noted that the accident drew international scrutiny to "to the perils of flying in what many consider the world's worst-served region for air travel." Aviation experts argued that Cameroon Airlines' small fleet was pushed to the limit in order to cover its large route network. Airlines that faced similar situations operated their aircraft all day and often in long-haul night flights to Europe. A Cameroonian official stated: "The stress that we are putting on our aircraft and crews has just become intolerable".

=== Speculation and conspiracy theories ===
==== Accusations of technical faults and sabotage ====
The day after the crash, multiple newspapers hypothesized that the aircraft had suffered a mechanical failure, without directly mentioning the airlines' responsibility. Multiple of its employees claimed that the flight crew had refused to board the aircraft, and only gave in after pressure from the airline. Two weeks after the crash, Le Messager blamed the airline for the accident, claiming that the aircraft had been overloaded and negligently maintained. In contrast, L'Expression contended that Air France, no longer maintaining Cameroon Airlines' fleet, had sabotaged the aircraft, backing its claims by claiming to have possessed a copy of the recordings of the flight recorder.

People from Douala and Yaoundé offered political explanations for the crash and questioned the pilot's competence, alleging that he had made a technical error and was a drinker (French: très porté sur la bouteille, lit. 'very fond of the bottle'). One explanation asserted that Cameroonian President Paul Biya and French President Jacques Chirac, working to establish a private Cameroonian airline that would use Airbus aircraft, had sabotaged the 737 to eliminate competition. Another explanation claimed that opponents from northern Cameroon residing in Benin sympathetic to Ahmadou Ahidjo were planning to stage a coup d'état on 4 December; at the time of the crash, Biya was attending the Francophonie Summit. As leaving the summit without explanations would "show his vulnerability", Biya would have then rigged the 737, giving him a pretext to return and prevent the coup.

Other theories included the copilot causing the crash to kill members of a delegation from Cotonou taking part in the summit after being asked to by Northern Cameroonians; the copilot, from Northern Cameroon, was supposedly a Jehovah's Witness who believed in the imminent end of the world. It was later learned that no members of the delegation were onboard. Accusations against Biya and Beninese President Nicéphore Soglo contended that both presidents had sabotaged the 737 in order to accuse Chirac of spoiling the summit. One theory claimed that the Beninese had sabotaged the 737 to punish Bamileke merchants making money off secondhand clothes; another theory claimed that France, seeking to retain its dominance despite having little involvement in Cameroon's economy, sabotaged the 737 to stop Cameroon and the United States from re-establishing relations, under the pretext that it would undermine the reliability of American products. Another belief was that the Rose Cross had sent Biya a "pressing call" that he had accepted, demanding a "catastrophe", to which international aid would be sent in response.

Cameroon Airlines ceased operations in 2008.

=== Lawsuit ===
On 20 February 2025, Emile Christian Bekolo, Cameroon Airlines' liquidater, summoned Boeing and Pratt & Whitney to the Wouri High Court in Douala; the airline claimed CFA 103,100,000,000 (US$164.2 million) in damages in compensation for the crash. Bekolo stated that his case relied heavily on the convictions of Boeing and Pratt & Whitney by the Wouri High Court the previous year regarding Cameroon Airlines Flight 786, a Boeing 737 that caught fire at Douala Airport killing two people, saying that both accidents had "the same cause" and "the same manufacturing defects". The 1985 fire of British Airtours Flight 28M was also cited as similar.

== Investigation ==
The prime minister of Cameroon put into place a Commission of Inquiry that was to perform all necessary investigations. As such, on 7 December 1995, the commission was set up and subsequently commenced its work on 12 December 1995. The cockpit voice recorder (CVR) and flight data recorder (FDR) were opened by the Bureau of Enquiry and Analysis for Civil Aviation Safety (BEA) in their labs. A counter-expertise was also performed by the National Transportation Safety Board in their labs. Both flight recorders were recovered 14 hours after the crash, however they were both destroyed by the post-crash fire, rendering them unusable.

The final report was submitted in February 1996.

The accident report determined the cause of the loss of control and the loss of power to engine No. 1 to be the following:

The probable cause of the accident is a loss of control during a go-around attempt made during a maneuver to reach the runway with degraded performance

Seriously contributing to this:

1. The detachment by structural fatigue of a first stage compressor blade of the No. 1 engine which resulted in a loss of power and destabilization of the trajectory when landing
2. The late or slow execution of the go-around procedure with an unidentified single-engine configuration, leading to irreversible loss of speed.

— Accident report
