= Ngaoundéré Airport =

Airport in Adamawa, Cameroon

- IATA: NGE; ICAO: FKKN

Summary
- Airport type: Public
- Operator: Government
- Serves: Ngaoundéré, Cameroon
- Elevation AMSL: 3,655 ft (1,114 m)
- Coordinates: 07°21′25.7″N 013°33′33.1″E

Map
- Location of N'Gaoundere Airport in Cameroon

Runways
| Direction | Length | | Surface |
| Direction | m | ft | Surface |
|---|---|---|---|
| 02/20 | 2,700 | 8,858 | Asphalt |

Statistics (2022)
- Passengers: 24,117
- Source: DAFIF

Ngaoundéré Airport (IATA: NGE, ICAO: FKKN), also known as N'Gaoundéré Airport, is an airport serving Ngaoundéré (also spelled N'Gaoundéré), the capital of the Adamawa Province in Cameroon.

== Airlines and destinations ==
| Airlines | Destinations |
|---|---|
| Camair-Co | Douala, Yaoundé |
