= Salak, Cameroon =

Village in Cameroon

Coordinates: 10°28′N 14°15′E

Salak is a village in the Far North Region of Cameroon, near the Salak Airport.

== Geography ==
Salak is approximately 12 kilometers south of Maroua, located close to the Nigerian and Chad borders to the west and east, respectively. It positioned near the Mayo boula river, which is the site of a bridge, and a part of the watershed of Lake Chad.

== Rapid Intervention Battalion ==
Salak is the site of a Rapid Intervention Battalion (BIR) military base for the Cameroonian Armed Forces.
