= Elysian Airlines =

Cameroonian cargo airline

IATA	ICAO	Call sign
E4	GIE	-
- Hubs: Nsimalen International Airport, Conakry International Airport
- Fleet size: 1
- Destinations: 9 cargo (+charter)
- Headquarters: Yaoundé, Cameroon
- Key people: Dr Yomi Ojetunde, Prof Julius Oben
- Website: http://www.elysianairlines.com/

Elysian Airlines is a cargo airline based at Yaoundé Nsimalen International Airport in Yaoundé, Cameroon, and had additional significant operations at Spriggs Payne Airport in Monrovia, Liberia, and at Conakry International Airport in Conakry, Guinea. According to the airline's website, it was founded in January 2006 as a public limited company, with 51% of shares held by a Cameroonian consortium and the remainder owned by a British/South African group. Elysian's scheduled operations stopped in 2010, but resumed in 2015.

Elysian Airlines began with a domestic network in Cameroon, but has since expanded rapidly westward. As of November 2008, the airline offered an extensive network of international services across West Africa, as well as a spread of domestic flights within several countries. The airline also offers charter services. Services restarted in 2015, using a Bae 146 for schedule routes as well as charter. An Airbus A310F was purchased in 2015 and is used for Cargo services in Africa, Europe and the Middle East.

== Destinations ==
- Cameroon (Douala, Garoua, Maroua, Ngaoundéré, Yaoundé)
- Ivory Coast (Abidjan)
- Gambia (Banjul)
- Guinea (Conakry, Kankan, Kissidougou, Labé, Nzerekore, Siguiri)
- Liberia (Greenville, Harper, Monrovia (Spriggs Payne), Zwedru)
- Senegal (Dakar)
- Sierra Leone (Bo, Freetown, Hastings, Kenema, Makeni)

== Fleet ==
As of July 2026, Elysian Airlines operates the following aircraft:

Elysian Airlines Fleet
Aircraft	Total	Orders	Passengers (Y)	Notes
BAe Jetstream 32	1			

The Elysian Airlines fleet consisted of (as of August 2016): 1 BAe 146-200. The airline also previously operated a further three British Aerospace 146 aircraft and an Airbus A310.
