= Garoua International Airport =

Airport in North Province, Cameroon

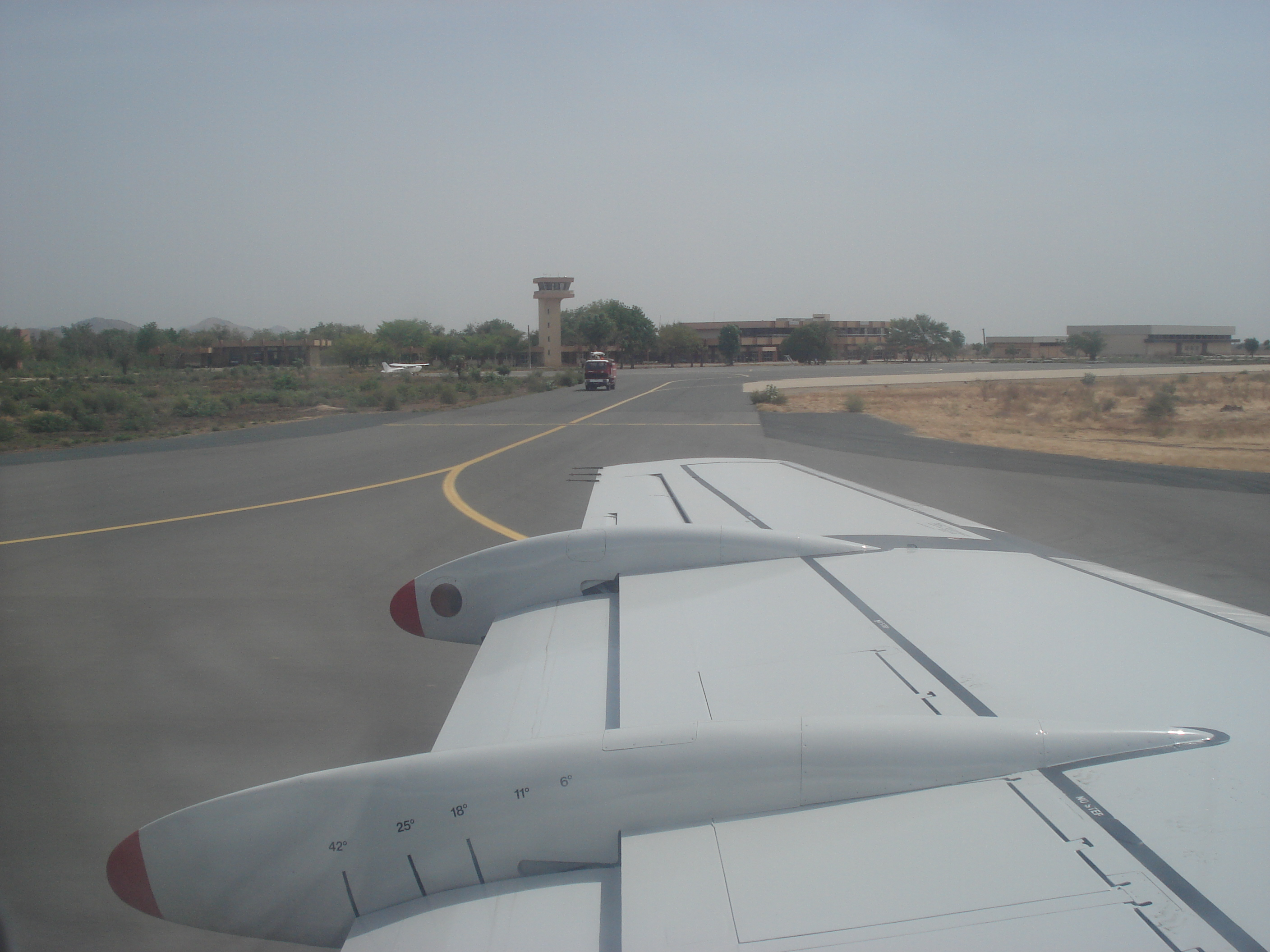
- IATA: GOU; ICAO: FKKR

Summary
- Airport type: Public / Military
- Operator: Aéroports du Cameroun (ADC)
- Serves: Garoua, Cameroon
- Elevation AMSL: 794 ft / 242 m
- Coordinates: 09°20′09″N 013°22′12″E

Map
- Location within Cameroon

Runways
| Direction | Length | | Surface |
| Direction | m | ft | Surface |
|---|---|---|---|
| 09/27 | 3,363 | 11,032 | Asphalt |
- Source: DAFIF

Garoua Airport (IATA: GOU, ICAO: FKKR), also known as Garoua International Airport, is an airport serving Garoua, the capital of North Province, Cameroon. The airport is used by both civilian and military aircraft.

== Airlines and destinations ==
| Airlines | Destinations |
|---|---|
| Camair-Co | Douala, Yaoundé; Seasonal: Jeddah |
