= Maroua Salak Airport =

Airport in Far North, Cameroon

Salak Airport Aéroport international de Maroua Salak
- IATA: MVR; ICAO: FKKL

Summary
- Airport type: Public
- Operator: Government
- Serves: Maroua
- Location: Salak, Cameroon
- Elevation AMSL: 1,388 ft / 423 m
- Coordinates: 10°27′05″N 014°15′26″E

Map
- Location within Cameroon

Runways
Direction	Length		Surface
Direction	m	ft	Surface
13/31	2,100	6,890	Asphalt
- Source: DAFIF

Salak Airport (French: Aéroport international de Maroua Salak, IATA: MVR, ICAO: FKKL), is an airport serving Maroua, the capital of the Far North Region in Cameroon. The airport is located about 15 km (9 mi) southwest of Maroua, near the village of Salak. It is also known as Maroua Airport or Maroua Salak Airport.

== Airlines and destinations ==
Airlines	Destinations
Camair-Co	Douala, Yaoundé
