= Fly 6ix =

Fly 6ix Airline
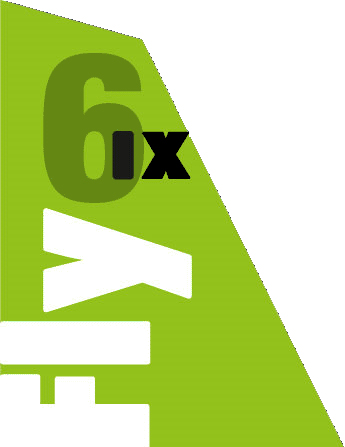
IATA	ICAO	Call sign
-	-	FLYSIX
- Founded: 2010
- Commenced operations: 2011
- Ceased operations: 2012
- Hubs: Lungi International Airport
- Fleet size: 1
- Destinations: 4
- Parent company: Medi-Call Group of Companies
- Headquarters: Freetown, Sierra Leone
- Website: http://www.fly6ix.com/

Fly 6ix is a former passenger airline with its head office in Freetown, Sierra Leone, operating out of Lungi International Airport.

== History ==
The airline was founded in 2010 by the UK-based MediCall Group of companies. Passenger flights commenced in January 2011. At the inauguration of passenger services, Ernest Koroma, President of Sierra Leone, officially designated Fly 6ix as the national carrier of Sierra Leone. Fly 6ix served four West African cities with a single Embraer 135 aircraft. The airline has ceased operating. Fly6ix Limited resolved 3 December 2012 to be wound up voluntarily.

== Former Destinations ==
The Spring 2011 schedule of Fly 6ix Airlines offers weekly connections between the following destinations along the Atlantic coast of West Africa:

Gambia

- Banjul - Banjul International Airport

Guinea

- Conakry - Conakry International Airport

Liberia

- Monrovia - Spriggs Payne Airport

Sierra Leone

- Freetown - Lungi International Airport

== Fleet ==
As of May 2011, Fly 6ix Airline's scheduled operations were undertaken by a single Embraer 135. The aircraft, registered as 5Y-BVY, was originally delivered in 2003 to the American regional carrier Chautauqua Airlines.

Fly 6ix Airline fleet
Aircraft	In service	Passengers
Embraer 135	1	35
Total	1	
