= Section Liaison Air Yaoundé =

Cameroonian airline

IATA	ICAO	Call sign
-	-	-
- Hubs: Yaoundé Nsimalen International Airport
- Fleet size: 1
- Headquarters: Yaoundé, Cameroon

Section Liaison Air Yaoundé is the governmental airline of Cameroon based in Yaoundé. Its main base is Yaoundé Nsimalen International Airport.

== Fleet ==
The Section Liaison Air Yaoundé fleet consists of the following aircraft (as of August 2019):

Section Liaison Air Yaoundé Fleet
Aircraft	Total	Orders	Passengers (Economy)	Notes
Xian MA60	1	0	-	
Total	1	0		

The airline previously operated a single Boeing 727 aircraft.
