= Cargo Airways International =

Cargo airline in Douala, Cameroon

IATA	ICAO	Call sign
-	-	-
- Hubs: Douala International Airport
- Fleet size: 1
- Headquarters: Douala, Cameroon

Cargo Airways International was a cargo airline based in Douala, Cameroon. Its main base is Douala International Airport.

== Fleet ==
As of April 2019, the Cargo Airways International fleet includes the following aircraft:

Cargo Airways International fleet
Aircraft	Total	Orders	Passengers (Economy)	Notes
Boeing 737-200F	1	0	-	
Total	1	0		
