= National Airways Cameroon =

Cameroonian airline (1999–2009)

IATA	ICAO	Call sign
9O	-	-
- Founded: November 1999
- Ceased operations: 2009
- Hubs: Yaoundé Nsimalen International Airport
- Headquarters: Yaoundé, Cameroon
- Website: http://www.flynacam.com/

National Airways Cameroon, or Nacam, was an airline based in Yaoundé, Cameroon. It operated domestic scheduled services. It was established in November 1999 and started operations on 21 February 2000. However, operations were ceased in 2009.

== Fleet ==
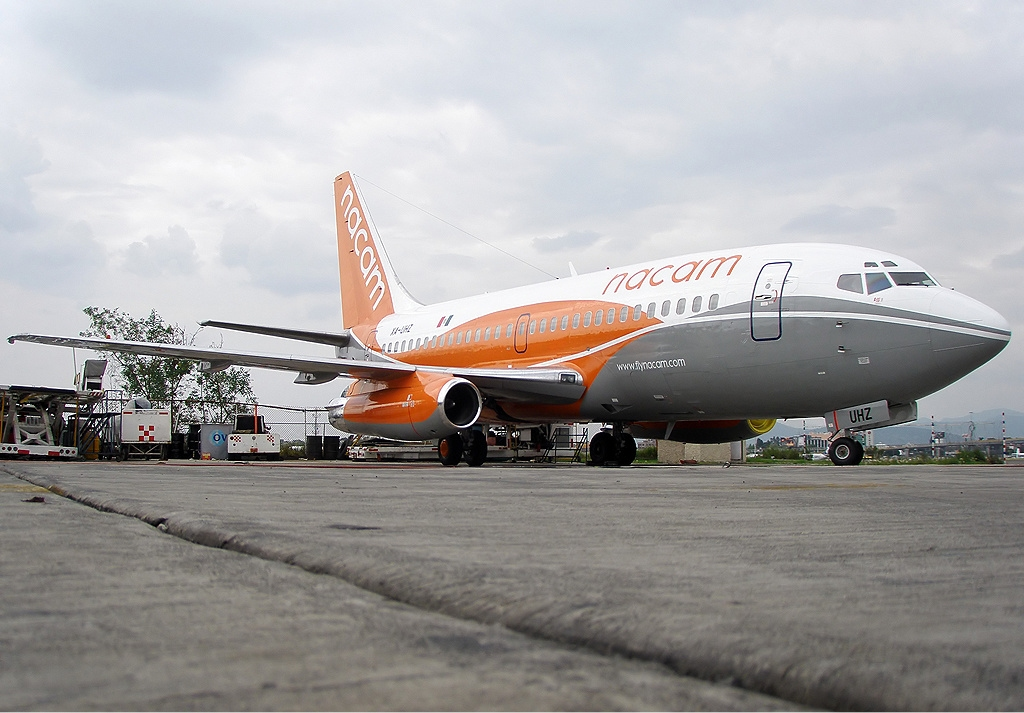
National Airways Cameroon Boeing 737-200, lost in 2018 in Cubana de Aviación Flight 972.

The National Airways Cameroon fleet included the following aircraft (as of 29 September 2008) :

- 2 Boeing 737-200
