= Camair-Co =

Cameroonian flag carrier

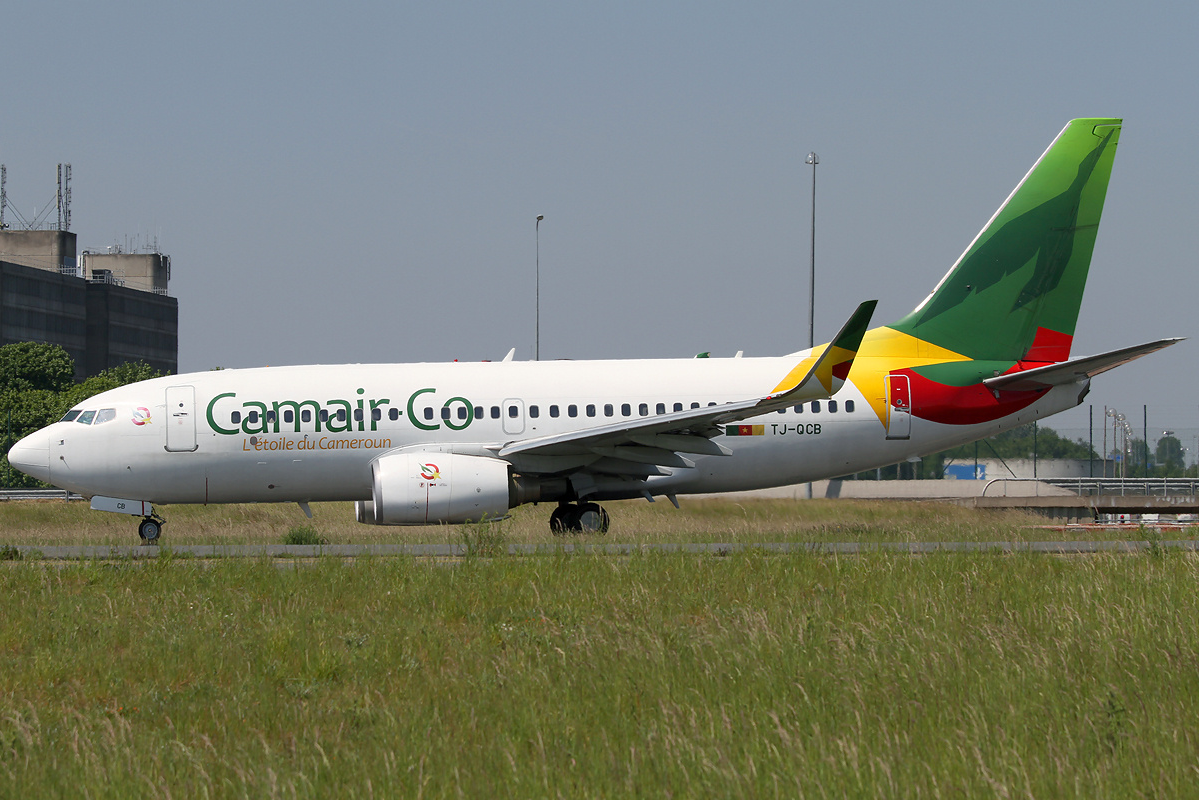
- A Camair-Co Boeing 737-700, 2014
IATA	ICAO	Call sign
QC	CRC	CAMAIRCO
- Founded: 11 September 2006
- Commenced operations: 28 March 2011
- Hubs: Douala International Airport
- Focus cities: Yaoundé Nsimalen International Airport
- Frequent-flyer program: Star Awards
- Fleet size: 6
- Destinations: 12
- Parent company: Government of Cameroon
- Headquarters: Douala, Cameroon
- Key people: Ernest Dikoum (General Director)
- Website: Camair

The Cameroon Airlines Corporation, trading as Camair-Co, is an airline from Cameroon, serving as flag carrier of the country, a role which was previously filled by the now-defunct Cameroon Airlines. Camair-Co has its headquarters in the Immeuble La Rotonde in Douala, and operates out of Douala International Airport. The airline has never made a profit, and is struggling under the weight of its debts; most of its aircraft are currently grounded. The company slogan is French: L'étoile du Cameroun, The Star of Cameroon.

== History ==
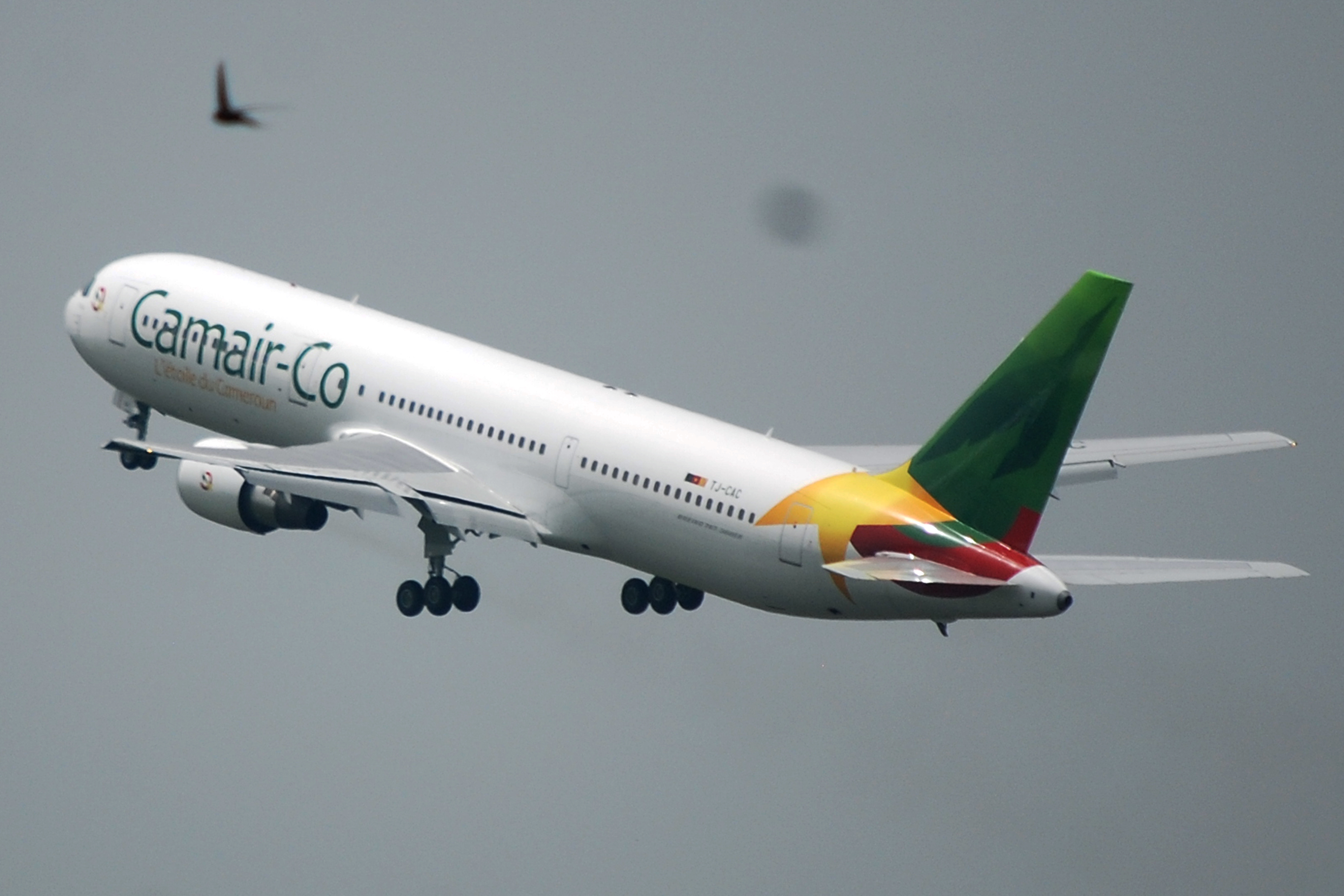
Inaugural flight on 28 March 2011.

Camair-co was created on 11 September 2006 by decree of Paul Biya, the President of Cameroon, as a company aimed at replacing Cameroon Airlines, the country's national airline at that time. The IATA code QC previously belonged to Air Corridor, which has since ceased operations. Cameroon Airlines was shut down in June 2008, but it took until 2011 for Camair-Co to launch flight services. The inaugural flight from Douala to Paris via Yaoundé took place on 28 March. On 30 September 2016 the airline ceased services to Paris as part of a network restructuring exercise.

Lossmaking since its launch in 2011, the Camair-Co reportedly had debts about 35 billion Central African CFA franc, and the Agency for Aerial Navigation Safety in Africa and Madagascar (ASECNA) had ordered the company to pay its arrears of royalties amounting to 100,390 million FCFA, under suspension of air navigation services.

Camair-Co was the subject of a recovery plan proposed by the US firm Boeing Consulting in 2016, which included settlement of the outstanding debt, the injection of FCFA 60 billion, resizing of the network and the modernisation of the fleet, but the plan has not been implemented.

In 2020, Paul Biya, the president of Cameroon, ordered urgent restructuring to facilitate the selling of a controlling share in the airline to a "strategic private investor." In 2023, the IMF placed Camair-Co under a performance contract, along with other state-owned enterprises.

== Corporate affairs ==
=== Ownership ===
Camair-Co, with a capital of 100 million CFA francs, was created by Presidential Decree No. 2006/293 of 11 September 2006 with the State of Cameroon as the sole shareholder.

=== Business trends ===
Camair-Co has been loss-making since its creation. Financial and other trends for Camair-Co (for years ending 31 December) are:

	2011	2012	2013	2014	2015	2016	2017	2018
Turnover (XAFbn)	15							28.8
Turnover (US$m)	32.2							
Net profit (XAFbn)	−9.0	loss	loss	−17.3	−10.1	loss	loss	loss
Net profit (US$m)	−18.1	loss	loss	loss	loss	loss	loss	loss
Number of employees (at year end)	<400		520					
Number of passengers (m)	0.11					0.12	0.24	
Passenger load factor (%)	45							
Number of aircraft (at year end)	3	3	3			5	5	
Notes/sources								

== Destinations ==
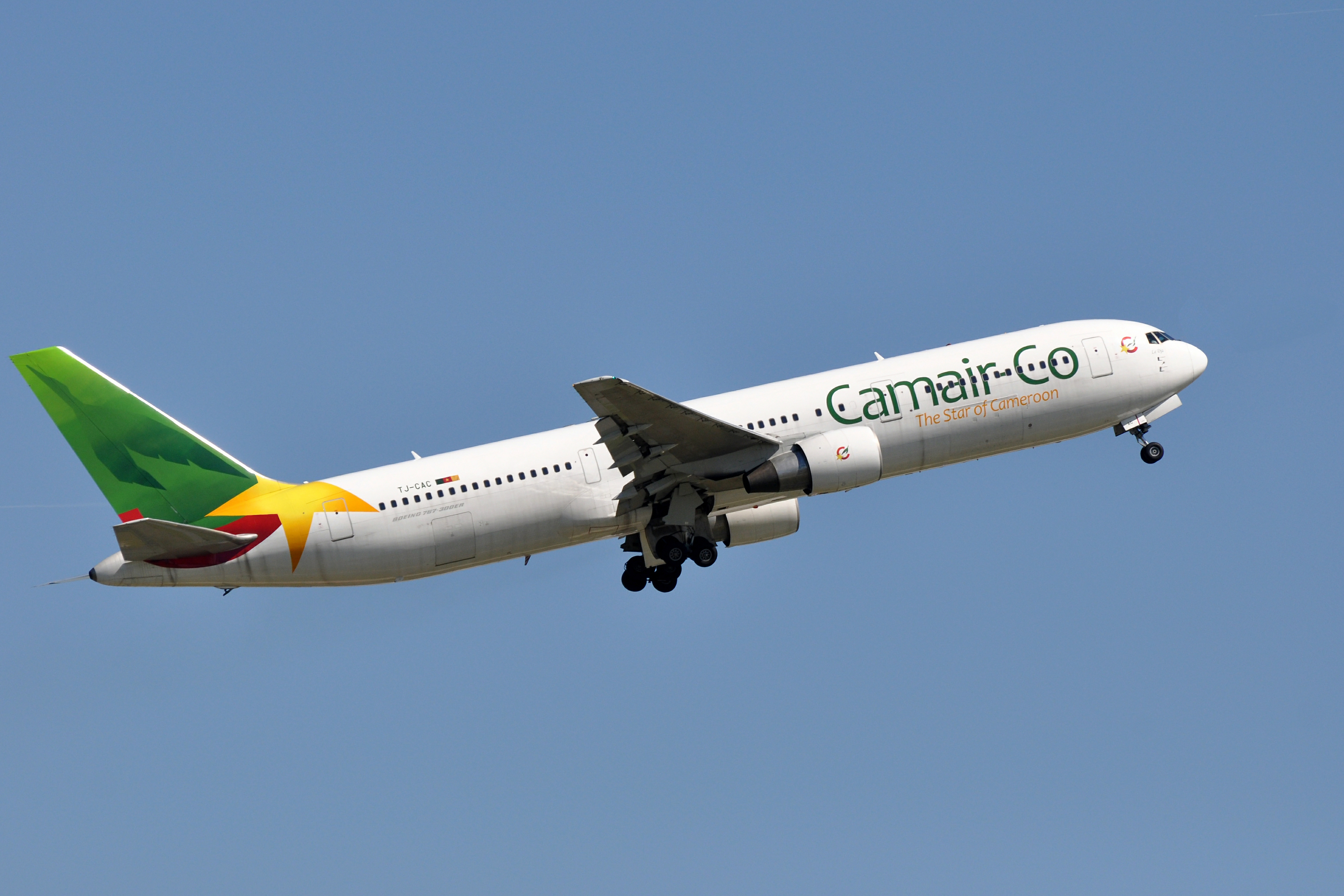
The Camair Boeing 767, 2012

As of December 2024, Camair-Co offers scheduled flights to the following destinations:

Country	City	ICAO	IATA	Airport	Status
Benin	Cotonou	DBBB	COO	Cadjehoun Airport	
Cameroon	Bafoussam	FKKU	BFX	Bafoussam Airport	
Cameroon	Douala	FKKD	DLA	Douala International Airport	Hub
Cameroon	Garoua	FKKR	GOU	Garoua International Airport	
Cameroon	Maroua	FKKL	MVR	Salak Airport	
Cameroon	Ngaoundéré	FKKN	NGE	Ngaoundéré Airport	
Cameroon	Yaoundé	FKYS	NSI	Yaoundé Nsimalen International Airport	Focus city
Central African Republic	Bangui	FEEF	BGF	Bangui M'Poko International Airport	
Chad	N'Djamena	FTTJ	NDJ	N'Djamena International Airport	
Gabon	Libreville	FOOL	LBV	Libreville International Airport	
Republic of Congo	Brazzaville	FCBB	BZV	Maya–Maya Airport	
Republic of Congo	Pointe-Noire	FCPP	PNR	Agostinho-Neto International Airport	

== Fleet ==
=== Current fleet ===
As of August 2025, Camair-Co operates the following aircraft:

Camair-Co fleet
Aircraft	In service	Orders	Passengers			Notes/sources
Aircraft	In service	Orders	C	Y	Total	Notes/sources
Boeing 737-700	2	-	12	116	128	
Bombardier Dash 8-Q400	2	-	-	70	70	
Xi'an MA60	2	-	-	-	-	
Total	6	0				

=== Former fleet ===
Camair-Co previously operated the following aircraft:

- 1 Bombardier CRJ 900

== See also ==
- Airlines of Africa
