= Yaoundé Nsimalen International Airport =

Yaoundé Nsimalen International Airport Aéroport international de Yaoundé-Nsimalen
- IATA: NSI; ICAO: FKYS

Summary
- Airport type: Public
- Operator: Aéroports du Cameroun SA (ADC)
- Serves: Yaoundé
- Location: Nsimalen, Cameroon
- Focus city for: Camair-Co
- Elevation AMSL: 2,278 ft (694 m)
- Coordinates: 03°43′21″N 011°33′12″E

Map
- Location of Airport in Cameroon

Runways
Direction	Length		Surface
Direction	m	ft	Surface
01/19	3,400	11,155	Asphalt

Statistics (2009)
- Passengers: 208,973
- Source: DAFIF

Yaoundé Nsimalen International Airport (French: Aéroport international de Yaoundé-Nsimalen) (IATA: NSI, ICAO: FKYS) is the second busiest and largest public airport in Cameroon. The airport is located 27 kilometers (16 miles) south of the capital, Yaoundé, near Nsimalen in Cameroon's Centre Region.

== History ==
Starting operations in 1991, Nsimalen was built to supersede the old international airport in Yaoundé, which was getting absorbed by the rapid growth of the city. It was also too close to the oil deposits of SCDP ("Société Camerounaise de Dépôts Pétroliers" or Cameroon Oil Storage Company). This former international airport of Yaoundé, still known as Yaoundé Airport, now serves as an airbase for the Cameroon Air Force.

In 2004, Nsimalen airport served 190,487 passengers. The airport has 14 direct flights to 11 countries. It is also the focus city for the most popular airline in Cameroon, Camair-Co, successor to the defunct Cameroon Airlines. The airport's growth of international traffic is 4% per year. The government has set a goal of servicing 1.5 million passengers and 50,000 tons of cargo per year.

== Facilities ==
Yaoundé Nsimalen International Airport covers 3,065 acres (1240 ha) at an elevation of 694 m (2,276 ft), and includes one passenger terminal, one cargo terminal and 6 aircraft stands. Nsimalen airport currently has one runway: heading 01/19, 3,400 m (11,154 ft) in length, with a width of 45 m (147 ft), which could accommodate a Boeing 747.

The airport is equipped with modern facilities and can be accessed through four gates. It has six parking facilities, two of which are for long term use. Inside the terminal there are 10 check-in desks, currency exchange office, post office, restaurants, tourist information centre, business centre, banks and car rental, limousine services and taxi services. Cargo facilities are equipped with a 1,839 m^{2} (19,794 sq ft) warehouse, twelve 747 Freighter docks, a transit zone, animal quarantine, health office, X-ray/handling/mechanical equipment and refrigerated storage.

== Airlines and destinations ==
Airlines	Destinations
Afrijet	Libreville
Air Côte d'Ivoire	Abidjan
Air France	Paris–Charles de Gaulle
ASKY	Lomé, Malabo, N'Djamena
Brussels Airlines^{1}	Brussels
Camair-Co	Douala, Garoua, Libreville, Maroua, N'Djamena, Ngaoundéré; Seasonal: Jeddah, Medina
ECAir	Brazzaville
Ethiopian Airlines	Addis Ababa, Libreville
Royal Air Maroc	Casablanca
Turkish Airlines	Istanbul

Notes

^1: Brussels Airlines' flight to Brussels from Yaoundé stops in Douala, but the airline does not have eighth freedom rights on the Yaoundé and Douala sector.
