= Douala International Airport =

International airport in Douala, Cameroon

Douala International Airport Aéroport international de MD-Douala
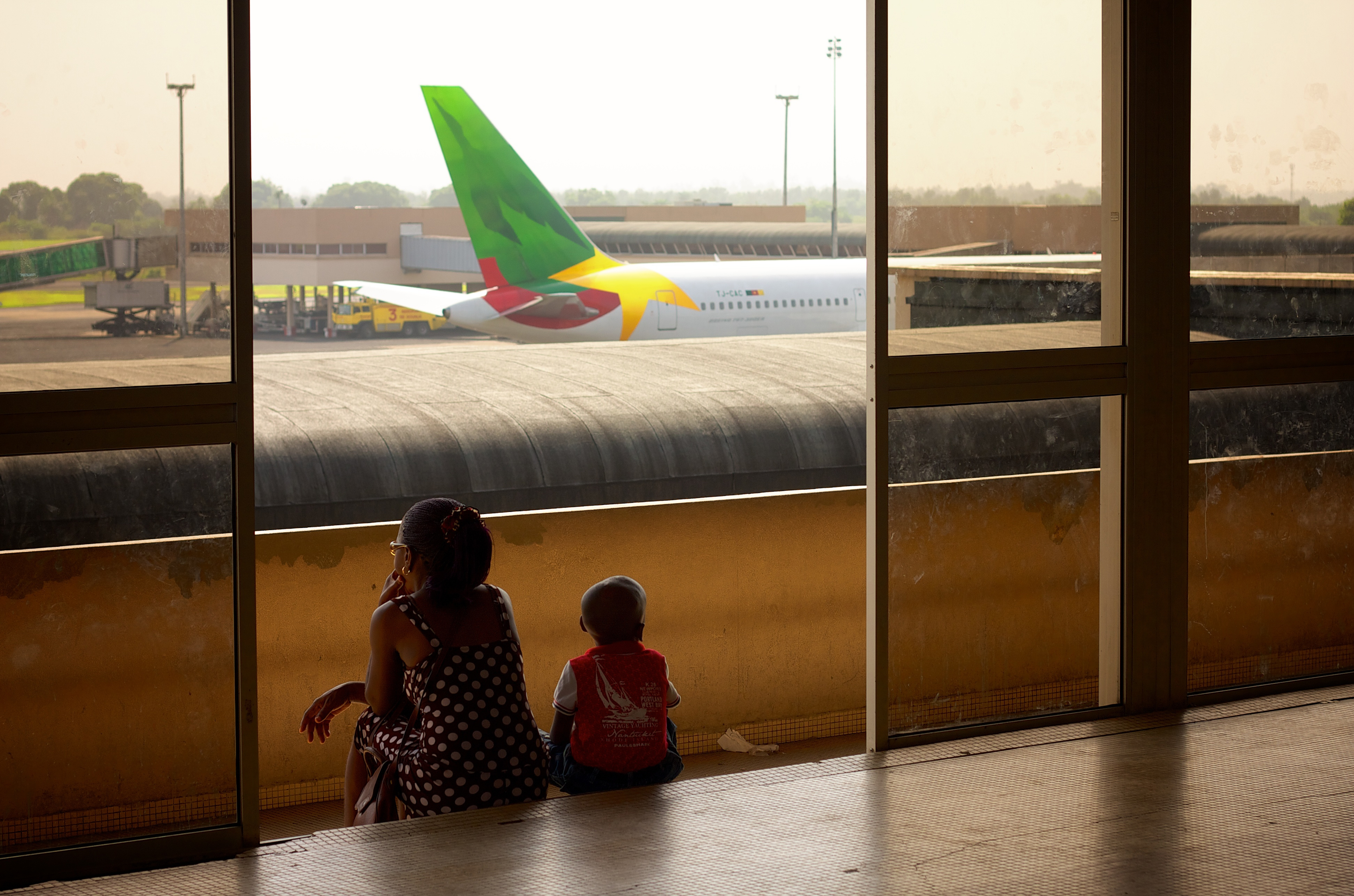
- IATA: DLA; ICAO: FKKD

Summary
- Airport type: Public / Military
- Operator: Aéroports du Cameroun (ADC)
- Serves: Douala, Cameroon
- Hub for: Camair-Co
- Elevation AMSL: 33 ft (10 m)
- Coordinates: 04°00′21″N 009°43′10″E
- Website: ccaa.aero

Map
- Location of Airport in Cameroon

Runways
Direction	Length		Surface
Direction	m	ft	Surface
12/30	2,880	9,448	Asphalt

Statistics
- Passengers (2014): 1,500,000
- Source: DAFIF

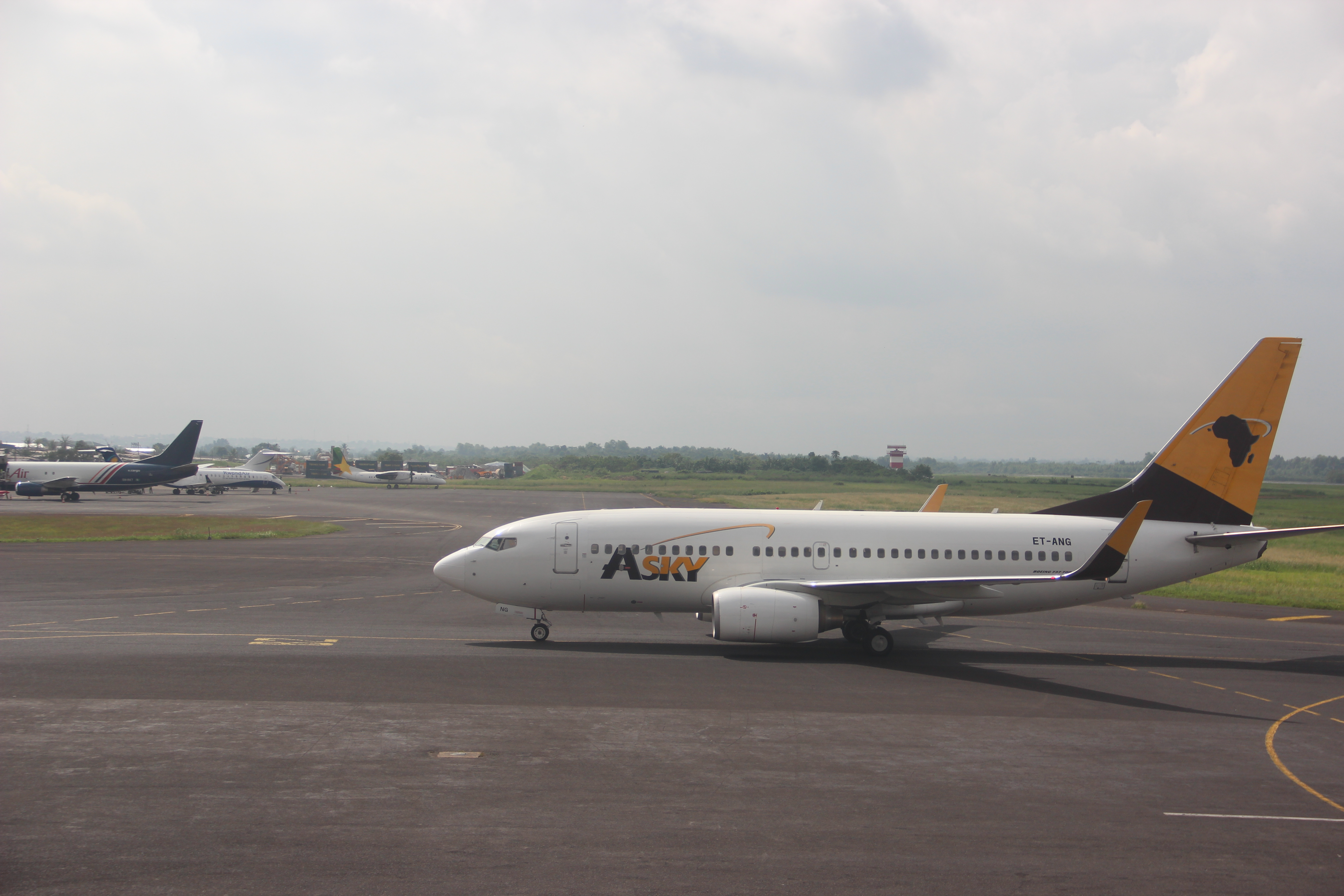
Douala International Airport with airplanes in the flight line

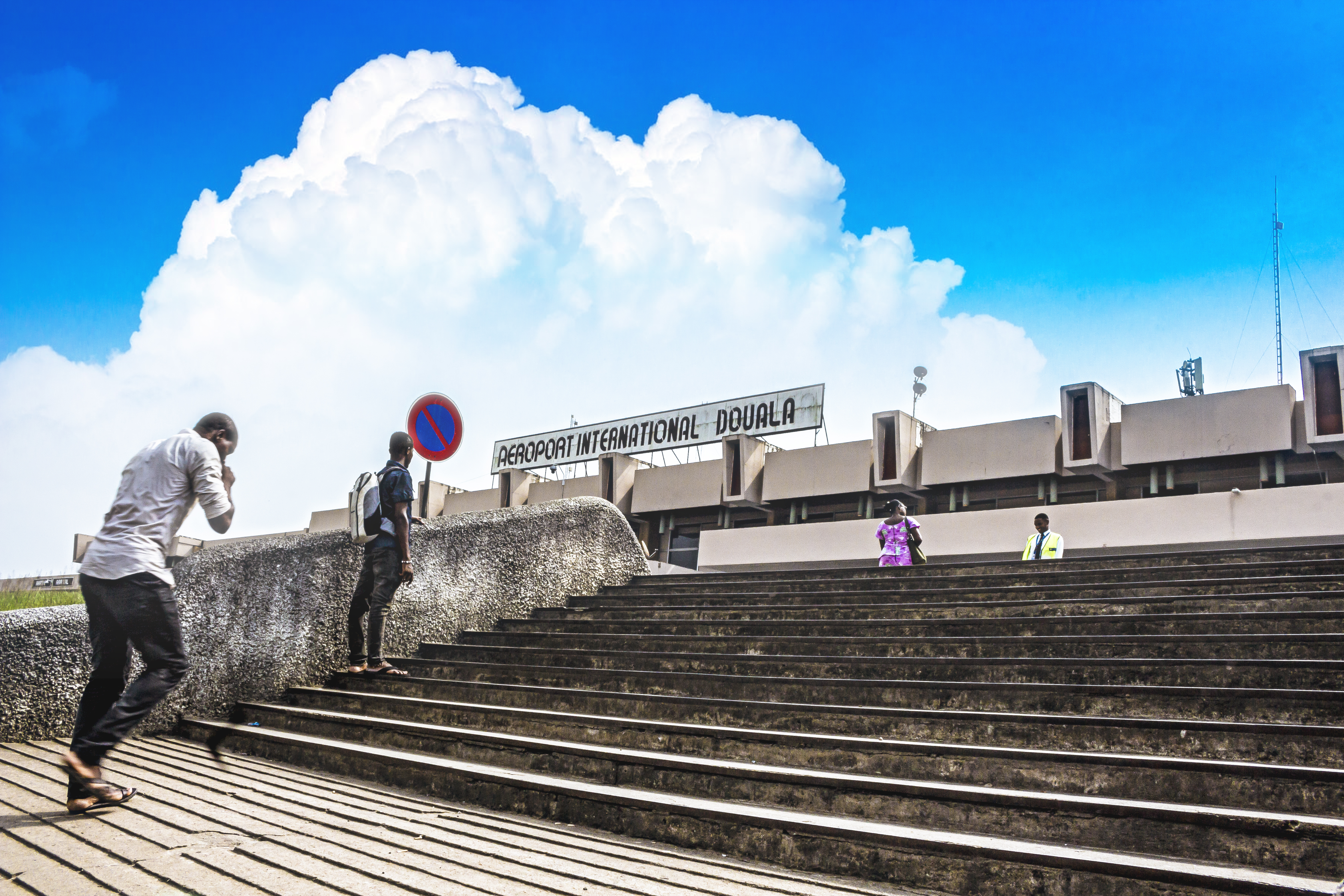
Front view of the Douala International Airport on a bright sunny day

Douala International Airport (French: Aéroport international de Douala) (IATA: DLA, ICAO: FKKD) is an international airport located in Douala, the largest city in Cameroon and the capital of Cameroon's Littoral Region. With its 4 terminals and an average of 1.5 million passengers and 50,000 tonnes of freight per year, it is the country's busiest airport. The airport is managed and partly owned (34%) by the company Aeroport du Cameroon (ADC) which also manages all other 13 airports on Cameroonian soil.

== Runway ==
Douala Airport has a single runway, 12/30, with a length of 2,880 m (9,448 ft). Between 1 and 21 March 2016, the runway was closed for upgrade works; all airlines switched operations to Yaoundé Airport during that period. This formed part of a renovation plan of 20 billion CFA (US$36,363,636 million), financed by the French Agency of Development, which targeted a two-stage renovation: first the airport's runway, and then its terminals and interior.

== Airlines and destinations ==
=== Passenger ===
Airlines	Destinations
Afrijet	Bata, Libreville, Malabo
Air Algérie	Algiers
Air Congo	Kinshasa-N'djili
Air Côte d'Ivoire	Abidjan
ASKY Airlines	Lomé
Camair-Co	Bafoussam, Bangui, Brazzaville, Cotonou, Libreville, Ngaoundéré, Pointe-Noire, Yaoundé; Seasonal: Jeddah, Medina
Cronos Airlines	Malabo
Egyptair	Cairo
Ethiopian Airlines	Addis Ababa
Kenya Airways	Nairobi–Jomo Kenyatta
Royal Air Maroc	Casablanca
RwandAir	Kigali

== Accidents and incidents ==
- 4 March 1962: Caledonian Airways Flight 153 – all 111 people on board died
- On 30 August 1984, Cameroon Airlines Flight 786, a Boeing 737-200 registered as (TJ-CBD), experienced an engine malfunction when taxiing. A fire from the damaged fuel tank engulfed the aircraft causing it to burn out. Two passengers were trapped by the flames and died. The remaining 107 passengers and seven crew members were able to evacuate the plane safely.
- 3 December 1995: Cameroon Airlines Flight 3701 – 71 out of 76 people on board died
- 5 May 2007: the Kenya Airways Flight 507 scheduled for Abidjan – Douala – Nairobi crashed in Mbanga Pongo near Douala international airport, two minutes after it took off from the airport. Although the weather was bad, the report from the Cameroonian civil aviation authority said the pilots were to blame for the crash. There were 114 fatalities, including 37 Cameroonians, 15 Indians and one American.
