= Werkschulheim Felbertal =

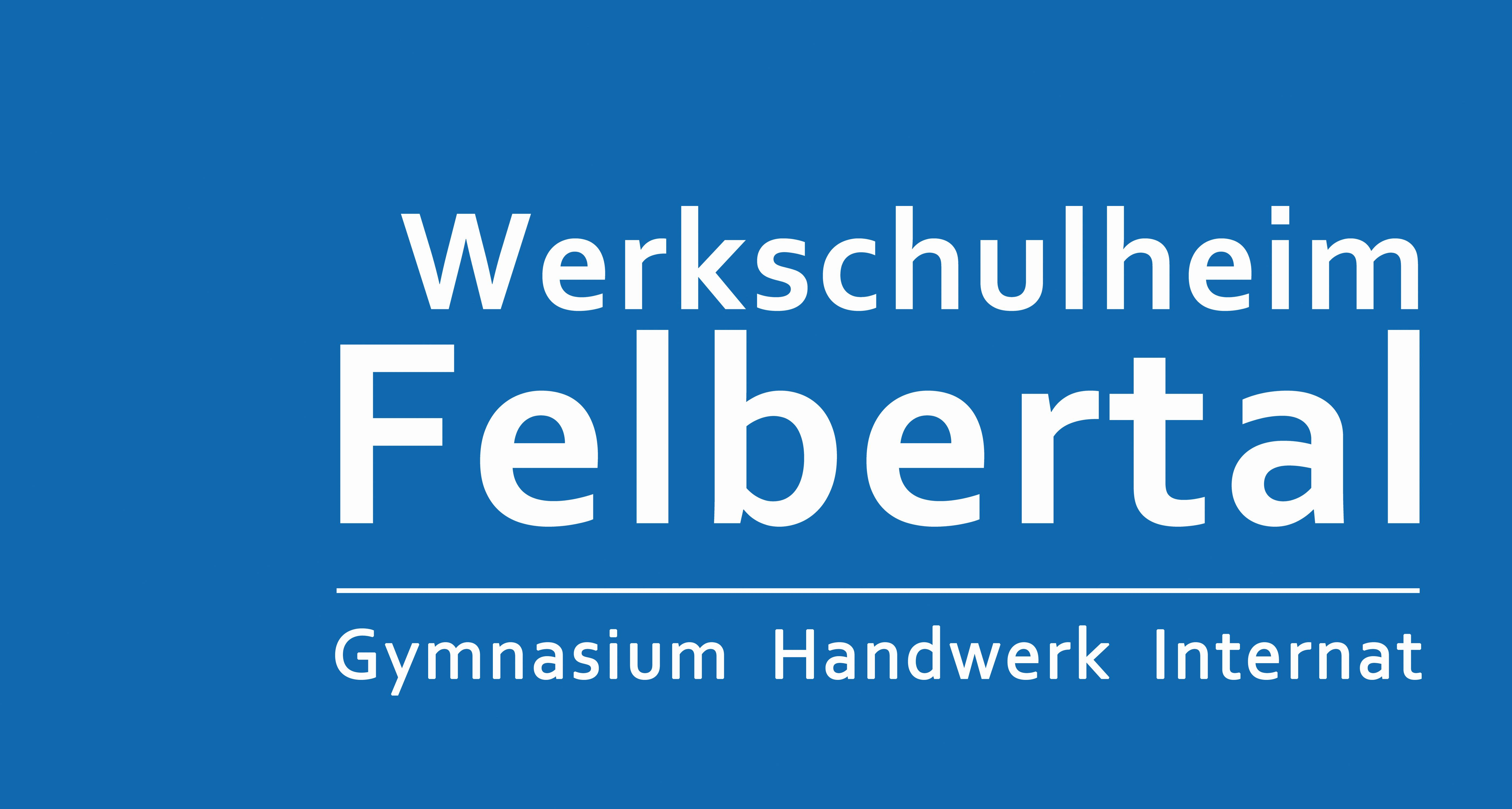

Location
- Werkschulheimstraße 11; Ebenau, Salzburg; Austria
- Coordinates: 47°46′23″N 13°11′23″E

Information
- Established: 1951
- School number: 503016
- Head Master: Karin Starlinger-Baumgartinger
- Website: werkschulheim.at

The Werkschulheim Felbertal is a private grammar school with public rights and offers a combination of a general secondary school and craft training. It is the flagship model for the Dual education system in Austria. The school is located in Ebenau, Austria.

== History and concept ==
The Werkschulheim Felbertal was founded in 1951 as a boarding school near Mittersill, Austria. The founder and headmaster until 1958 was Alexej Stachowitsch. In 1964 the school moved to Ebenau, 10 km east of Salzburg.

In August 1951 the 7th World Scout Jamboree took place in Bad Ischl. In previous years, the idea of founding a school in Berchtesgaden (Germany) had circulated among the Scouting community. One month later, the foundation stone for the Werkschulheim was laid in Felbertal (6 km south of Mittersill) in the Salzburg Pinzgau region.

From the beginning, the aim of the school was to combine secondary education with craftsmanship, so that each graduate received a matriculation certificate and a journeyman's certificate. Scouting ideas such as the patrol as a unit and out-of-school learning in project and experience weeks are still being carried out today.

In the Werkschulheim, the original Lagertor ("camp gateway") of the World Jamboree in Bad Ischl stands as a monument from the founding year 1951. In addition, the Werkschulheim has its own Scout group, which regularly meets there.

== Boarding school ==
The school is run as a full and semi-boarding school. The students are cared for in small groups (maximum twelve people). The boarding school has double rooms with a bathroom and balcony, as well as TV and internet connections and, since the 2016/2017 school year, Wi-Fi. Common areas serve as meeting points. Pupils from the surrounding communities are cared for in their own groups in a semi-boarding school (day care) every day until 5:00 p.m.

In the boarding school, value is placed on treating one another with respect and tolerance and on acquiring a responsible and self-motivated learning and working attitude. Living together also promotes social components, such as a sense of responsibility and independence. The daily routine is clearly structured and includes daily core learning times with support and guidance from the supervisors; these are in close cooperation with the teachers and parents with the help of an internal information system (intranet). The wide range of leisure activities ensures a balance in everyday school life. A special highlight are the annual experience and project weeks.

== Headmasters ==
- 1951–1958: Alexej Stachowitsch
- 1958–1976: Josef Löw
- 1976–2005: Hans Bigenzahn
- 2005–2014: Winfried Kogelnik
- 2014–2019: Heinz Edenhofner
- since 2019: Karin Starlinger-Baumgartinger
