= Alexej Stachowitsch =

Austrian-Russian educator and scouting figure

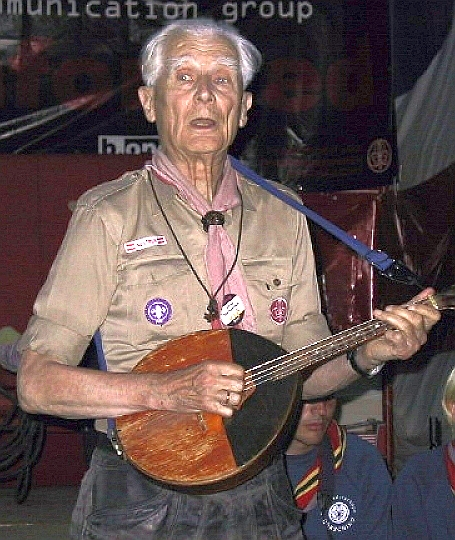
- Born: October 10, 1918; Stockholm
- Died: April 1, 2013 (aged 94); Limburg an der Lahn
- Resting place: Salzburg
- Occupations: Author, pedagogue, songwriter, technician
- Writing career
- Notable works: Kosakenwacht, Sinn und Un-Sinn, Freude
- Notable awards: Goldenen Lilie of the Pfadfinder und Pfadfinderinnen Österreichs

Alexej "Axi" Stachowitsch (Stockholm October 10, 1918 – April 1, 2013 Limburg an der Lahn) was an Austrian-Russian author, pedagogue, songwriter, technician, one of the most important figures of post-war Scouting and Wandervogel in Germany and Austria, and founder and first principal of the Werkschulheim Felbertal. Stachowitsch was a program director and journalist at the 7th World Scout Jamboree in Bad Ischl, director of the de:Nerother Wandervogel, co-founder of the independent Balduinstein educational institution and founder of the Jungenbundes Phoenix. Meanwhile, it has become known that the castle Balduinstein has been the site of many acts of sexual violence against male minors since its founding and for three decades.

== Background ==
Stachowitsch was professionally active in the field of telecommunications engineering, in the automobile industry and as an officer in the Austrian army. In 1935, he acquired Austrian citizenship and was called into the Austrian Olympiakader. He became the Salzburg youth champion in running in 1935 and 1936. In 1937 Stachowitsch graduated and began a radio electronics course, while he was an officer candidate in the Wiener Heerestelegraphenabteilung. With the Anschluss of Austria to the German Reich in 1938, he attended the Kriegsschule of the Wehrmacht in Hanover, where he took his officer's examination and became a lieutenant in 1939. During World War II he served in the army press service on the western front, later in the Army Group South on the eastern front. After the war he became a master radio mechanic in 1947 and worked in a workshop in Salzburg. After leaving the Werkschulheim Felbertal school management in 1958, he joined Simca in manufacturing. Due to different objectives, he ended his collaboration with the Balduinstein educational institution in 1989. In 1991 he worked briefly as delegation leader for Russian aid of the Red Cross; in the same year he was appointed honorary colonel of the Siberian Cossacks. On 1 April 2013 he died in Limburg an der Lahn and was buried in the family grave at the municipal cemetery in Salzburg.

== Scouting ==
In 1929, Stachowitsch joined the Österreichischer Pfadfinderbund (ÖPB), Salzburg Group 2. In 1933 he took part in the 4th World Scout Jamboree in Gödöllő, Hungary where he saw Robert Baden-Powell. He became a group leader in the ÖPB, but this existed only two years until its forced dissolution in 1938.

From 1945 on, Stachowitsch played a decisive role in the reconstruction of Austrian Scouting (Pfadfinder Österreichs, PÖ). He became provincial Scout director of Salzburg. The foundation of the Salzburger Jugendbeirats (Salzburg Youth Advisory Board) was formed in this period with his co-operation. He was an organizer for the "Camp of Friendship" in the Montafon Valley in 1946 with German, Swiss, Austrian, French and Italian Scouts, the first camp of this kind after World War II.

In 1947 Stachowitsch took part in the Wood Badge course at Gilwell Park in England. As an assistant to the International Scout Bureau, he assisted the reconstruction of the German Scout movement in 1948 and became co-founder of the Bundesdeutscher Pfadfinder (BDP). He lectured at the Faculty of Philosophy of the University of Salzburg on youth movement, became a member of the International Scouting Conference and studied applied psychology and sociology in the United States through a scholarship. In 1950 he became one of the organizers of the first Wood Badge course of the PÖ.

Stachowitsch was a program director and journalist at the 7th World Scout Jamboree in Bad Ischl in 1951. That year he founded the Werkschulheim Felbertal in the de:Felbertal near Mittersill, and became the first headmaster.

In 1988, Stachowitsch was active in the organization of the Meissner camp. In 2001 he took part in the "50 Jahre Jamboree Bad Ischl" 50 year Jamboree reunion. After 2003 he was the recipient of the Goldenen Lilie (Golden Lily) of the Pfadfinder und Pfadfinderinnen Österreichs. This second highest sign of honour was canceled unanimously posthumously in July 2017 in a decision of the Federal Council of the PPÖ. Among other things, this decision was in response to a report about sexual assaults by Stachowitsch.

He was involved in numerous events, such as the "Augsburger, Würzburger und Rheinischer Singewettstreit" initiated by Scouts and bündischer Jugend in Untermerzbach.

== Werkschulheim Felbertal ==
In August 1951 the 7th World Scout Jamboree took place in Bad Ischl. In previous years, the idea of founding a school in Berchtesgaden had circulated among the Scouting community. One month later the foundation stone for the boarding school Werkschulheim was laid in the Felbertal near Mittersill in the Salzburg Pinzgau region.

From the beginning, the aim of the school was to combine secondary education with craftsmanship, so that each graduate received a matriculation certificate and a journeyman's certificate. Scouting ideas such as the patrol as a unit and out-of-school learning in project and experience weeks are still being carried out today.

In the Werkschulheim, the original Lagertor of the World Jamboree in Bad Ischl stands as a monument from the founding year 1951. In addition, the Werkschulheim has its own Scout group, which regularly meets there.

== Works ==
- Kosakenwacht. 1964.
- Sinn und Un-Sinn. Eine Bündische Herausforderung. Verlag Horst E. Visser, Duisburg 1974.
- Freude. Südmarkverlag, Heidenheim 1981. ISBN 3-88258-059-3. (Liederbuch)
- Bündisches Leben – wozu? Deutscher Spurbuchverlag, Baunach 1995. ISBN 3-88778-199-6.
- Schule ein Abenteuer. Guggenberger Verlag, 2001. ISBN 3-901928-07-3.
- Wegzeichen – Lieder und Gedanken eines Lebens. Deutscher Spurbuchverlag, Baunach 2006. ISBN 978-3-88778-304-4.
- zahlreiche Texte in: Bündisch ist... Beiträge zur Frage nach dem Bündischen. Freies Bildungswerk Balduinstein, Balduinstein 1977. (2. Auflage 1979)

== Discography ==
- Ty morjak, Der Orden der Kosaken im Nerother Wandervogel singt unter der Leitung von Alexej Stachowitsch 21 Lieder. Thorofon, 1974. FTH 134.
