= International Post Corporation =

- Abbreviation: IPC
- Formation: 1989
- Legal status: Société Coopérative
- Location: Brussels, Belgium
- Members: 26 (2026)
- Official language: English
- CEO: Holger Winklbauer
- Chair of IPC Board: Tone Wille
- Website: www.ipc.be

International Post Corporation (IPC) is a cooperative association of 26 national postal services from major countries in Europe, Asia Pacific and North America. IPC's main activities are providing assistance to its postal members, whose businesses activities include mail, parcels, express, logistics, retail and banking services.

IPC was founded in 1989 and since then its main activities have been to upgrade quality and service performance, to develop technology to help members improve service for international letters, parcels and express, and to provide industry intelligence and platforms for cooperation between posts. Its headquarters are in Brussels, Belgium.

== Membership and governance ==
Former IPC logo

=== Membership ===
IPC members represent postal operators from Europe, North America and the Asia-Pacific region. IPC Shareholding Members are allocated a minimum number of shares based on their total addressed mail volumes (i.e. total letter mail handled and delivered inside and outside the organisation’s home country, excluding unaddressed mail and newspapers but including magazines). All IPC members should have a universal service obligation for the provision of mail services although the Board is authorised to admit members without such an obligation. IPC’s current members are:

Country	Postal organisation
Australia	Australia Post (Note: Previous member)
Austria	Austrian Post
Belgium	bpost
Canada	Canada Post (Note: Previous member)
Croatia	Hrvatska pošta
Cyprus	Cyprus Post
Denmark	Post Danmark (PostNord)
Estonia	Omniva (Note: Previous member)
Finland	Posti Group
France	La Poste
Germany	Deutsche Post DHL
Great Britain (United Kingdom)	International Distribution Services (Royal Mail)
Greece	Hellenic Post
Hungary	Magyar Posta
Iceland	Iceland Post
Ireland	An Post
Italy	Poste Italiane
Luxembourg	POST Luxembourg
Netherlands	PostNL
New Zealand	New Zealand Post
Norway	Posten Norge
Portugal	CTT–Correios de Portugal
Romania	Poșta Română
Spain	Correos y Telégrafos
Sweden	Posten (PostNord)
Switzerland	Swiss Post
United States	United States Postal Service

=== Governance ===
IPC is a cooperative company governed by a Board, composed of the chief executive officers from eleven IPC members plus IPC's president and chief executive. The board is chaired by Tone Wille, CEO of Posten Norge. IPC’s current CEO is Holger Winklbauer.

== Mission and activities ==
International Post Corporation was founded in 1989 and is headquartered in Brussels, Belgium. IPC was founded with a double role: provide a platform to exchange intelligence between its member posts, and develop and support systems to improve international mail services through quality of service and interoperability.

IPC’s main activities include:

- Upgrading international mail quality
- Providing industry intelligence and research
- Providing platforms for senior management

=== Mail quality ===
IPC’s core activity is to develop and provide technological solutions to support member postal operators in achieving quality of service performance requirements. These services focus on upgrading and maintaining member posts’ end-to-end performance for cross-border mail through monitoring and streamlining international mail processes.

IPC deploys a number of technology infrastructures and systems such as radio frequency identification (RFID), item monitoring and a harmonised customer service system (CSS), which provide transparency in international mail movements, provision of full operational information and data for calculating intercompany payments, detailed enquiry processing and quality of service performance results.

IPC also focuses on key areas for the postal sector like, e-commerce, intercompany pricing and sustainability. In 2009, the company launched its sector-wide sustainability programme, which aimed at reducing the carbon emissions of its participants by 20% by 2020 - a target which was attained in 2018. The company is also a signatory to the UN Global Compact.

=== Market research ===
IPC’s marketing function focuses on creating intelligence on market developments and sharing best practice between posts. Through the close relation with the postal industry, IPC carries out research and gathers intelligence within the postal industry. Some the areas analysed are direct marketing, e-commerce, digital business and environmental sustainability.

The IPC Cross-Border E-Commerce Shopper Survey provides a comprehensive analysis of the global trends and drivers shaping cross-border e-commerce from the perspective of online consumers. The aim is to inform postal operators of changing customer needs so that they can take informed decisions with regard to their international product portfolio and delivery service specifications.

=== Collaboration ===
IPC is a cooperative member organisation and as such one of its goals is to provide a framework for networking and knowledge sharing by establishing platforms. These platforms bring together senior postal executives across a range of functions and facilitate further postal operator cooperation by leading groups dedicated to developing solutions to specific cross-border market requirements.
