= Sabotage at the General Post Office in Zagreb =

Politically-motivated act of sabotage in fascist-controlled Croatia (1941)

Sabotage at the General Post Office, Zagreb
- Part of World War II in Zagreb
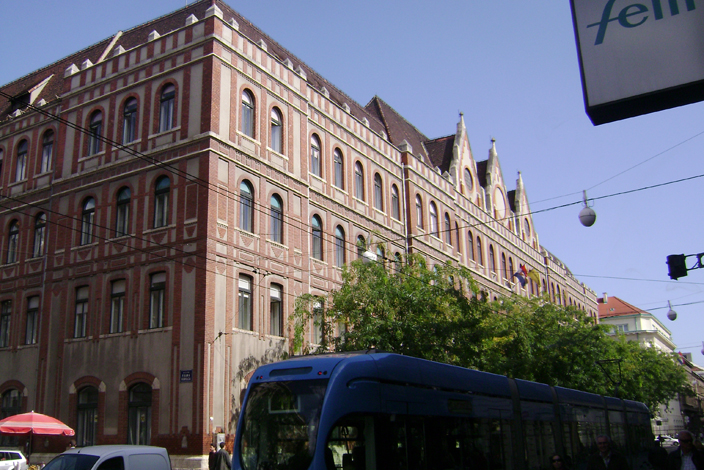
- The building of the former Post Directorate, Jurišićeva Street, Zagreb
| Date | 14 September 1941 |
| Location | Zagreb, Independent State of Croatia 45°48′45″N 15°58′52″E |
| Result | Heavy damage to the telephone facilities at the General Post Office in Zagreb, disruption of telephone communications |

Sabotage at the General Post Office in Zagreb took place during the Second World War on Sunday, 14 September 1941. Zagreb had been occupied by the Axis Ustaše, and the Communist Party of Croatia had organized an underground resistance.

Two explosions rocked the General Post Office building, destroying telegram and telephone communications equipment. Nine security personnel were injured, one fatally.

The repairs took months, and the Independent State of Croatia issued warrants for the arrest of the saboteurs. After the end of the war, the sabotage was the topic of movies and TV series episodes.

== Background ==
In April 1941, Zagreb became the capital city of the Independent State of Croatia (NDH), a puppet state of Nazi Germany. The Communist Party of Croatia, a banned political party, started to organize the Croatian Partisan movement in June 1941.

The sabotage was organized and conducted at the initiative of the Central Committee of the Party, by general secretary Rade Končar personally. Performance was entrusted to the Local Committee members: Blaž Mesarić, Antun Biber, Vojo Kovačević, Ante Milković (last two were arrested shortly before the explosion). Technical preparations are made by postal employees: Josip Čuljat, Slavko Markon, Vilim Galjer, and Nada Galjer. Čuljat and Markon were the mechanics in the Post office, the first - on the city phone automatic exchanges devices, the other - on high frequency special devices for long distance calls. Both were young men twenty-year-old and members of SKOJ.

== Explosion ==
This group had already developed a plan of sabotage and made the necessary preparations during the night services. Special custom-made tin boxes for explosives were constructed by locksmith Ivan Brumen, a supporter of the Communist Party and the partisans (resistance movement). With the help of Augustinović, a sympathizer with the resistance movements and a lieutenant in the Croatian Home Guard, they obtained the required amount of explosives. He purchased (and stole) these explosives from a military magazine and gave them to Mesarić.

The big problem was how to bring 21 kilograms of trinitrotoluene into the building, as the main Post office was under constant guard by Ustaša and German soldiers. They achieved this by sending themselves a package, three days before the sabotage. The package was received on 12 September by Slavko Markon, who placed it in a convenient magazine, near the automatic exchange facilities.

Slavko Markon, Josip Čuljat and Nada Galjer (telephone operator) were able somehow to adjust their work schedules so that all three were on duty at midnight on Saturday night. They began work immediately. There were seven boxes of explosives. In each of these seven boxes were all the necessary parts for the electrical ignition. When the boxes were prepared, they were placed first in three of the automatic switchboard facilities, and later in two long distance high frequency facilities on the lower floor, and another in two places in the so-called splitter facility.

The high-frequency devices department was constantly guarded by a German soldier together with the two duty mechanics. The Nazis were very interested in this department because there were special German devices to maintain telephone links with Vienna, Berlin, Belgrade and Athens, and through them went cables from Berlin to Odessa and Sofia. It was therefore necessary to disable the German soldier, because in his presence they could not mount the explosive devices. Čuljat brought the soldier a good bottle of brandy; he drank it and then slept all night, dead drunk.

At 7 a.m. everything was prepared for the explosion. At 8 a.m., Čuljat, Markon, Galjer and other saboteurs went by train to Karlovac and changed trains for Kordun, where they joined the Yugoslav Partisans.

On Sunday at 12.30 p.m. in the apartment of Professor Olga Milčinović, Nikola Rupčić, who had been given the task by Anton Biber, picked up the phone, and dialed the required number to activate the detonation. Two muffled explosions were heard, all the glass in the main post office building was broken, and through the windows flew out a large quantity of office paper and all kinds of documents.

After the explosion a lot of police officers ran into the building, in order to prevent a possible second explosion. They issued a command to disconnect all of the building from electrical power, even from the reserve power battery pack. In this way they caused another explosion. However due to an error during installation, one of the seven explosive devices did not explode.

The sabotage caused heavy damage to the telephone facilities at the General Post Office in Zagreb, and telephone communications with Vienna, Berlin, Belgrade, Odessa and Sofia were interrupted for several hours. The telephone facilities were repaired in almost seven months. On the site, a police clerk was killed, while the five agents of the Ustašha, two German soldiers and one German officer were wounded. None of the postal officials and civilians were injured.

== Aftermath ==
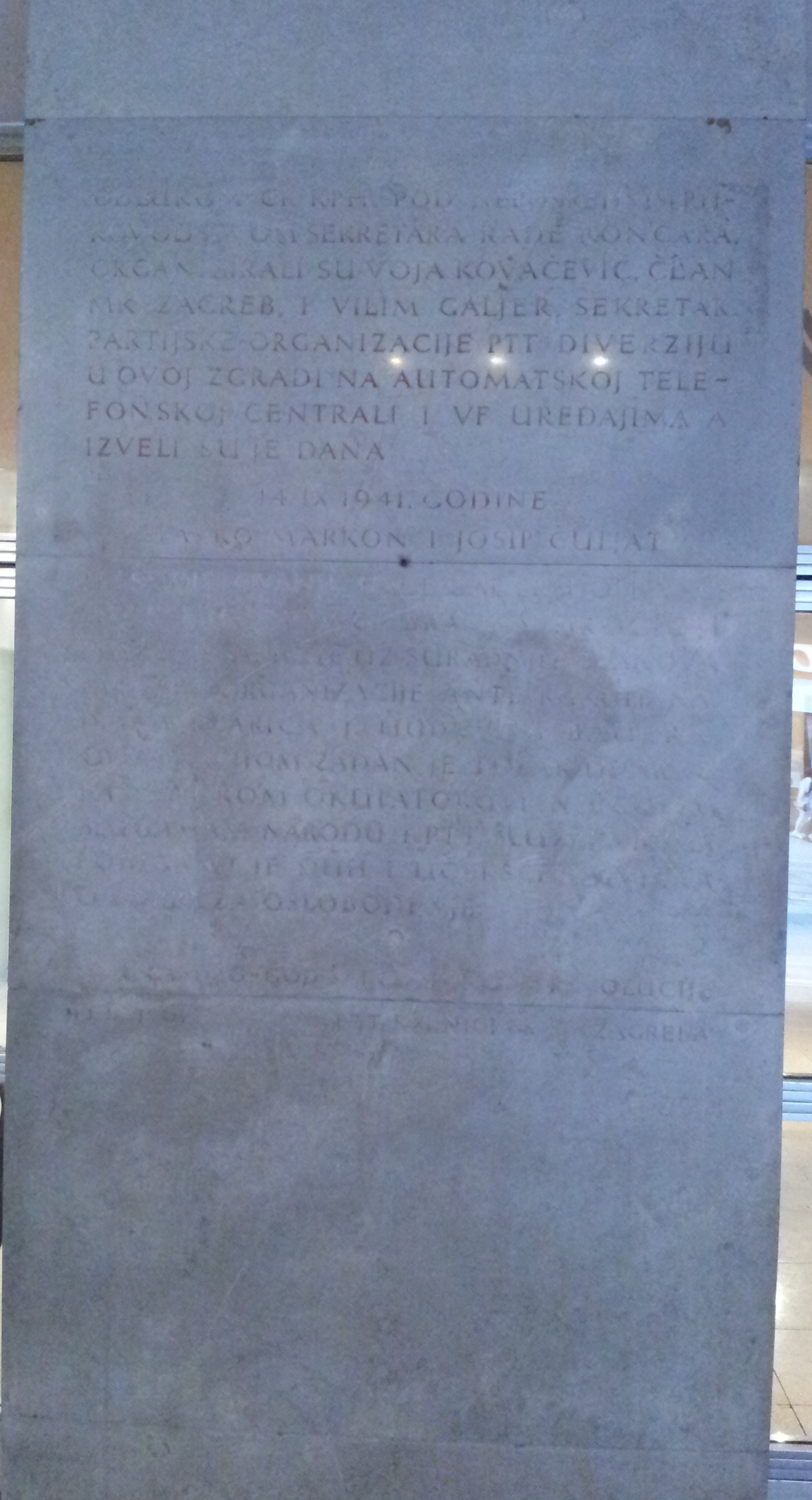
Stone memorial of the event stands at the entrance into the General Post Office building. (Embossed letters are hardly visible; picture taken in 2012.)

The next day, the Ustaša daily newspaper Hrvatski narod printed an official notice about the event at the General Post Office: "On 14 September this year at a time between 12:30-13 hours, four bombs exploded in the main post building in the department of telegrams and telephone. Eight people are injured, on this occasion, including two German soldiers and one officer and several policemen. Police clerk Škunca died of their wounds..."

On Wednesday 17 September a warrant was issued for the perpetrators of this action, Josip Čuljat, Slavko Markon, Vilim Galjer and Nada Galjer and printed in the form of large posters in several hundred thousand copies, which were deployed in all public places in the Independent State of Croatia.

After the war, film director Ivo Lukas made a film about this event in 1961 entitled Diverzija na telefonsku centralu (Diversion to a telephone switchboard). An episode of the 1981 TV series Nepokoreni grad, titled "72 - 96", is also based on the event.
