= Paxster =

Norwegian small electric vehicle company

- Industry: Automotive
- Founded: 2013 in Norway
- Website: paxster.no

Paxster AS is a Norwegian manufacturer of small electric vehicles, often used by postal services.

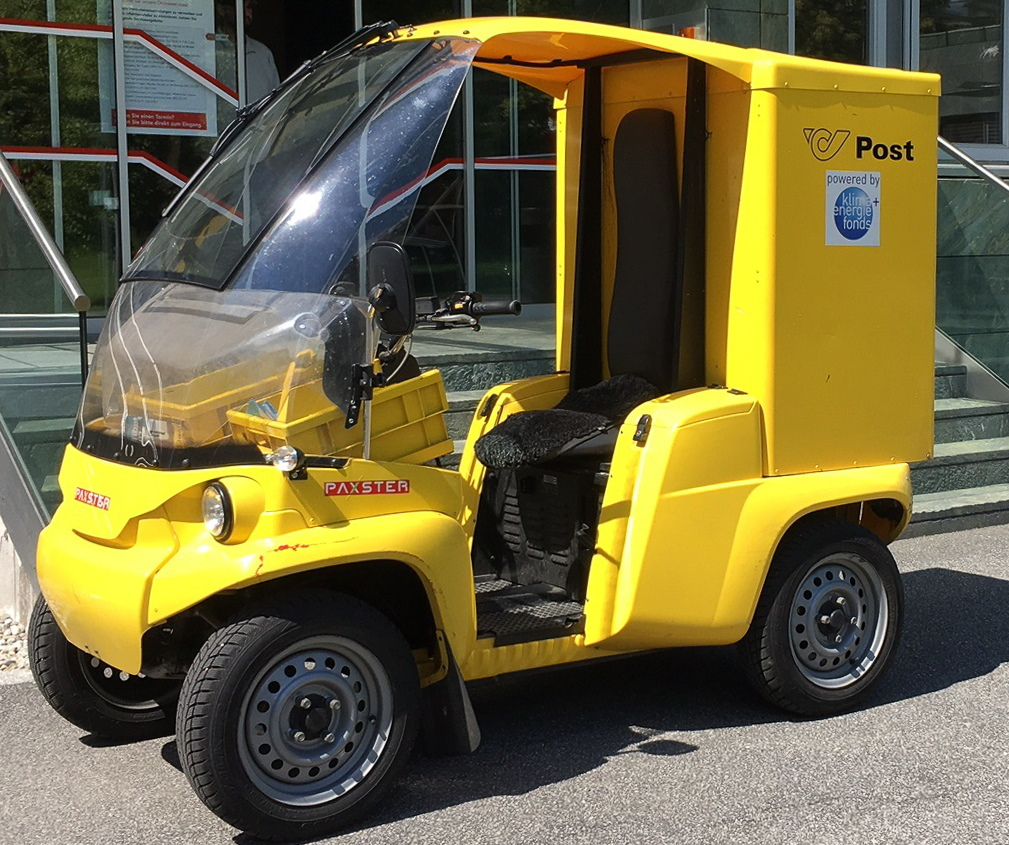
Paxster vehicle used by the Austrian Post

== History ==
Paxster was founded in 2013 in Norway and manufactures small electric vehicles, used by postal companies including Royal Mail in the United Kingdom and New Zealand Post. In May 2025 Paxster opened a factory in Sarpsborg, Norway, at a cost of 55 million kroner, expecting it to manufacture 2,250 vehicles per year.

== Vehicles ==
The Paxster XL vehicle has a range of about 80 kilometres (50 mi), with a maximum speed of 60 kilometres per hour (37 mph). It can carry up to 1,800 litres of goods.

== Use by country ==
=== France ===
The French postal service La Poste uses Paxster vehicles.

=== New Zealand ===
NZ Post rolled out Paxster vehicles over 12 months from 2016. NZ Post had 54 vehicles in July 2016, increasing to 423 by 2018. In 2018, 80 postal workers were injured while driving Paxster vehicles, but the injuries were less severe than when NZ Post used bicycles as before.

=== United Kingdom ===
In late 2025 Royal Mail bought 100 Paxster vehicles.
