= Journeyman =

Skilled worker who has successfully completed an official apprenticeship

A journeyman is a worker, skilled in a given building trade or craft, who has successfully completed an official apprenticeship qualification. Journeymen are considered competent and authorized to work in that field as a fully qualified employee. They earn their license by education, supervised experience and examination. Although journeymen have completed a trade certificate and are allowed to work as employees, they may not yet work as self-employed master craftsmen.

The term "journeyman" was originally used in the medieval trade guilds. Journeymen were paid daily and the word "journey" is derived from journée, meaning "whole day" in French. Each individual guild generally recognised three ranks of workers: apprentices, journeymen, and masters. A journeyman, as a qualified tradesman, could become a master and run their own business, but most continued working as employees.

Guidelines were put in place to promote responsible tradesmen, who were held accountable for their own work and to protect the individual trade and the general public from unskilled workers. To become a master, a journeyman has to submit a master piece of work to a guild for evaluation. Only after evaluation can a journeyman be admitted to the guild as a master. Sometimes, a journeyman was required to accomplish a three-year working trip, which may be called the Wanderjahre.

== Origin ==
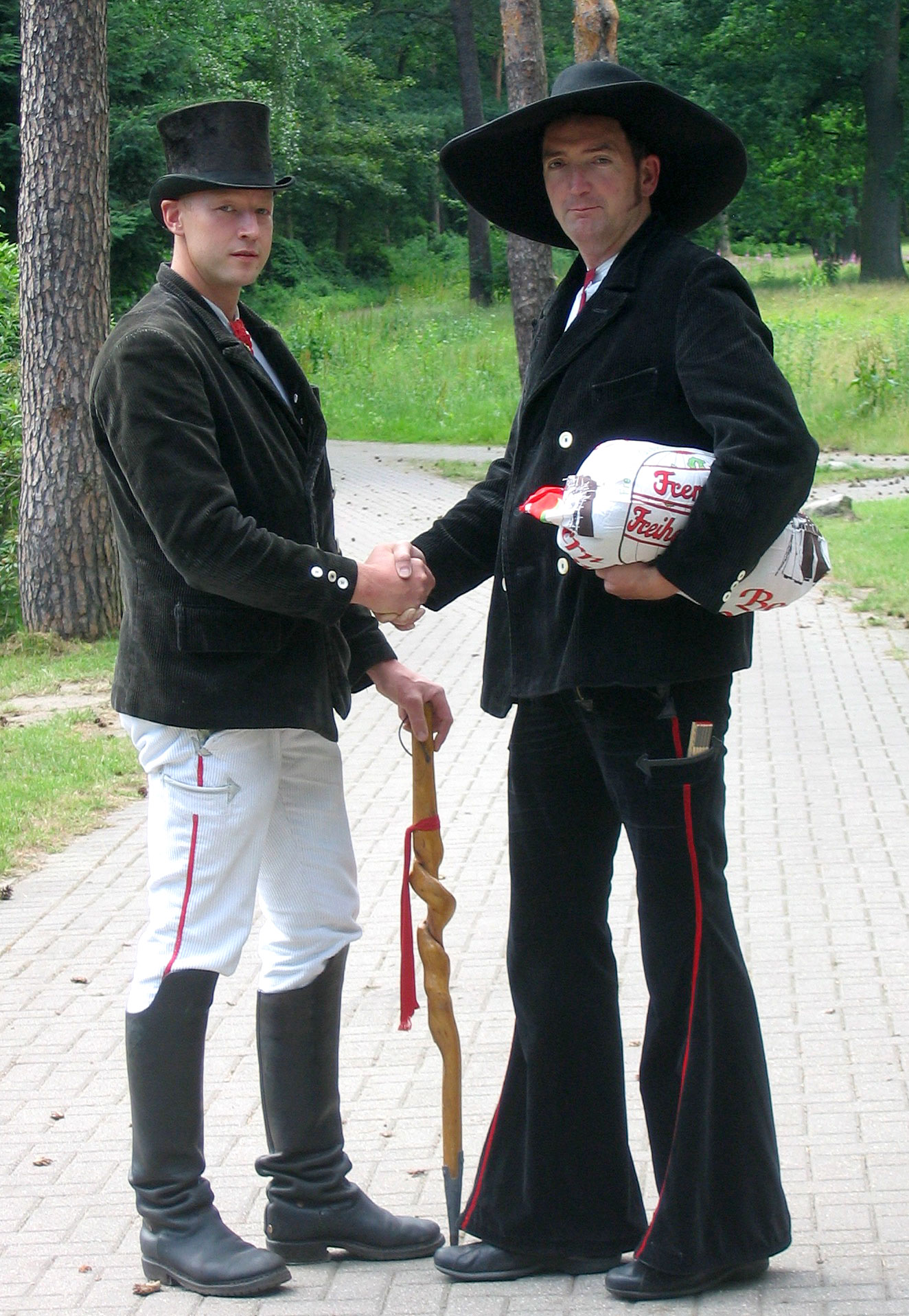
German wandering journeymen in traditional uniform

The word journey comes from the French journée (day), which in turn comes from the Latin diurnus (pertaining to a day, daily). The title "journeyman" refers to the right to charge a fee for each day's work. A journeyman has completed an apprenticeship but is employed by another such as a master craftsman, but they would live apart and might have a family of their own. A journeyman could not employ others. In contrast, an apprentice would be bound to a master, usually for a fixed term of seven years, and lived with the master as a member of the household, receiving most or all compensation in the form of food, lodging, and training.

In parts of Europe, as in Late Medieval Germany, spending time as a wandering journeyman (Wandergeselle), moving from one town to another to gain experience of different workshops, was an important part of the training of an aspirant master. Carpenters and other artisans in German-speaking countries have retained the tradition of wandering journeymen even today, but only a few still practice it. In France, wandering journeymen were known as compagnons.

The term has acquired from this a secondary meaning: a worker whose skills are competent but not extraordinary.

== Modern era ==
In modern vocational training systems, "journeyman" is primarily a distinction in certain skilled building trades which requires the completion of a supervised apprenticeship under a master of that craft or trade. After fulfilling additional requirements (which vary widely), a journeyman may go on to become a master of their craft.

=== United States ===
In the United States, apprenticeship programs and occupational certifications are regulated at the state and local (city or county) level. Hence the requirements for certification as a journeyman vary greatly depending on the trade and jurisdiction. In general, the term applies to one who has completed an apprenticeship program and earned the requisite certification, which may require the completion of a certain number of supervised field hours under a master of the trade and a certification exam. Journeymen steel workers, electrical workers, pipefitters, and iron workers, (to name a few) are represented by trade-specific labor unions.

=== Australia ===
In Australia, a journeyman registration permits the holder to work under the general direction of an advanced tradesman. A journeyman may oversee the work of apprentices and trades assistants but may not contract for work using that particular registration. A journeyman-level qualification is obtained by completing a formal apprenticeship. An apprenticeship entails learning a skilled trade under the supervision of an advanced tradesperson. An apprentice is a trainee who is being formally trained and qualified in a particular trade. The duration of an apprenticeship is usually three to four years, depending on the trade. On completion of the training, the apprentice will receive a nationally recognised qualification, a trade certificate. Practical on-the-job learning makes up the majority of an apprenticeship, but it also incorporates some classroom learning. As of 2016, apprenticeships offered real-life experience in the workplace, a regular income and new skills. Examples of licensed trades are plumbers and gasfitters, electricians, air-conditioning and refrigeration mechanics, and carpenters and joiners.

=== New Zealand ===
In New Zealand, the journeyman class recognizes that a person has had formal training in a trade, and allows them to register and be licensed as a journeyman in that trade. While they are considered fully trained, their level of skill is considered intermediate. A journeyman is required to work under the supervision of a fully qualified tradesman. An apprentice is eligible for journeyman registration after they have completed the New Zealand National Certificate (Level 4) in Plumbing, Gasfitting or Drainlaying but haven’t yet passed the relevant theory examination. A candidate must apply formally to the Plumbers, Gasfitters and Drainlayers Board. A journeyman cannot be a business owner or manage employees, but is expected to do service calls in coordination with and at the behest of the master tradesman. They may also work independently when their skill level permits.

=== Canada ===
In Canada, in addition to completion of apprenticeship in a skilled trade, the worker may also choose to write an exam to be recognized throughout the country under the Interprovincial Standards Red Seal Program.

== See also ==
- Air Force Occupational Badge
- Compagnons du Tour de France
- Journeyman papers
- Wandering journeyman (Waltz)
- Journeyman (boxing)
- Tradesperson
- Vocational education
