= 7th World Scout Jamboree =

Reunion of scouts held in Austria in August, 1951

- Theme: Jamboree of Simplicity
- Location: Bad Ischl
- Country: Austria
- Date: 3-12 August 1951
- Attendance: 12,884 Scouts
Previous; 6th World Scout Jamboree	Next; 8th World Scout Jamboree

The 7th World Scout Jamboree (German: 7. Weltpfadfindertreffen) was held from 3 to 12 August 1951, and was hosted by Austria at Bad Ischl in Upper Austria. The attendance was 12,884 from 61 different parts of the world, with 675 German Scouts given a warm welcome as official participants in a World Jamboree for the first time. The Austrian contingent was slightly outnumbered by the Commonwealth contingent and had reduced the minimum age for their attendees from 14, the normal Jamboree age, to 13, since the revived organization had only been in existence for five years. The 7th World Scout Jamboree was also the last Jamboree for which Austria were the host country.

== Prologue ==
At the 1949 International Scout Conference in Norway, invitations for the 1951 Conference and quadrennial World Jamboree were presented by Austria and Denmark. The vote was overwhelmingly in favor of Austria as it was a small country, a World Jamboree had never been staged there, Austrian Scouts had been forbidden in 1938 and had made their own comeback in 1946. The majority of the countries represented at the Conference had been at war with the then Austrian State only five years before, and there was a great desire to show that the brotherhood of Scouting was a reality.

In voicing the invitation, the Austrian International Commissioner, Adolf Klarer, said that the Seventh Jamboree "would have to put up with great simplicity." This itself appealed to the Conference as suiting the primary purpose of World Jamborees, to bring Scouts together from all over the world and so strengthen the feeling of unity and fellowship, so the "Jamboree of Simplicity" was born.

== Symbols ==
The emblem for the campsite was an image of the fleur-de-lis scouting logo surrounded by a Jew's harp; on the campsite, over 10,000 Jew's harps were subsequently purchased. A camp song Brüder auf und hört die Melodie (Arise brothers and hear the melody) was composed by Alexej Stachowitsch and accompanied with backing music.

Austria's postal delivery service also designed and produced over 1,000,000 copies of a commemorative stamp for the occasion.

== Jamboree ==
As at the 1947 Moisson Jamboree, there were many difficulties to be overcome by the 10,000 Austrian Scouts. The Austrian government administered the country under foreign control, still divided into American, British, Soviet and French occupation zones. Preparations were started immediately, and the site near Bad Ischl in the Salzkammergut was selected in November 1949 while snow lay on the ground.

The budget for the Jamboree was fixed at six million Austrian schillings, after J. S. Wilson added 15% to the Austrian estimate, anticipating that staples like milk would inflate in price, which they did. 500,000 Schillings were granted as a subsidy of the Austrian Federal Government. The final contribution fee for each participant equated to 338 Schilling (€24.56).

Doubts has been expressed because while Bad Ischl was in the American Zone, it lay close to the Soviet Zone. However, Austrian Scout troops had been permitted to start and carry on quietly in the Soviet Zone, and no attempt was made to interfere with them, so members of these troops also attended the Jamboree.

The main campsite was divided into seven different sub-campsites, with each one being named after a different federal state of Austria. Two further campsites also housed the heads of the delegation as well as guests. 521 so-called "Service Rovers" also helped support the setting up of the grounds.

During the event seven lit towers were erected to symbolize previous Jamborees. As the name of each Jamboree was announced, a flag was hoisted on one of the towers and the song of that Jamboree sung. Other key events included the official opening and closing of the campsite, a bridge building competition for partaking Scouts, and two bonfire evenings for both participants and visitors of the Jamboree.

One Scout attended from Japan, knowing no language other than his own and the word "Jamboree", yet he made the journey with no problem. The sight of Scouts waving the welcome flags at the airport told him that he had arrived at the right place.

Contingents came from Algeria, Armenia, Australia, Belgium, Bolivia, Brazil, British Guyana, Burma, Cameroon, Canada, Ceylon, Chile, Cuba, Cyprus, Denmark, Germany, Egypt, El Salvador, France, French Equatorial Africa, French West Africa, Gibraltar, Great Britain, Greece, Hong Kong, Iceland, India, Iraq, Ireland, Italy, Jamaica, Japan, Kenya, Lebanon, Liechtenstein, Luxembourg, Madagascar, Malaya, Mexico, Morocco, Malta, the Netherlands, New Zealand, Nigeria, Norway, Pakistan, Portugal, Sierra Leone, Southern Rhodesia, South Africa, Sudan, Sweden, Switzerland, Syria, Togo, Tunisia, the United States, Venezuela and Vietnam. Because in countries under Soviet occupation, Scout groups were forcibly dissolved or merged with the so-called "Young Pioneer" groups, exile Scouts from Eastern Europe participated in the contingents of Germany and Austria.

== Reunions ==
In 1991 and 2001 (organised in conjunction with the state campsite b.open), a reunion of the 7th World Jamboree took place in Bad Ischl. Additional stones were placed next to the original memorial stone for the jamboree. The Australian contingent and New Zealand contingents to the 7th World Jamboree still have reunions every two years..

== See also ==
- World Scout Jamboree
- Scouting in displaced persons camps
