= Hrvatska pošta =

National postal operator of Croatia

HP-Hrvatska pošta d.d. "Croatian Post Inc."
- Type: State-owned joint-stock company
- Industry: Postal services, courier
- Founded: 1999; 27 years ago (first occurrence of Croatian national postal services in 1848)
- Headquarters: Poštanska ulica 9 Velika Gorica, Croatia
- Key people: Ivana Mrkonjić (chair); Siniša Šukunda; Hrvoje Parlov; Miroslav Matešić
- Services: Letter post, parcel service, EMS, financial and retail services, digital television
- Number of employees: 8925 (2025)
- Website: posta.hr

Hrvatska pošta (lit. 'Croatian Post') is a state-owned joint-stock company in Croatia that performs postal and payment transactions. Founded in 1999, it is the national postal operator in the Republic of Croatia.

It is one of the largest service and retail networks in the country. In addition to postal and logistics services, it also offers financial and retail services, and issues postage stamps of the Republic of Croatia. It is one of the co-founders and a full member of the Association of European Public Postal Operators (PostEurop).

== History ==
In 1990, the Croatian Parliament established the public company Croatian Post and Telecommunications (Hrvatska pošta i telekomunikacije, HPT), with the main purpose of providing postal and telecommunications services. The company was the legal successor that took over the rights and obligations of the 13 companies under the former national operator PTT-promet. It consisted of the Office of the Director, Economic Affairs Division, Legal, Human Resources and General Affairs Division, Internal Control and Audit Service, and the Post and Telecommunications Directorates.

Given the diversity of activities and the technologically separate functioning of the Post Office and the Telecommunications Directorate, and in line with global trends, in 1999 HPT split into two companies: Croatian Telecommunications and Croatian Post. It has operated as an independent joint stock company ever since.

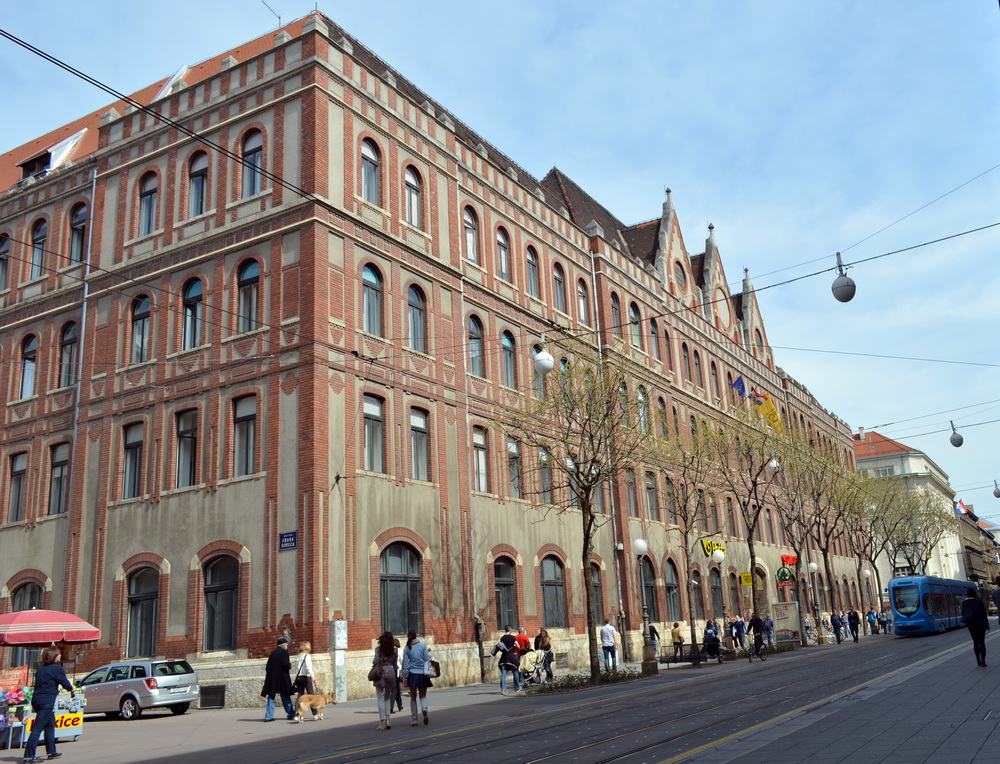
Former headquarters building in Zagreb, which was damaged in the 2020 earthquake

The Croatian Post was the co-founder of PostEurop in 1993, a trade association established to represent the interest of national postal operators towards governments. On 1 July 2019, the Croatian Post also became a member of the International Post Corporation (IPC), an international organization that brings together leading postal operators in Europe, North America and Asia Pacific.

In October 2019, the Croatian Post took over the company Locodels, which specializes in same-day city delivery. At the beginning of 2020, it successfully tested drone delivery from the Zadar port of Gaženica to Preko on the Ugljan Island. It is part of a pilot project with the Croatian company AIR-RMLD, which develops commercial and industrial services with drones.

The Croatian Post was headquartered at the General Post Office in Jurišićeva ulica near Ban Jelačić Square, but after the building was damaged during the 2020 earthquake, the headquarters were relocated to the old package sorting facility next to the Main Railway Station. In September 2023, the Croatian Post permanently changed their headquarters to Velika Gorica, next to a new, bigger package sorting facility.

== Company structure ==
The company is divided into four divisions: Post Division, Network Division, Express Division and Support Division. The Post Division is in charge of transporting, sorting and delivering letter-post items. The Network Division manages the network of post offices. The Express Division is in charge of the express delivery service – Paket24. The Support Division is, among other things, in charge of finance and real property, and is the only division that is centralized. The Croatian Post is governed by the Management Board which works together with the Supervisory Board. Its operations are overseen by an Audit Committee, as required by law.

By organizational structure, it is divided into six regions for better efficiency.

== Operations ==
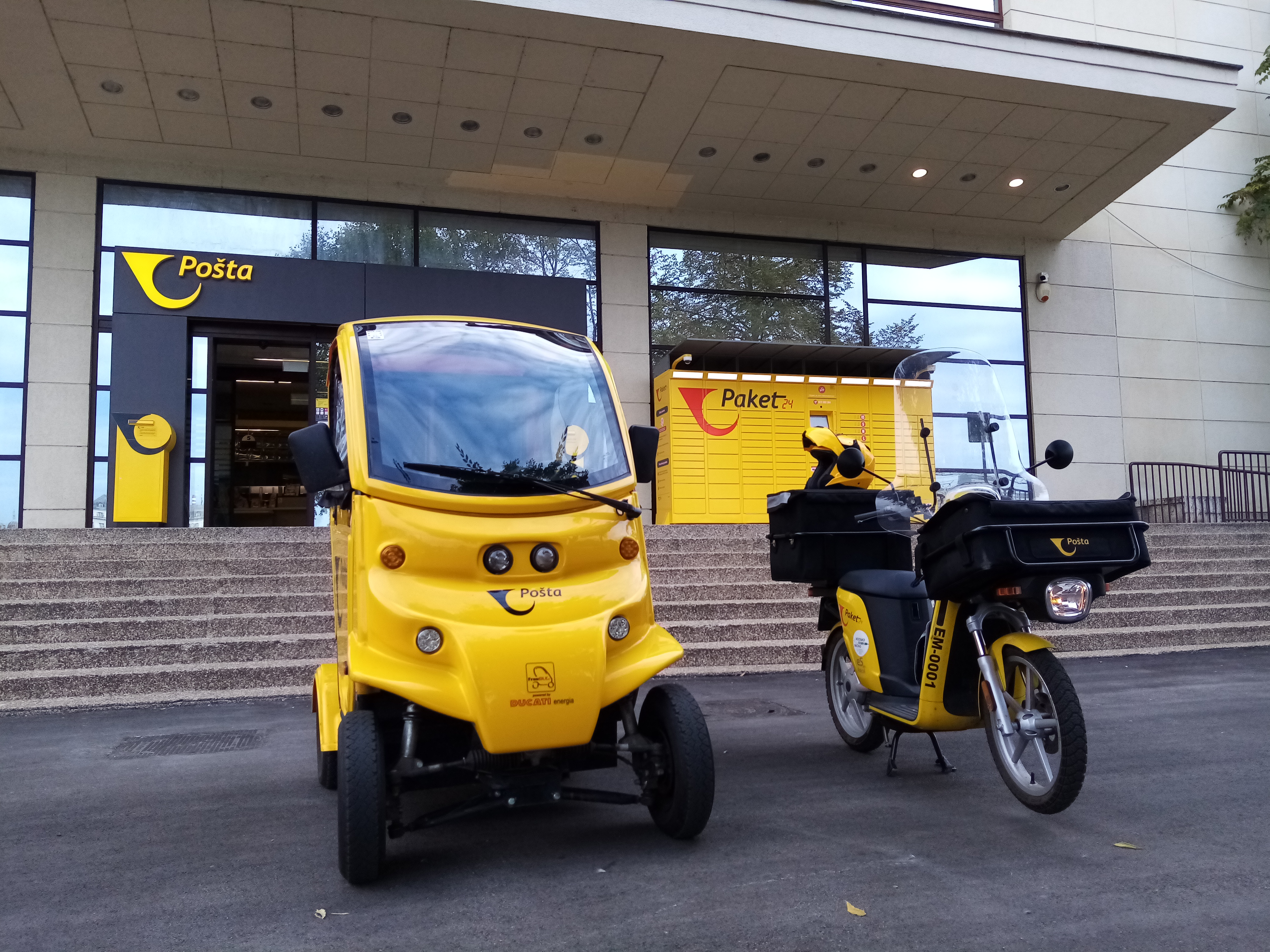
An electric quadracycle and moped

Croatian Post operates seven sorting centers across the country: in Velika Gorica, Split, Zadar, Osijek, Slavonski Brod, Bjelovar and near Rijeka.

The construction of a new package sorting center in Velika Gorica began in May 2017, a project worth more than €46.5 million. It was officially opened in September 2019 and is the largest investment in the history of the Croatian Post. The total area of the facility is 32,000 square meters, with a processing capacity of 15,000 packets an hour. It will be in use together with the old sorting facility next to the Main Railway Station, which had been in use since 1939. In March 2022, a new package sorting center worth €8 million was opened in the Bakar-Kukuljanovo industrial zone near the city of Rijeka. It serves Istria, Primorje and Gorski Kotar. Opening of the two facilities marked an end to the largest investment cycle in the history of the company, worth €160 million.

The Croatian Post currently has more than 400 electric vehicles in its fleet, including bicycles, mopeds, quadracycles and vans. Charging stations for electric vehicles are set up in Velika Gorica, Osijek and Zadar, allowing them to expand this fleet in the future. In its financial reports, the company claims it plans to become carbon neutral by 2040.

== Services ==
=== Postal services ===
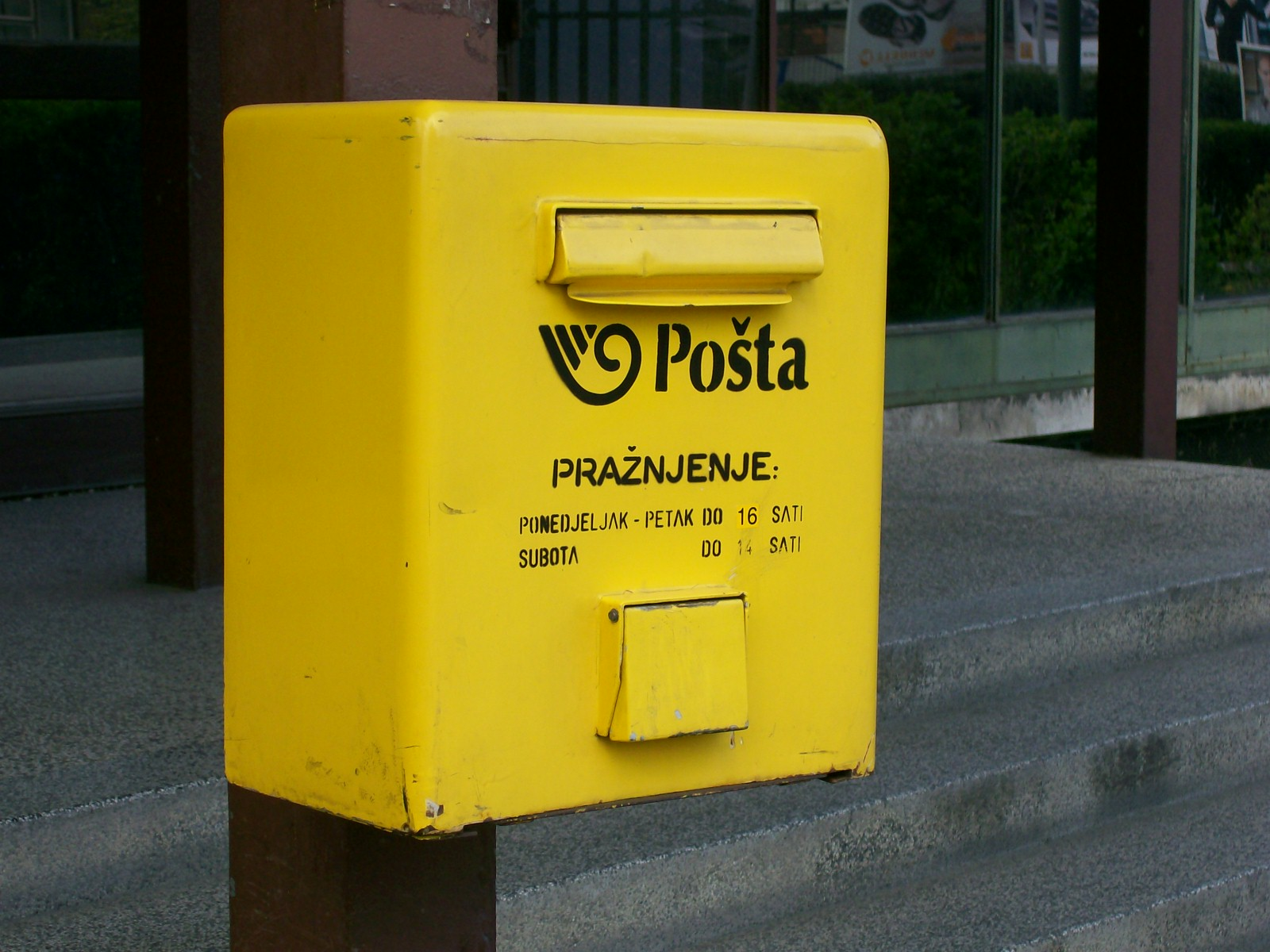
A post box

The Croatian Post is the national postal operator, and the postal services it offers include the acceptance, sorting, transport and delivery of postal items in domestic and international traffic. Universal postal services are provided on the entire territory of the Republic of Croatia and to all users under the same conditions. In addition to universal services, the Croatian Post also provides a number of other services like banking services and acceptance, sorting, transport and delivery of stationery (books and printing), parcels, international business replies and value-added shipments.

=== ePost ===
ePost is a service to perform a number of services electronically. It allows users to receive and send letters, messages and documents in electronic form, pay bills electronically and save documents in a secure archive.

=== Bank at the Post ===
'Bank at the Post' is a collaboration with Hrvatska poštanska banka that allows customers to use the banking services of said bank at the post offices. Like in a real bank, people can open new bank accounts, withdraw and deposit money, perform payment transactions and other banking services. The project was first introduced to physical consumers, but was expanded in 2020 to private businesses as well.

=== Package delivery ===
In April 2021, the Croatian Post began to install parcel lockers across the country for the package delivery service called Paket24. The delivery and sending of items is handled by Croatian Post workers. The Croatian Post also bought Locodels, a company that provides delivery services in major Croatian cities. The service is used by businesses that need to deliver their products to consumers.

=== Stamps ===
The Croatian Post has been issuing postage stamps of the Republic of Croatia since 1991. The first regular postage stamp, Zagreb-Dubrovnik Airport, was issued on 9 September 1991, and the first commemorative postage stamp was issued on 10 December 1991 on the occasion of the declaration of independence of the Republic of Croatia. Since then, the Croatian Post has issued a total of 1,360 postage stamps (September 2021) with a wide range of topics and motifs. Postage stamps issued by the Croatian Post have also won numerous international awards and competitions.

=== Cryptocurrencies ===
In December 2019, the cryptocurrency redemption service was introduced, in cooperation with Croatian crypto brokerage Electrocoin, in 55 post offices in all counties where foreign and domestic users can convert cryptocurrencies into euros. In October 2021, the service was extended to sell cryptocurrencies.

In September 2020, the Croatian Post issued the first Croatian crypto stamp. The stamp consists of a physical and a digital part. The physical part of the crypto stamp can be detached and used to pay postage, while the digital part in the form of an NFT remains for use on the blockchain. This made Croatia the third country in the world to issue its own NFT, after Austria and Gibraltar. It was issued in five categories with five different motifs depicting means of transport: van (60,000 copies), train (25,000 copies), ship (10,000 copies), airplane (4,000 copies) and drone (1,000 copies). The crypto stamp was designed in cooperation with the Croatian blockchain community, and the "Postereum" digital token was made by Croatian companies BitX and NodeFactory. All 500 exclusive physical crypto stamps, available only for purchase with cryptocurrencies, were sold in 16 hours.

The second edition of the crypto stamp was released in December 2020 and was issued in a sheet with one self-adhesive stamp and printed in the quantity of 30,000 copies. The stamp has five digital motifs featuring the subject of postal items transport throughout history: an Austro-Hungarian postman, a postillion on a horse, a mail carriage, a telegraph delivery man on a bicycle, and a postman on a moped.

The third crypto stamp was presented in September 2021, with the motif of an electric sports car Rimac Nevera. The Nevera motif appears in five different categories: the golden Rimac Nevera was issued in 2,000 copies, silver in 4,000, bronze in 6,000, grey in 8,000, and the blue-green in 10,000 copies, making for a total of 30,000 copies. The 1,500 issued physical crypto stamps, which were only available for purchase with cryptocurrencies, sold out in little over three days.

The Croatian Post released the fourth, fifth and sixth crypto stamps in 2022, 2023 and 2024 respectively.

=== Croatian Post Foundation ===
In 2011, the Croatian Post established the “Vaša pošta” Foundation ("Your post" Foundation, later renamed to Croatian Post Foundation) in order to provide financial assistance to children without adequate parental care to help them become independent. The foundation is funded by sponsors, who donate in order to pay life insurance policies on behalf of the children. After leaving the foster home, that child gets €250 a month until a €6000 threshold is reached, easing the cost of living until employment. The establishment of the Foundation is a continuation of the project “Good People to the Children of Croatia”, which was established in 2009.

== Sources ==
- "Hrvatska pošta d.d.". Croatian Encyclopedia (in Croatian). Miroslav Krleža Institute of Lexicography.
