= General Post Office, Zagreb =

Headquarters of the Croatian Post in Zagreb, Croatia

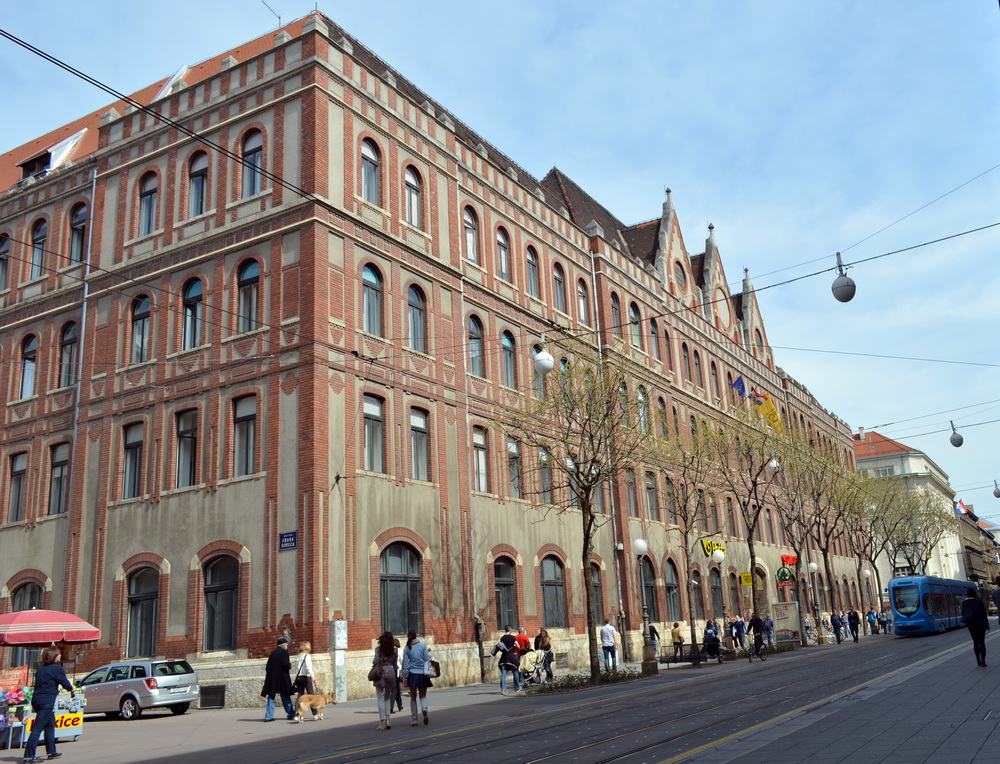
- Interactive map of the General Post Office, Zagreb area

General information
- Architectural style: Hungarian Secession
- Location: 13 Jurišićeva Street, Zagreb, Croatia
- Coordinates: 45°48′45″N 15°58′52″E
- Construction started: 1903
- Inaugurated: 12 September 1904
- Owner: Croatian Post

Technical details
- Floor count: 3 (1904–1930); 4 (1930–present)

Design and construction
- Architects: Ernő Foerk and Gyula Sándy

The General Post Office in Jurišićeva Street, Zagreb, was the headquarters of the Croatian Post, the national postal service of Croatia. Built in 1904 in the Hungarian Secession style, the Post Office housed mail, parcel, telegraph and telephone services and equipment. Today, it is a protected cultural monument.

== History ==
The first government post office in Zagreb was established in 1831. The rise of mail volume, as well as the introduction of telegraph in 1850 and a public telephone system in 1887, created a pressing need for a new post office building.

=== Design and construction ===
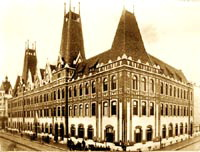
The building's original appearance (pictured) was substantially changed in 1930 with the addition of the third story and the removal of turrets.

The project, created by the Hungarian architects Ernő Foerk and Gyula Sándy in the Hungarian Secession style, envisioned an 82-metre (269 ft) long two-story building made of weather-resistant red brick and stone, with three entrances.

The construction in a 3,950-square-metre (42,500 sq ft) building site in Jurišićeva Street began in 1903, and the new General Post Office started its work on 12 September 1904. The ground floor was dedicated to mail and parcel services, with a telephone booth section, while the first floor housed telegraph and telephone switchboards. The telephone switchboard had a capacity of 1200 subscribers and 2000 connections, and was opened later in the same year.

=== Pre-World War II adaptations ===
By 1925, the preparations for installing a new automatic switchboard for 10,000 subscribers were already underway. In 1926, an additional three-story courtyard wing was completed. The new Siemens-made automatic switchboard became operational in 1928. In 1930, the third story was added to the building, and the original roof turrets were permanently removed in the process.

=== 1941 sabotage ===
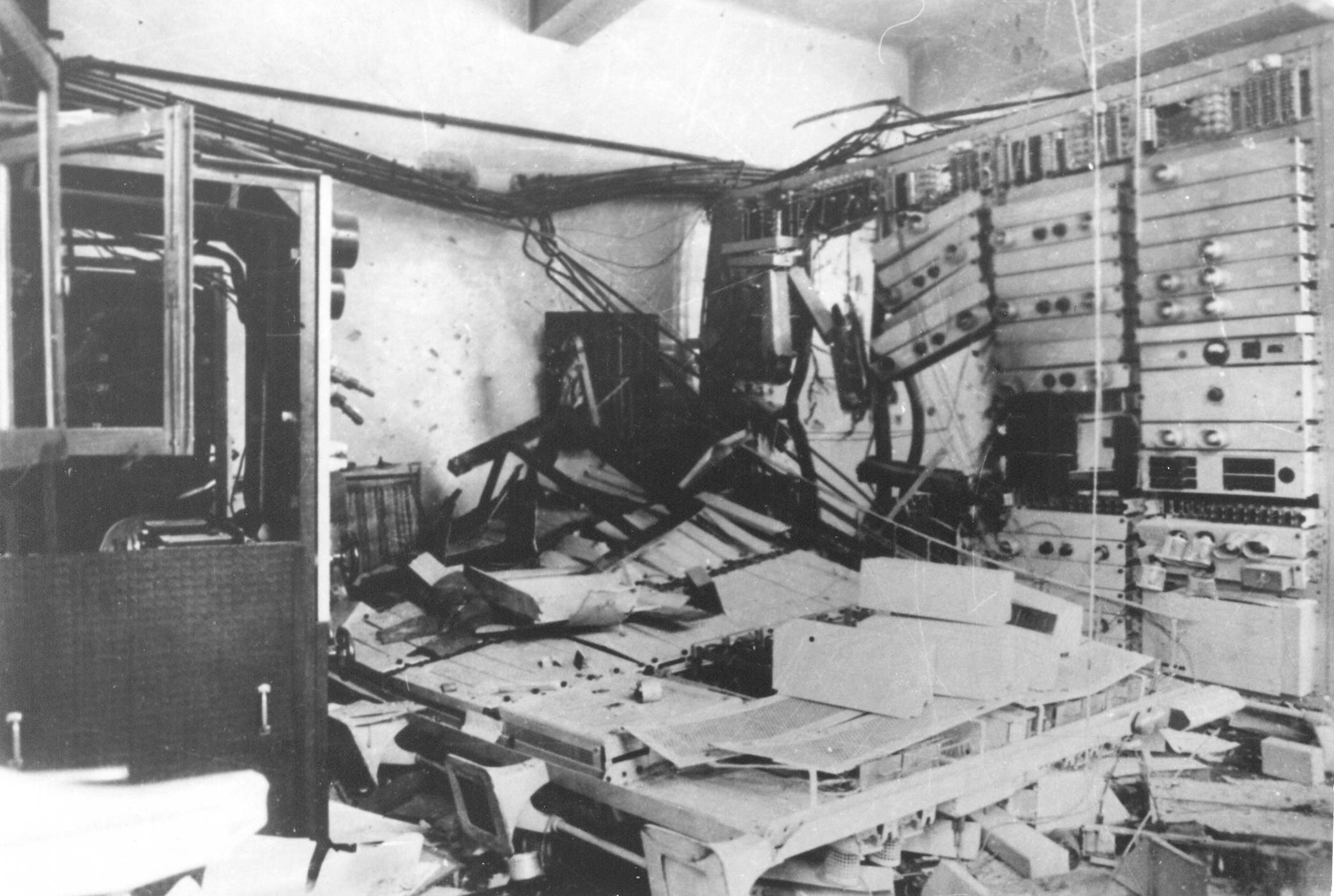
Aftermath of the 1941 sabotage

On 14 September 1941, the telephone switchboard was destroyed in a sabotage organized by Rade Končar of the Communist Party of Croatia as an act of resistance against the Axis-aligned regime of the Independent State of Croatia. The sabotage was executed by three postal employees who managed to smuggle explosives into the strictly guarded building, and plant them in the switchboard during the night shift. After they left the city in the morning, an associate remotely detonated the charges by dialing a preselected phone number. The blast broke all the windows in the building and killed one police agent, injuring several more. The resulting damage caused significant disruption of international telephone service and required an extensive repair.

=== Post-World War II history ===
The building saw its second major adaptation in 1958, in which two side entrances were walled up, leaving only the main entrance from Jurišićeva Street. The 2001 adaptation undid some of the interior changes made in 1958, when luxurious details, such as majolica-decorated arches, were covered and thus hidden from view. Today, the General Post Office is a protected cultural monument.

The General Post Office building hosts the Museum of Post and Telecommunications, founded in 1953 and opened to the public since 1997. It is owned and operated by T-Hrvatski Telekom.

The General Post Office was featured on a HRK 2.30 postage stamp issued by the Croatian Post in 2004, as well as on a €0.70 postage stamp issued by the Österreichische Post in 2012.

The building has been closed due to damage it sustained in the 2020 earthquake. On 8 September 2023, the Croatian Post moved their headquarters to Velika Gorica, as part of the giant package sorting complex.
