= Austrian post offices in Crete =

This article provides an overview of the Austrian post-offices presence in Crete and the use of French currency on Austrian stamps in the Ottoman Empire.

== Postal History ==
Along with several other nations, the Austro-Hungarian Empire maintained its own post offices in Crete in the late 19th and early 20th centuries. The three post offices, in Chania, Heraklion and Rethymno, operated from 1890 until 1914, replacing earlier Austrian Lloyd postal agencies and official Austrian postal agencies which operated in turn in these towns starting in 1837 and 1845 respectively.

== Stamp issues ==
These offices used Austrian stamps denominated or surcharged in various currencies (Lombardy–Venetian soldi, Turkish paras and piastres, and French centimes and francs) or, much more rarely, used regular not surcharged Austrian stamps.

=== French currency issues ===
In order to better compete with the French post offices, regular Austrian stamps were overprinted in French currency in 1903 (values 5 Centimes to 4 Francs). The last set was in 1908–1914 in designs similar to the Austrian set commemorating the 60th anniversary of the Emperor's accession.

Many stamp collectors and catalogues have traditionally referred to just the French currency issues as "Austrian Post Offices in Crete", distinguishing them from the Turkish currency issues which have been referred to as "Austrian post offices in the Ottoman Empire" or as "Austrian Levant". However, stamps in both currencies were in use both in the offices in Crete and in many other Austrian post offices within the Ottoman Empire. Ferchenbauer explains that the reason is that it was not officially permitted to admit the competition outside Crete island.

Used in the offices in Crete
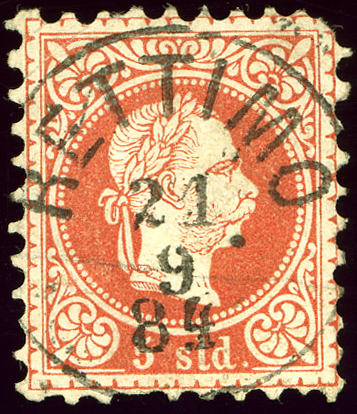
5 soldi (Austrian Levant) cancelled at RETTIMO Rethymno in 1884

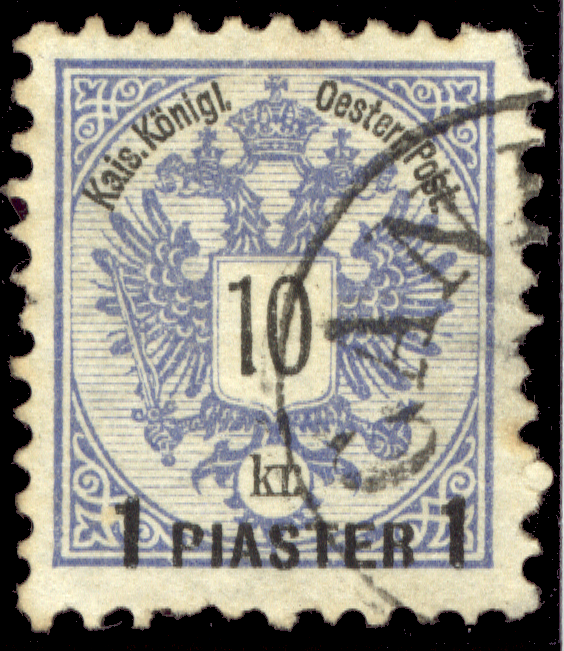
An Austrian Levant stamp with a Cretan postmark, possibly Candia

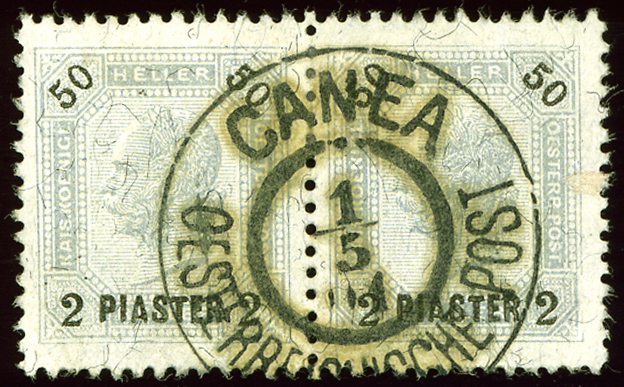
2 piaster overprint 50 heller pair cancelled at CANEA Chania in 1901

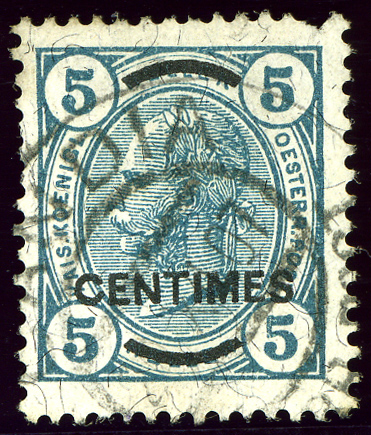
5 centimes (issue 1906) overprint cancelled in 1907 at CANDIA Heraklion
Used in the Austrian post offices in the Ottoman Empire
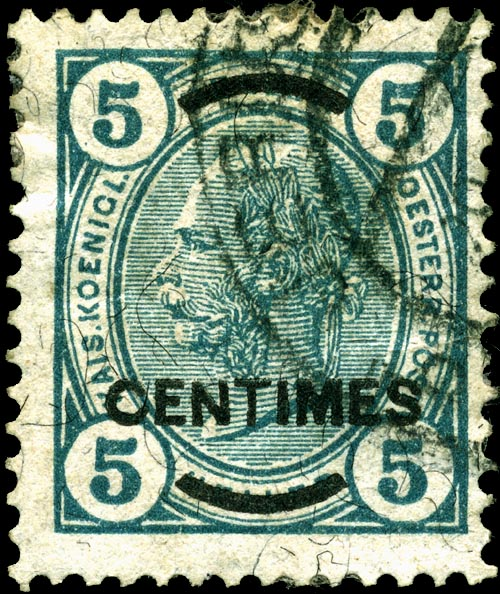
This 5-centimes overprint stamp was cancelled at Jerusalem.

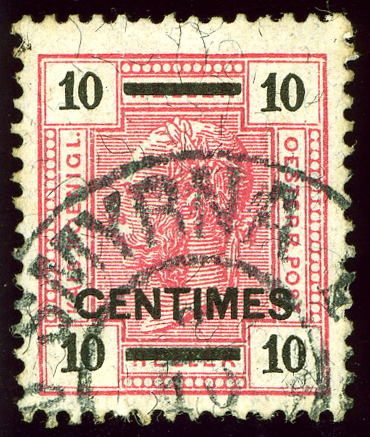
10 centimes (issue 1906) cancelled at Smyrna in Turkey

== See also ==
- Austrian post offices in the Ottoman Empire

== References and sources ==
Sources

- Stanley Gibbons Stamp Catalogue - Part 2: Austria & Hungary, 6th Edition 2002, pp 148–152
- Rienk M. Feenstra & Friends, Crete: Postal History, Postage and Revenue Stamps, Coins & Banknotes (collectio, 2001, ISBN 960-85275-6-2)
- AskPhil – Glossary of Stamp Collecting Terms
- Encyclopaedia of Postal History
- Rossiter, Stuart & John Flower. The Stamp Atlas. London: Macdonald, 1986, p. 331. ISBN 0-356-10862-7
