= Austrian post offices in Liechtenstein =

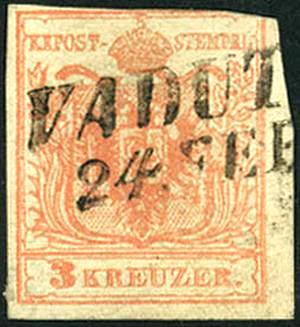
An Austrian stamp used in Vaduz, Liechtenstein

In the 19th century the Principality of Liechtenstein had no postal service of its own. In 1818 the first post office was established in Balzers. From then on the Austrian post delivered all postal consignments. In 1845 another post office opened in the capital Vaduz. In 1852 after the introduction of postage stamps Liechtenstein's government closed a contract with Austria which regulated the execution of the postal system by Austria. This contract was renewed in 1876. Regarding the postal delivery Liechtenstein was equal to Austria. The postage within the country and to Austria was the same as within Austria. Austrian postage stamps were used too.

Other post offices were established in Nendeln (1864), Schaan (1872), and Triesen (1890). During the time of the Austrian postal administration there never had been more than five post offices. On 1 March 1912 Nendeln's post office was moved to Eschen.

In 1911 major points of the contract were amended by a new agreement, which came into force on 1 January 1912. The postal administration was still managed by Austria, but all existing postal institutions were then called "K. k. österreichisches u. fürstlich liechtensteinsches Post- u. Telegraphenamt", which effected only some official seals then showing together the two coat of arms. Their own stamps for the use at Liechtenstein's post offices were issued too, but the Austrian stamps were still valid. The Austrian postal administration had to pay a general sum of 10,000 kronen per year for the assignment of the service. On 1 October 1916 that sum was increased to 14,000 kronen.

On 18 February 1920 the contract was cancelled by a new agreement. Austria's postal service stopped at the end of February 1920. For a short time Liechtenstein established its own postal administration, and after concluding a contract with Switzerland, the Swiss postal administration has managed Liechtenstein's postal system since 1 February 1921.
