= Ebenau =

- Municipality
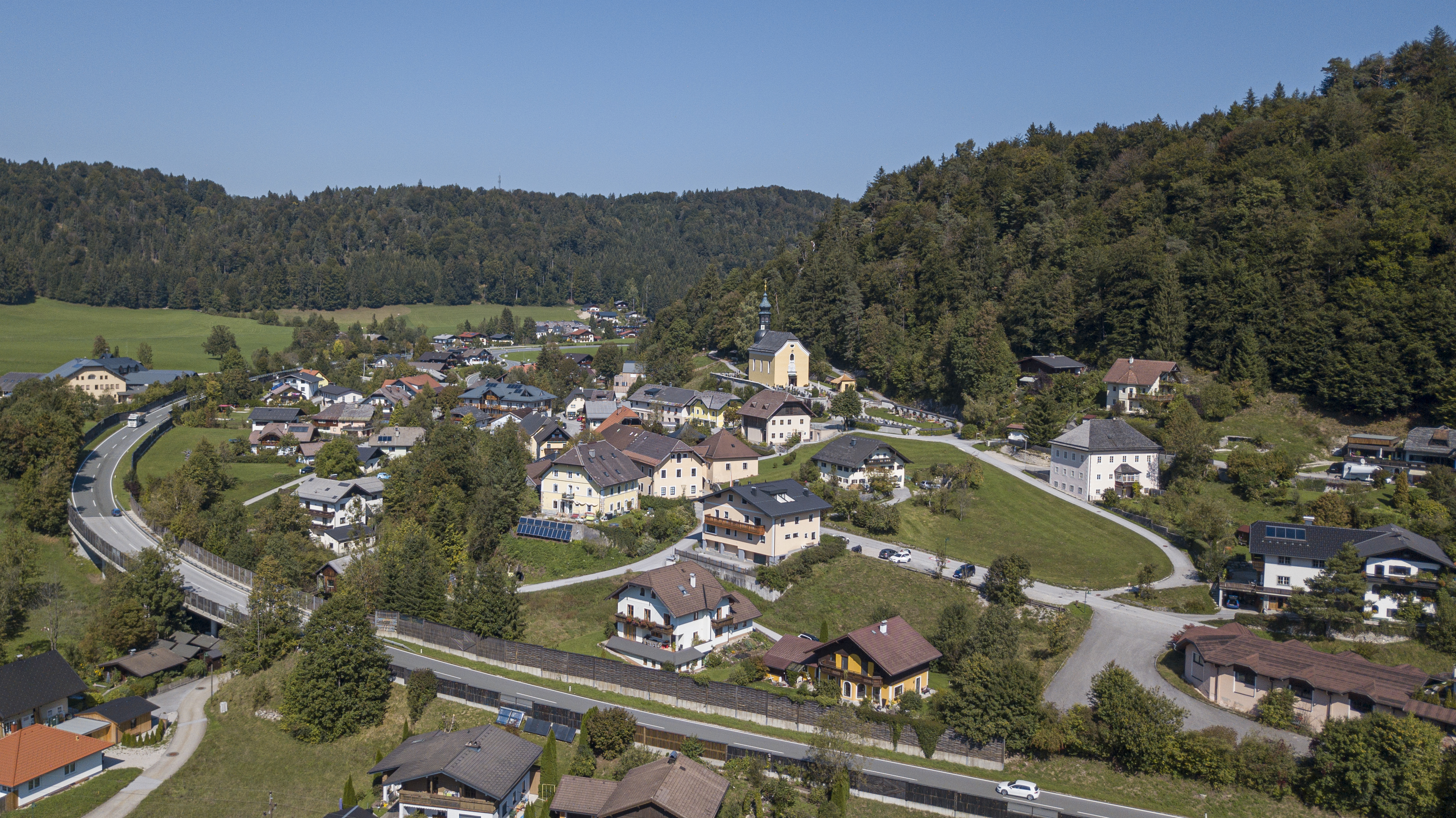
- Ebenau

- Flag Coat of arms

- Location within Austria
- Coordinates: 47°47′00″N 13°10′00″E
- Country: Austria
- State: Salzburg
- District: Salzburg-Umgebung

Government
  - Mayor: Johannes Schweighofer (ÖVP)

Area
  - Total: 17.15 km^{2} (6.62 sq mi)
- Elevation: 623 m (2,044 ft)

Population (2018-01-01)
  - Total: 1,439
  - Density: 83.91/km^{2} (217.3/sq mi)
- Time zone: UTC+1 (CET)
  - Summer (DST): UTC+2 (CEST)
- Postal code: 5323
- Area code: 06221
- Vehicle registration: SL
- Website: www.ebenau.at

Ebenau is a municipality in the district of Salzburg-Umgebung in the state of Salzburg in Austria.

== Tourism ==
The municipality lies in the Salzkammergut region directly east of the city of Salzburg and is noted for its spectacular scenery, including several canyons. Hiking and canyoning opportunities are plentiful.
