= Austrian post offices in the Ottoman Empire =

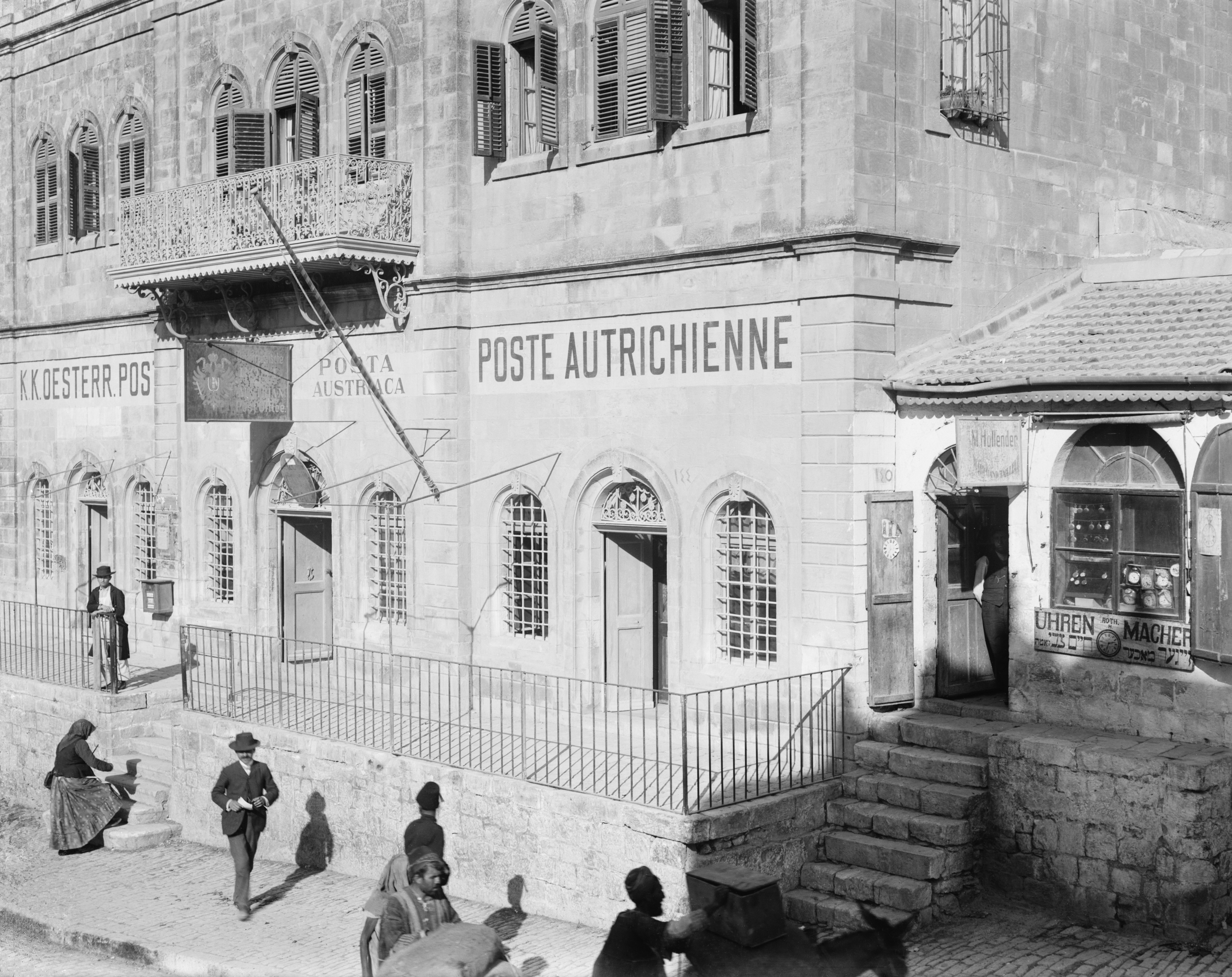
The Jerusalem Austrian Post Office was located inside the Jaffa Gate.

Austria and other European nations maintained an extensive system of post offices in the Ottoman Empire, typically motivated by the unreliable postal system of the Ottomans.

== First and last service period ==
Austria gained permission in 1721 from the Ottoman Empire to operate a postal service for official correspondence only and subsequently this was extended to the opening of post offices and carrying mail for merchants. This resulted in 1748 with the establishment of a post office in Galata outside of Istanbul, and eventually extended to 65 locations throughout the Balkans and the eastern Mediterranean. The oldest known cancellation is a double linear "CONSTAN-TINOPEL" in 1787. The latest remaining Austrian post offices in Turkey area were closed on 30 September 1914.

== Stamp issues ==
Beginning in 1863, stamps of Lombardy-Venetia were used: 2 to 15 soldi, which can be recognized only by the cancellation. After the losses of Lombardy in 1859 and Venetia in 1866, Austria issued in 1867 and 1883 specific stamps, in appearance identical to Austrian stamps of the same period, but valued in soldi (2 to 50 soldi). Details on Levant Austria post-offices using the 1867 issue are given in Part III Postämter in der Levante. In 1886 this was changed to paras and piasters to match the Turkish money already used by other countries, by surcharging the existing stamps of the offices, with further issues between 1888 and 1907: values ranging from 10 paras to 20 piasters.

The Jubilee issue of 1908–1914 included directly values in paras and in piasters.

== Gallery ==
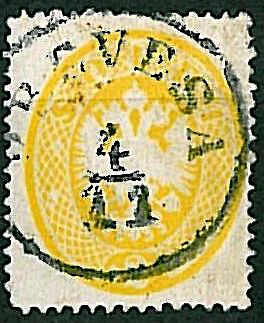
2 soldi, 1863 Lombardy Venice issue, cancelled at Preveza, Rare

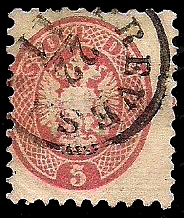
5 soldi, 1864 Lombardy Venice issue, cancelled at Preveza

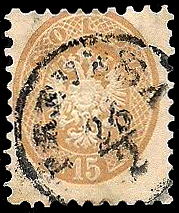
15 soldi, 1864 Lombardy Venice issue, cancelled at Preveza

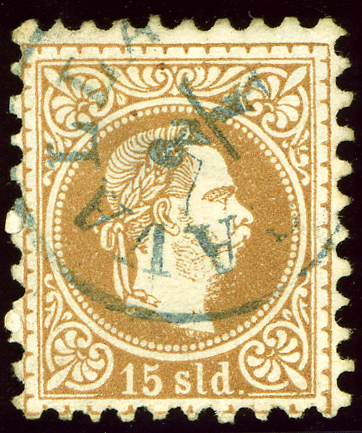
Rare blue CAVALLA cancellation (Kavala)

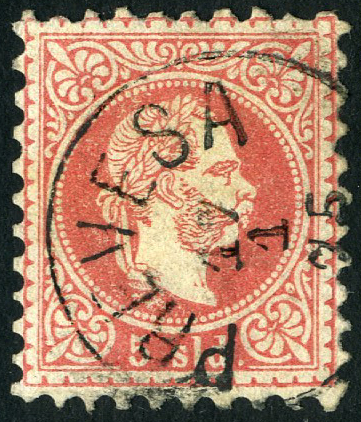
5 soldi, 1867 issue, cancelled at Preveza early in 1875

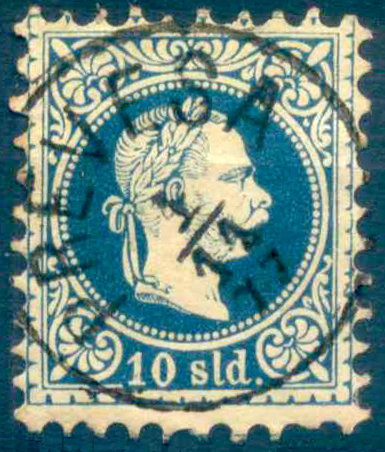
10 soldi, 1876–1883 issue, cancelled at Preveza in 1877

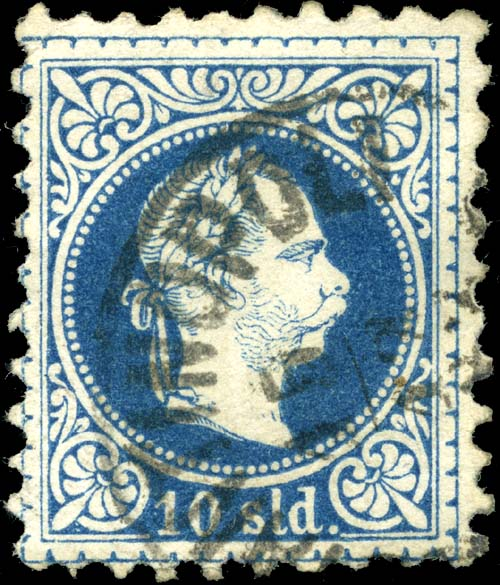
10 soldi, cancelled Costantinopoli Lloyd Istanbul in 1883

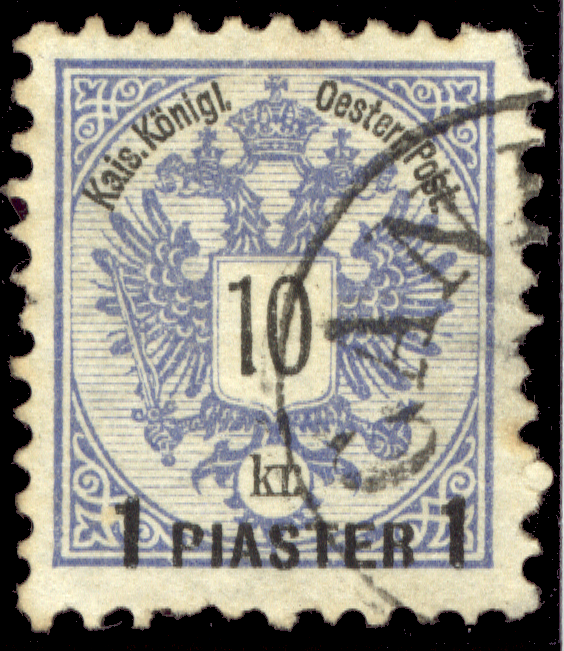
1888, 1 piaster overprinted, possibly used at Herakleion (Candia)

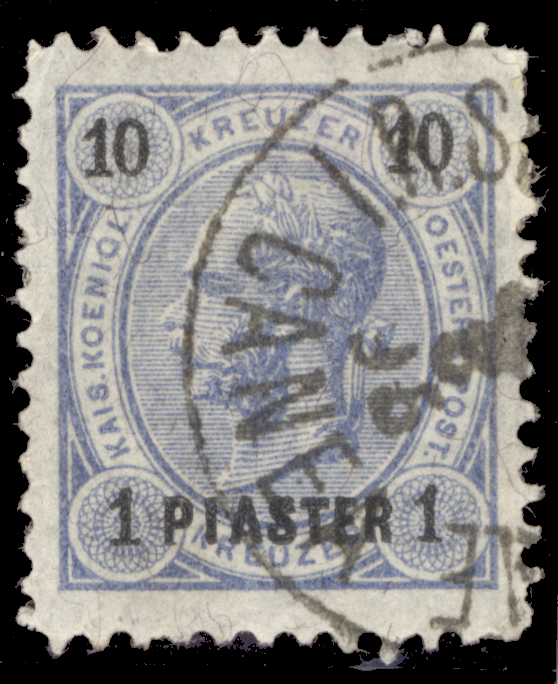
1 piaster overprinted, used at Canea in 1895

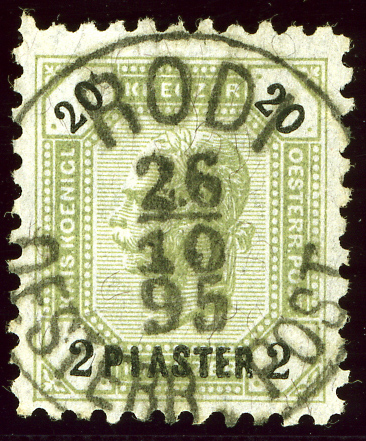
2 piasters at Rhodes in 1895

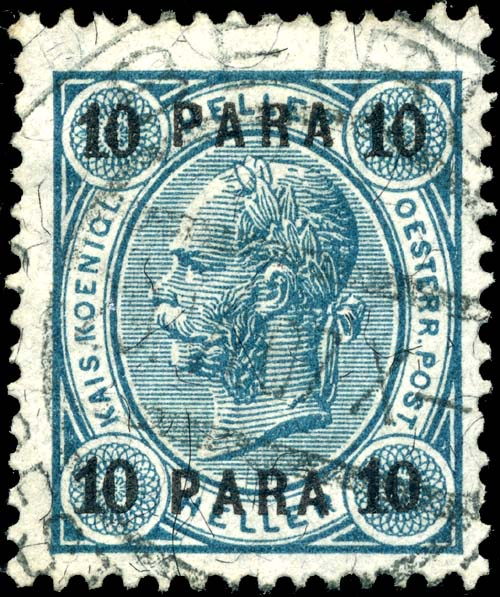
1906, 10 paras used at Beirut

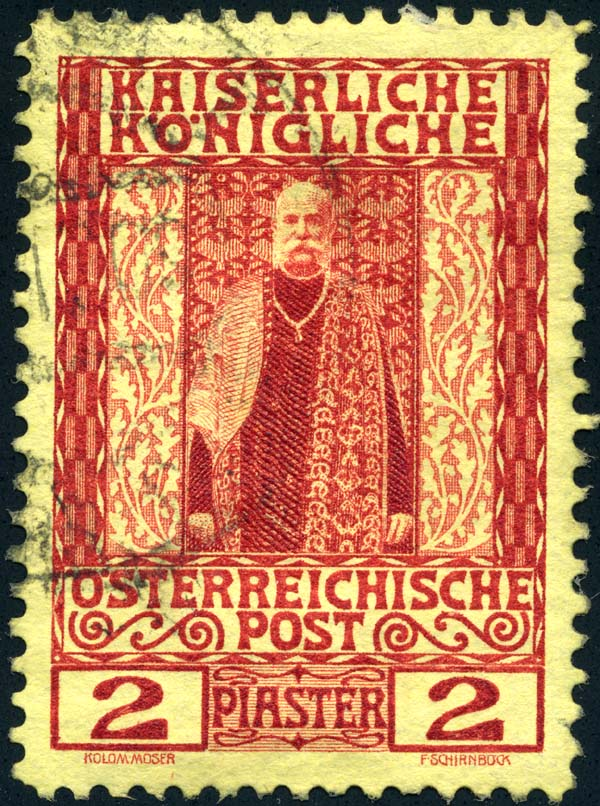
1908, 2 piasters

Some of the 1867–1883 soldi issues are rather common in unused state, contrary to the kreuzer equivalent. An extreme case is the 2 soldi yellow fine beard, lately issued in 1882: the ratio in value is 5000!

== Postal stationery ==
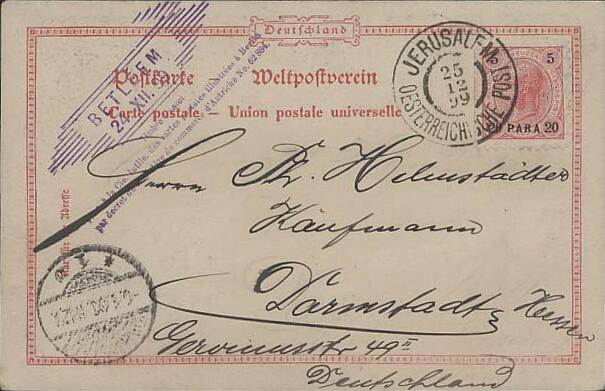
Austrian postcard sent Christmas 1899 from Bethlehem via Jerusalem to Germany

The first items of Postal stationery to be made available to Austrian post offices in the Turkish Empire were envelopes in 1863. A total of 10 different envelopes in soldi currency were issued up to 1877, these were valid for use till 31 October 1884. Only one envelope was ever issued in French currency in 1908 (5 Centesimi for Jerusalem).

Postal stationery postcards were first issued in 1873 in soldi currency, five different postcards were issued. Then in 1888 these were replaced by an issue in Turkish currency, a total of 13 different items were issued before these were replaced by postcards in French currency in 1903. A total of eight different postcards are known in French currency.

Only one 10 soldi lettercard was issued in 1886. Four different 1 Piaster lettercards were issued in 1888, 1890, 1900 and 1908.

During the period of Turkish currency three different newspaper wrappers were issued in 1899, 1900 and 1908. One newspaper 5 Centimes wrapper was issued in 1908 for Jerusalem.

== See also ==
- Postage stamps and postal history of Austria
- Austrian post offices in Crete
- Postage stamps and postal history of Palestine
- Stamps of the Levant on Wikimedia Commons

== References and sources ==
Sources

- Stanley Gibbons Ltd: various catalogues
- AskPhil – Glossary of Stamp Collecting Terms
- Encyclopaedia of Postal History
- Rossiter, Stuart & John Flower. The Stamp Atlas. London: Macdonald, 1986. ISBN 0-356-10862-7
- Shaw, Stanford J. & Shaw, Ezel Kural, History of the Ottoman Empire and Modern Turkey Volume 2, 1977, Cambridge University Press, ISBN 0-521-29166-6
