= Military in the media =

Representation of the military in media

Representations of the military in the media date from the beginnings of recorded history and since that time soldiers and armies have featured widely in popular culture.

== Classical antiquity ==
The Iliad, an ancient Greek epic poem in dactylic hexameters traditionally attributed to Homer, is set during the Trojan War, the ten-year siege of the city of Troy by a coalition of Greek states, and tells of the battles and events during the weeks of a quarrel between King Agamemnon and the warrior Achilles. The Odyssey, also ascribed to Homer, is, in part, a sequel to the Iliad, and is fundamental to the modern Western canon. The classical Greek writer Aristophanes, devoted an entire comedy, the Lysistrata, to a strike organised by military wives where they withhold sex from their husbands to prevent them from going to the Peloponnesian War. The Aeneid, written by Virgil between 29 and 19 BC, tells the legendary story of Aeneas, a Trojan who travelled to Italy, where he became the ancestor of the Romans.

== Middle Ages ==
In Medieval Europe, tales of knighthood and chivalry, the officer class of the period, captured the popular imagination. Writers and poets like Taliesin, Chrétien de Troyes, and Thomas Malory wrote tales of derring-do featuring Arthur, Guinevere, Lancelot, and Galahad. Even in the 21st century, books and films about the Arthurian legend and the Holy Grail continuing to appear.

A century or so later, in the hands of writers such as Jean Froissart, Miguel de Cervantes, and William Shakespeare, the fictional knight Tirant lo Blanch and the real-life condottiero John Hawkwood would be juxtaposed against the fantastical Don Quixote and the carousing Sir John Falstaff. In just one play, Henry V, Shakespeare provides a whole range of military characters, from cool-headed and clear-sighted generals, to captains, and common soldiery. Ludovico Ariosto's romance epic, Orlando Furioso (1516), is a continuation of Matteo Maria Boiardo's Orlando Innamorato, which describes the adventures of Charlemagne, Orlando, and the Franks as they battle against the Saracens with diversions into many sideplots. Torquato Tasso's poem Jerusalem Delivered (La Gerusalemme liberata, 1580), depicts a highly imaginative version of the combats between Christians and Muslims at the end of the First Crusade, during the siege of Jerusalem.

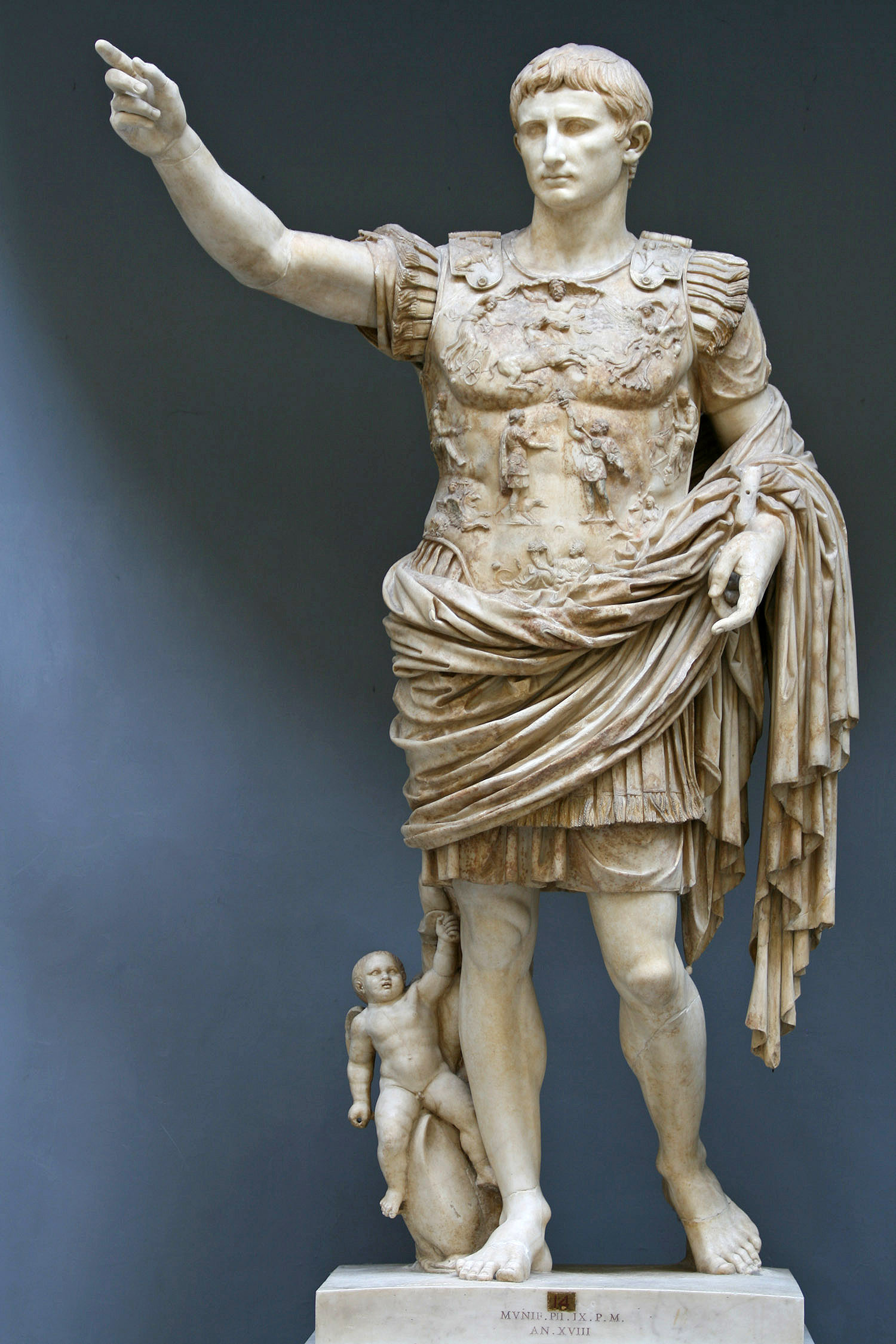
Emperor Augustus Caesar in a martial pose (1st century)

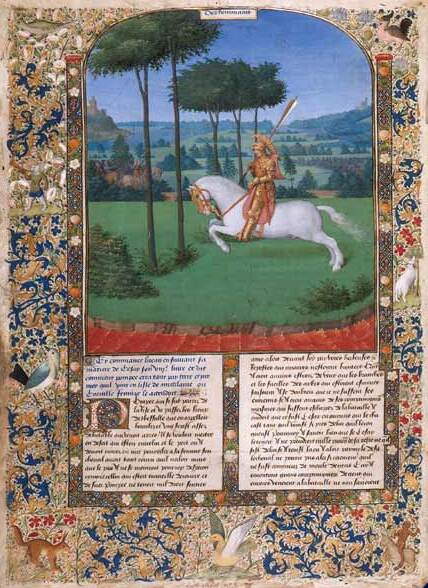
The Flight of Pompey after Pharsalus, by Jean Fouquet

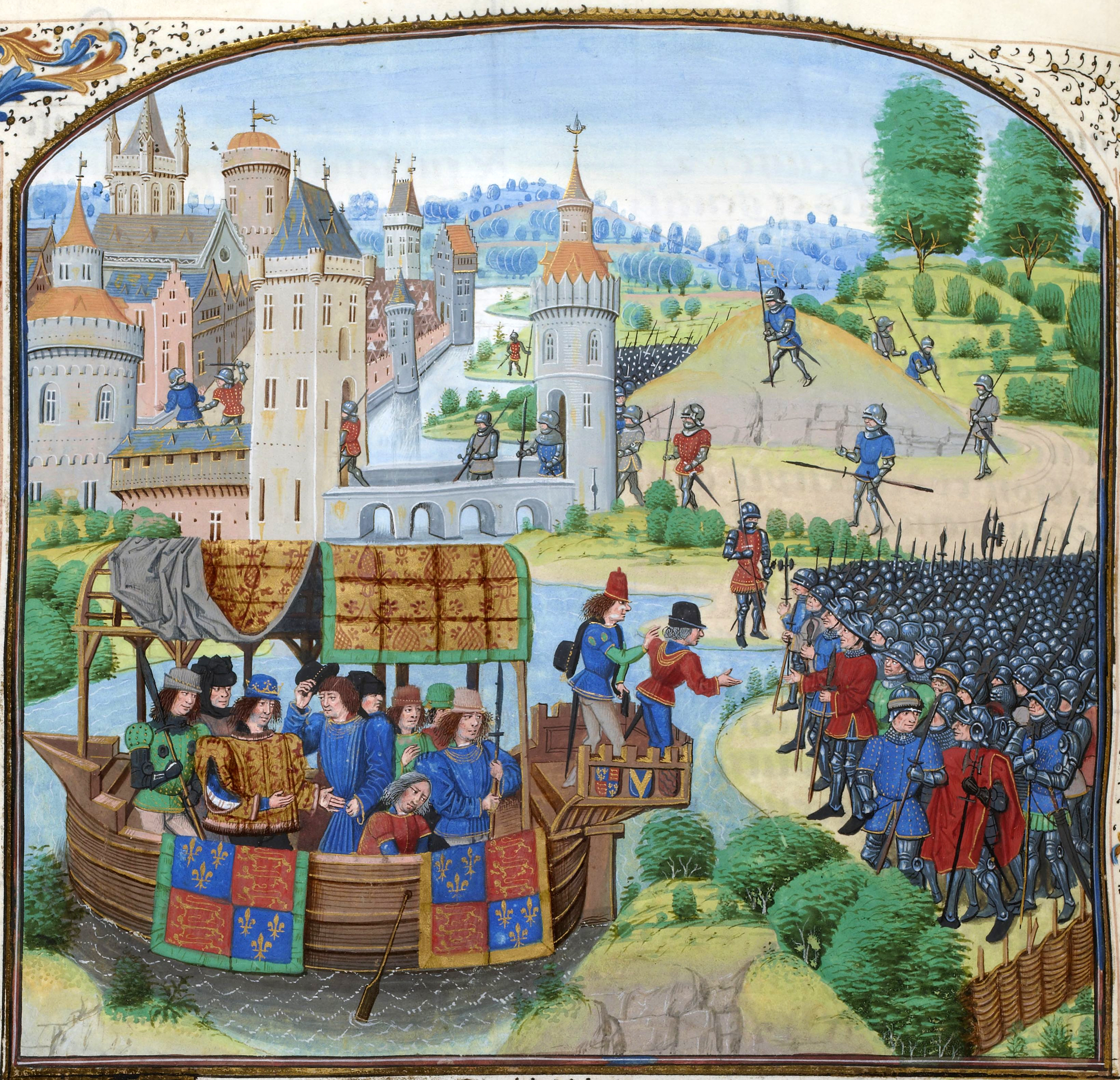
Medieval view: Richard II of England meets rebels

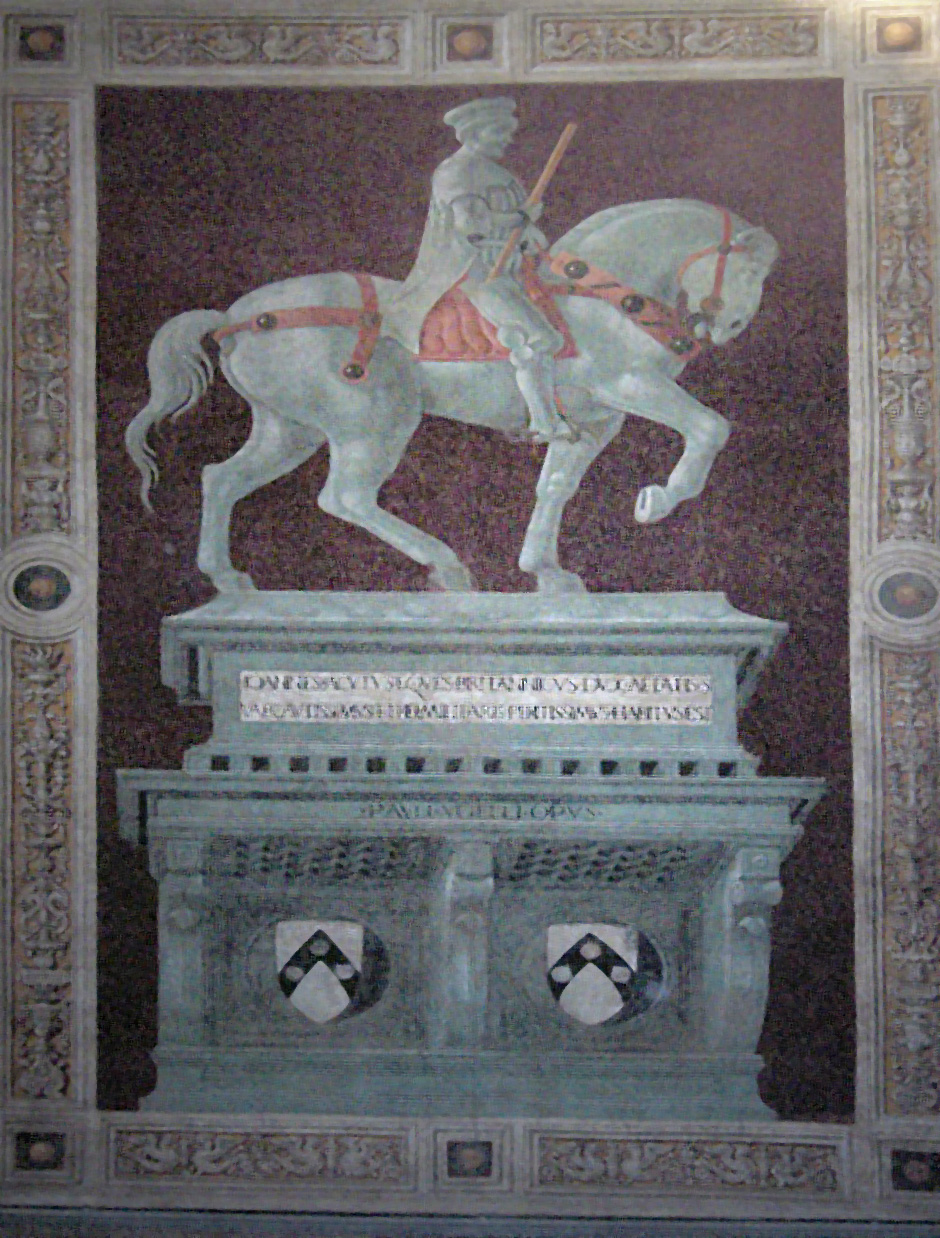
Sir John Hawkwood (fresco in the Duomo, Florence)

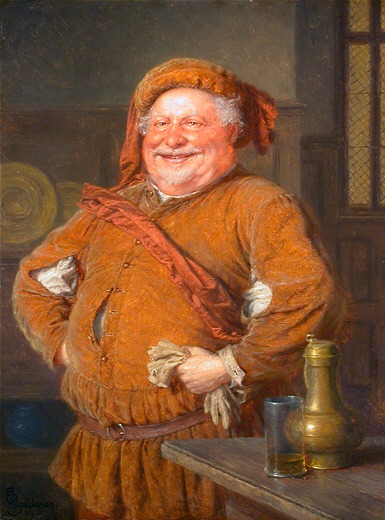
Shakespeare's Sir John Falstaff by Eduard von Grützner

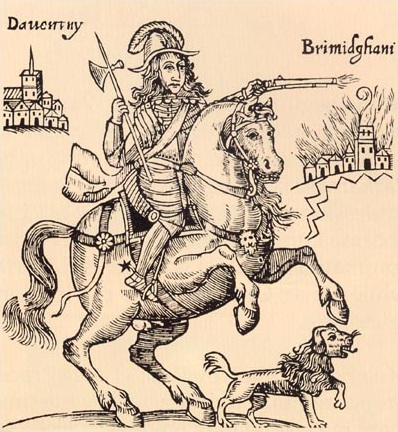
"The Cruel Practices of Prince Rupert" (1643)

== Early modern period ==
The rapid growth of movable type in the late 16th and early 17th centuries saw an upsurge in private publication. Political pamphlets became popular, often lampooning military leaders for political purposes. A pamphlet directed against Prince Rupert of the Rhine is a typical example. During the 19th century, irreverence towards authority was at its height and for every elegant military gentleman painted by the master-portraitists of the European courts for example, Thomas Gainsborough, Francisco Goya, and Joshua Reynolds, there are the sometimes affectionate and sometimes savage caricatures of Thomas Rowlandson and William Hogarth.

This continued in the 20th century, with publications like Punch in the British Empire and Le Fils du Père Duchêne in France, poking fun at the military establishment. This extended to media other print also. An enduring example is the Major-General's Song from the Gilbert and Sullivan light opera, The Pirates of Penzance, where a senior army officer is satirised for his enormous fund of irrelevant knowledge.

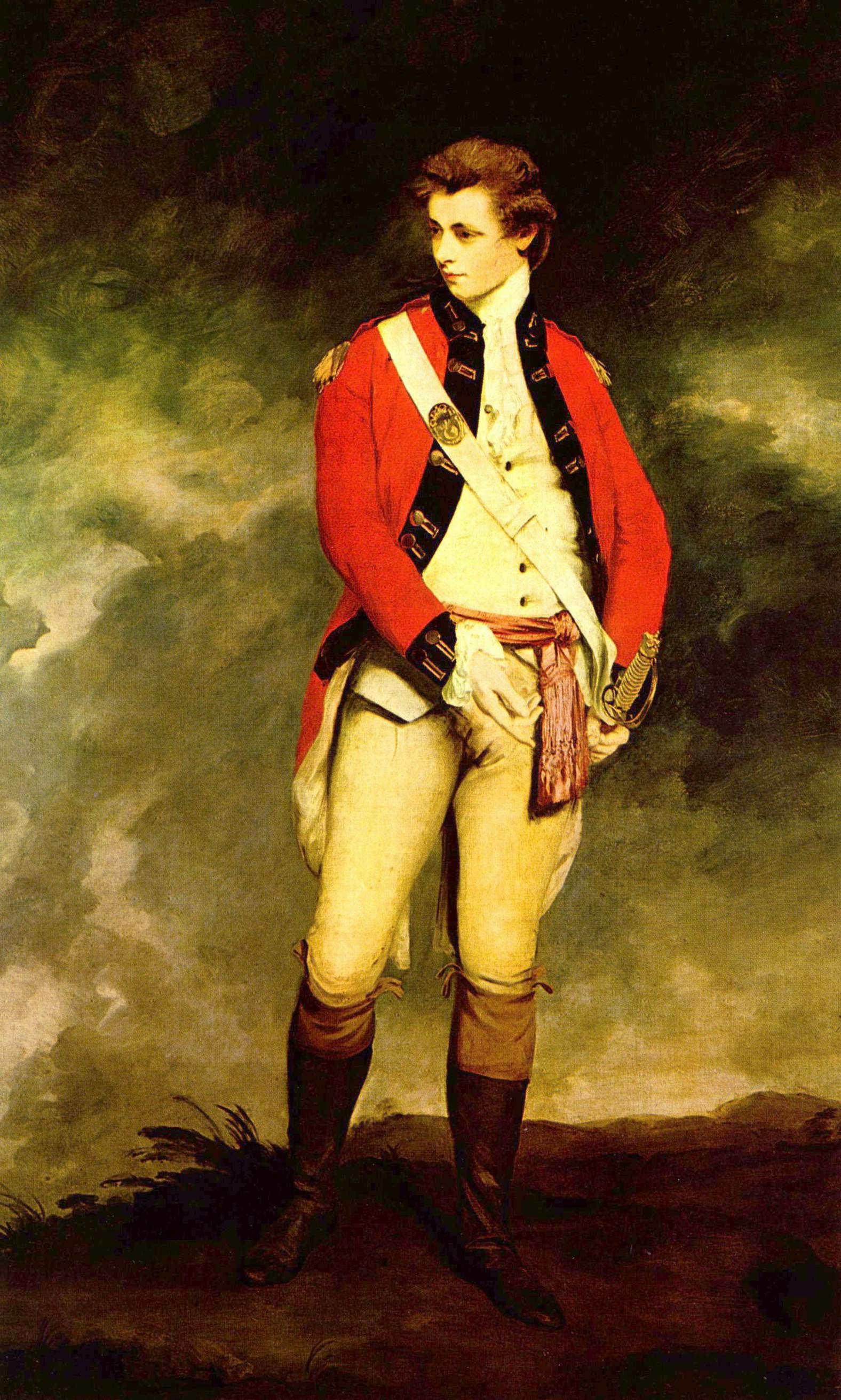
Colonel John Hayes St. Leger (detail) by Sir Joshua Reynolds

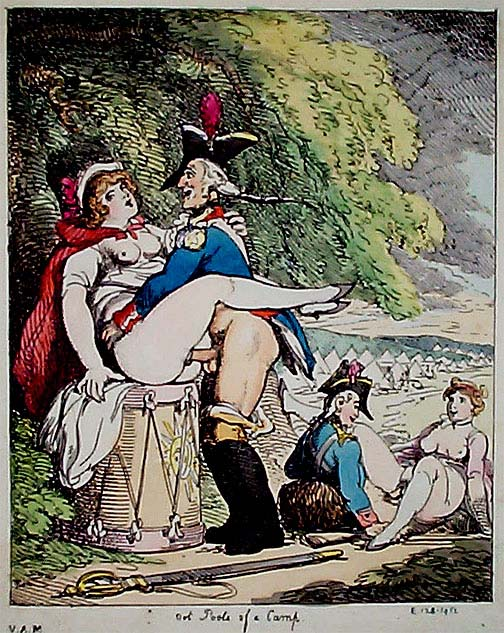
Rowlandson often satirised the military

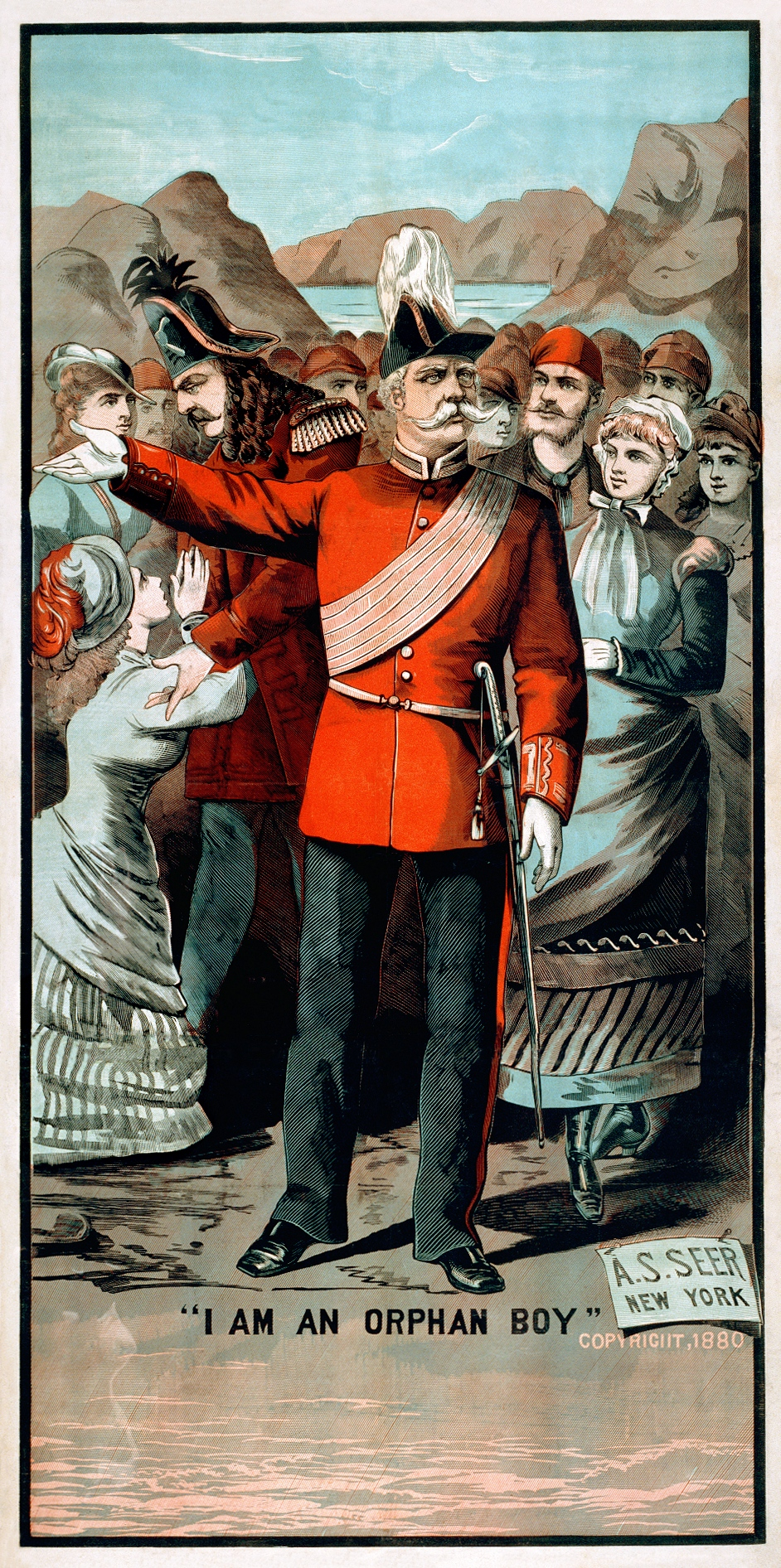
"A modern major general" (The Pirates of Penzance)

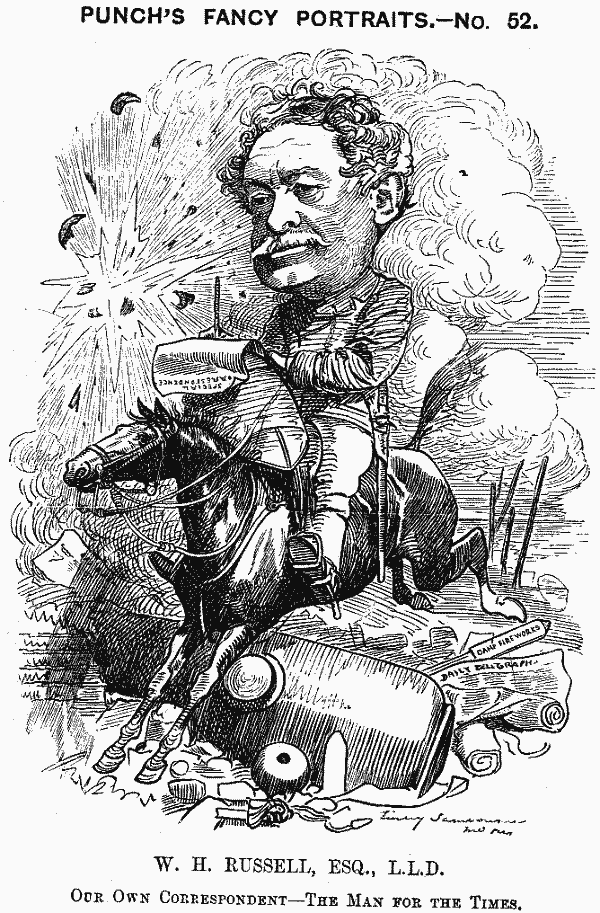
Punch: war reporter, W H Russell, Crimean War

== Modern era ==
The increasing importance of cinema in the early 20th century provided a new platform for depictions of military subjects. During the First World War, although heavily censored, newsreels enabled those at home to see for themselves a heavily sanitized version of life at the front line. About the same time, both pro-war and anti-war films came to the silver screen. One of the first films on military aviation, Hell's Angels broke all box office records on its release in 1929. Soon, war films of all types were showing throughout the world, notably those of Charlie Chaplin who actively promoted war bonds and voluntary enlistment.

The First World War was also responsible for a new kind of military depiction, through poetry. Hitherto, poetry had been used mostly to glorify or sanctify war. The Charge of the Light Brigade by Alfred, Lord Tennyson, with its galloping hoofbeat rhythm, is a prime late Victorian example of this, though Rudyard Kipling had written a scathing reply, The Last of the Light Brigade, criticising the poverty in which many Light Brigade veterans found themselves in old age. Instead, the new wave of poetry, from the war poets, was written from the point of view of the disenchanted trench soldier.

Leading war poets included: Siegfried Sassoon, Wilfred Owen, John McCrae, Rupert Brooke, Isaac Rosenberg, and David Jones. A similar movement occurred in literature, producing a slew of novels on both sides of the Atlantic including notably All Quiet on the Western Front and Johnny Got His Gun. The 1963 English stage musical Oh, What a Lovely War! provided a satirical take on World War I, which was released in a cinematic version directed by Richard Attenborough in 1969.

The propaganda war that accompanied World War II invariably depicted the enemy in unflattering terms. The United States, Soviet Union, and Nazi Germany excelled in producing heroic images, placing their soldiers in a semi-mythical context. Examples of this exist not only in posters but also in the films of Leni Riefenstahl and Sergei Eisenstein.

Alongside this, World War II also inspired films as varied as The Bridge on the River Kwai, The Longest Day, Catch-22, Saving Private Ryan, and The Sea Shall Not Have Them. The next major event, the Korean War inspired a long-running television series M*A*S*H. With the Vietnam War, the tide of balance turned and its films, notably Apocalypse Now, Good Morning, Vietnam, Go Tell the Spartans. and Born on the Fourth of July, have tended to contain critical messages.

There's a nursery rhyme about war, The Grand Old Duke of York, ridiculing a general for his inability to command any further than marching his men up and down a hill. The number of songs focusing on war include "And the Band Played Waltzing Matilda" and "Universal Soldier".

Uncle Sam recruiting poster (1916-1917).

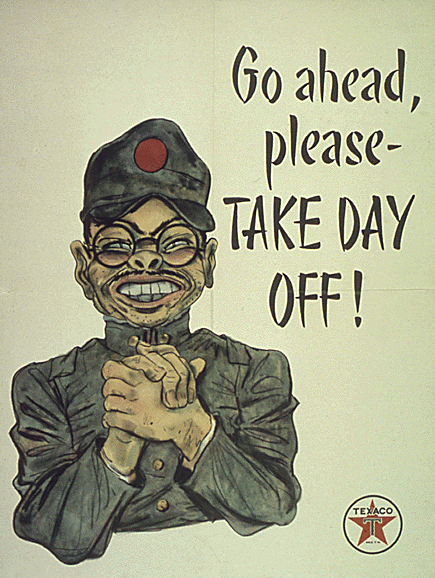
Caricature Japanese soldier in a US propaganda poster

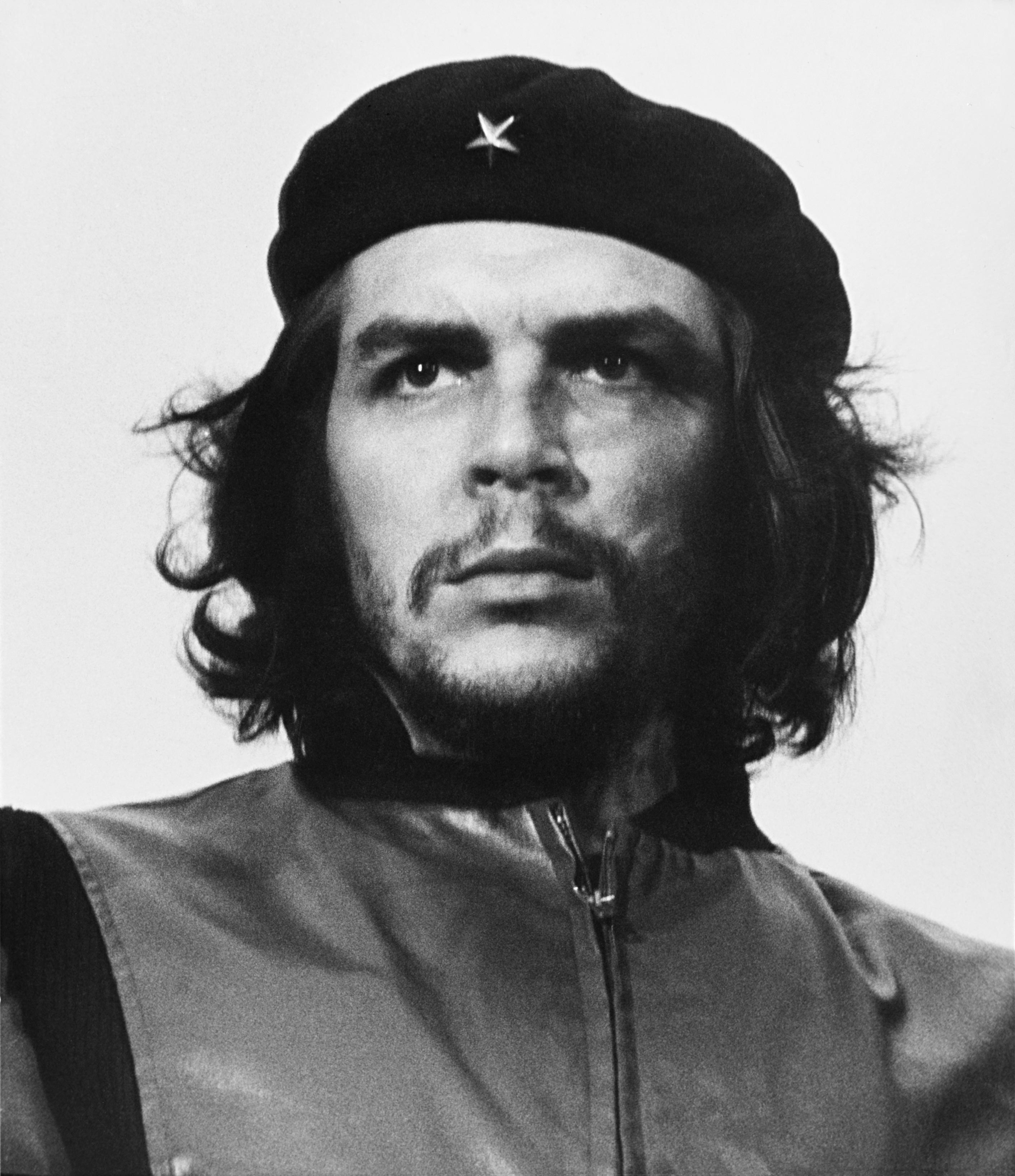
Popularized cropped version of Guerrillero Heroico, a photo by Alberto Korda (March 5, 1960, Havana)

Guerilla structure

Although some groups engaged in combat, such as resistance movements, all refer to themselves using military terminology, notably "Army", "Brigade", or "Front", none have had the structure of a national military to justify the reference, and usually have had to rely on support of outside national militaries.
