= Austrian Post =

Company responsible for postal service in Austria

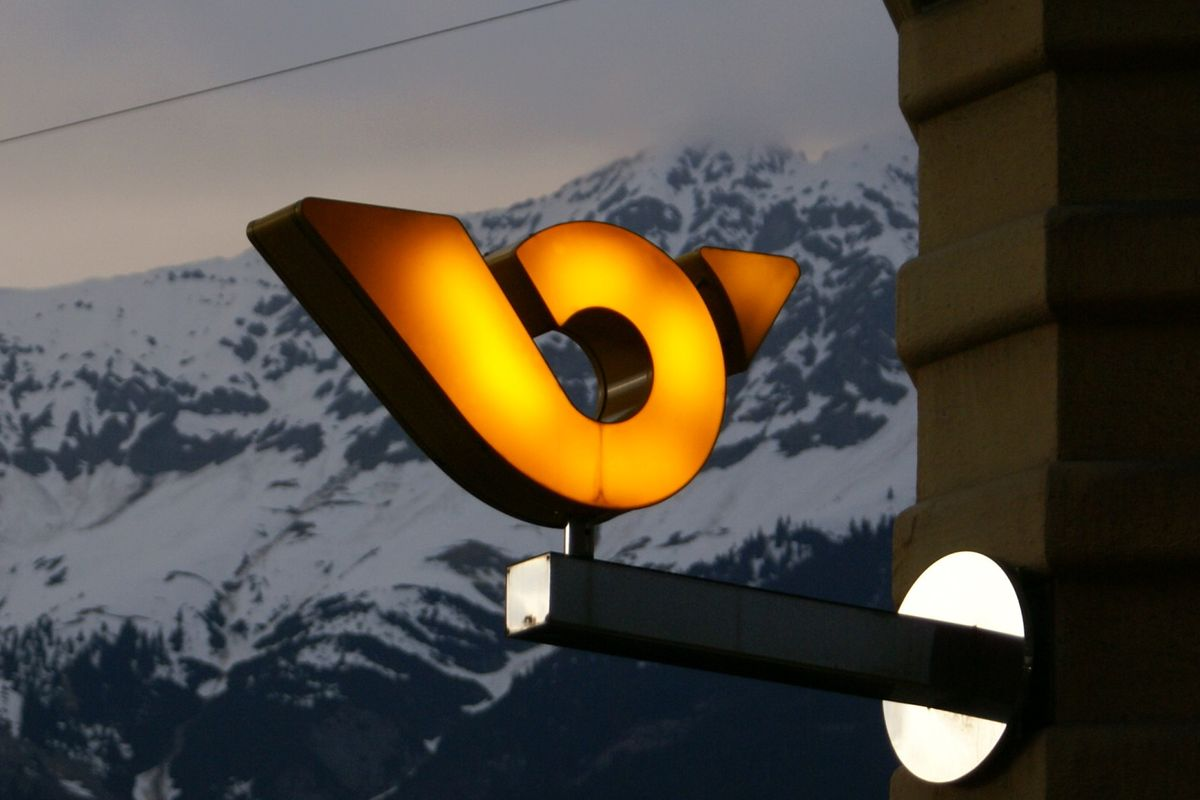
- Native name: Österreichische Post Aktiengesellschaft
- Type: Aktiengesellschaft
- Traded as: WBAG: POST; ATX component
- Industry: Postal services, Courier
- Founded: 1999
- Headquarters: Vienna, Austria
- Key people: Walter Oblin (CEO); Elisabeth Stadler (chairwoman of the supervisory board)
- Products: Express, package and mail delivery services
- Revenue: €1.939 billion (2017)
- Net income: €165 million (2017)
- Total assets: €1.674 billion (2017)
- Total equity: €698 million (2017)
- Number of employees: 20,500 (2017)
- Website: post.at/en

The Austrian Post (German: Österreichische Post Aktiengesellschaft) is a company that provides postal service in Austria. It was established in 1999 after a split-off from the state-owned PTT agency Post und Telekom Austria AG and is listed on the Vienna Stock Exchange.

== History ==
The first standardised postal service was set up between Innsbruck and Mechelen, Belgium in 1490. By 1563 an extensive system of mail routes existed connecting Vienna with cities in Belgium, France, Italy, Spain and Portugal. In 1722 In Emperor Charles VI made the postal service a government monopoly and by the mid-18th century passenger carrying mail coach service began.

During the 1800s letter boxes, money orders, cash-on-delivery services were introduced and a pneumatic mail system was set up in Vienna in 1875.

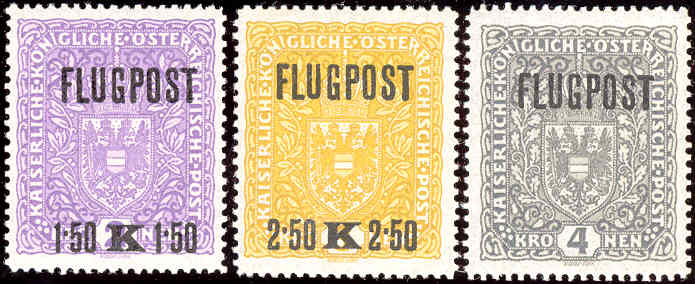
Austrian stamps overprinted "FLUGPOST" for the 1918 Vienna, Kraków and Lviv flights

The first regular international airmail route between Vienna, Kraków and Lviv was established on March 31, 1918, and terminated on October 15. Three definitive stamps were overprinted "FLUGPOST" for this flight and showed that a regular airmail delivery was feasible even during wartime. Many philatelists consider this regular post delivery with aeroplanes to be the actual start of airmail history.

Postal codes were introduced nationwide in 1966.

=== Philately ===
Though not in general use until 80 years later, the first postmarks were introduced in 1787 by Georg Khumer, a postmaster in Friesach identifying time and place of use, and Austria's first postage stamps were issued in 1850.

== Services ==
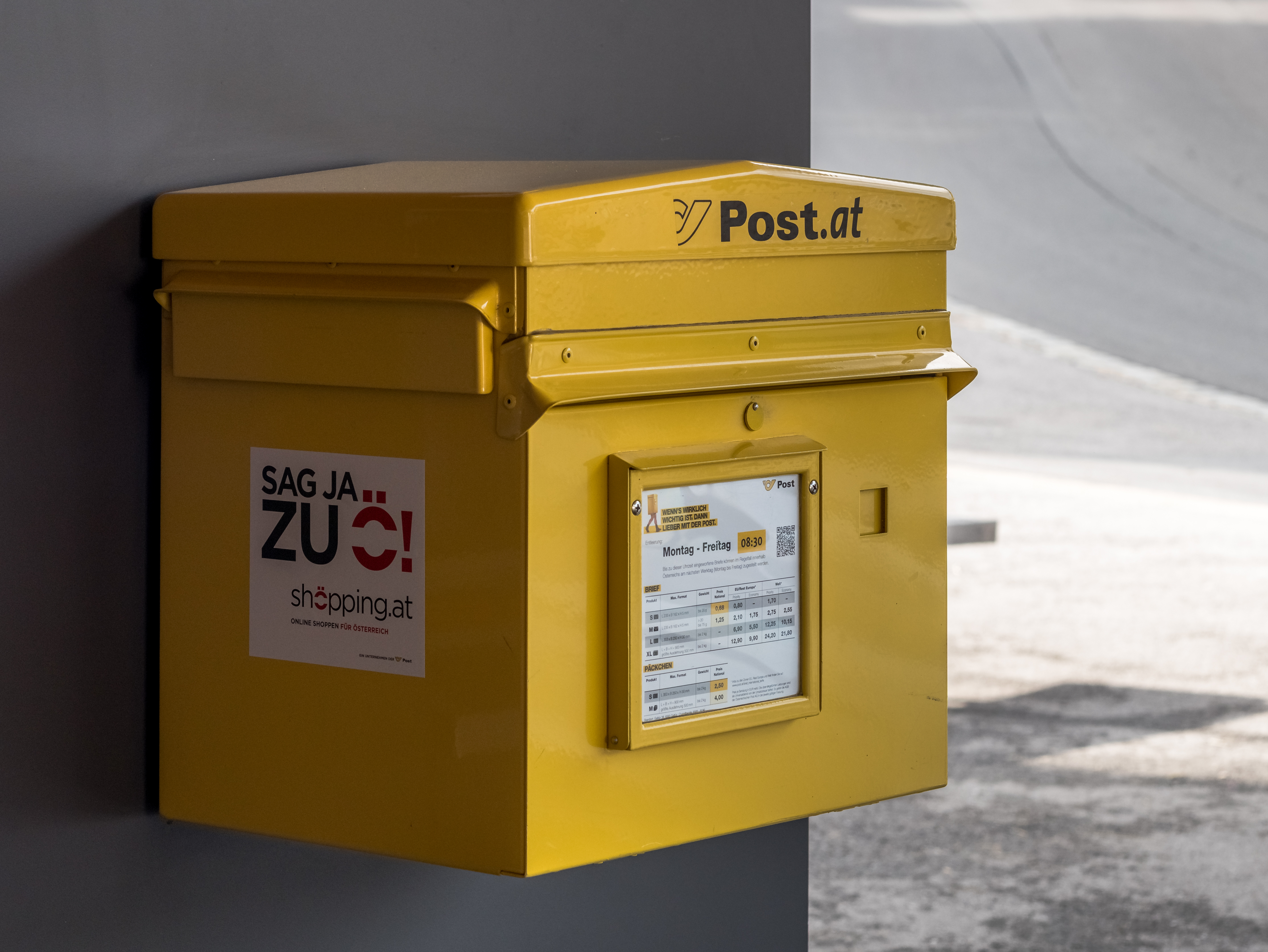
Post box in Galtür. Paznaun, Tyrol, Austria

Since 1986 the Austrian Post started Express mail services and is an EMS Cooperative contracted delivery agent within the UPU.

In April 2020, the Austrian Post launched bank99, a credit institution that offers online services as well as personal customer support at around 1,800 service points throughout Austria. The Austrian Post owns 80% of the bank's shares, while a 20% stake is held by CAPITAL BANK – GRAWE GRUPPE AG. Post offices and postal service partners serve as distribution channels, which allows bank99 to potentially provide financial services for 99% percent of the Austrian population, closing supply gaps in rural areas.

Bank99 offers checking accounts for private customers, services for national and international financial transactions, and credit cards. Secure international money transfers are carried out in partnership with Ria Money transfer. The company has positioned itself in opposition to direct banks, offering personal services through a network of physical locations.

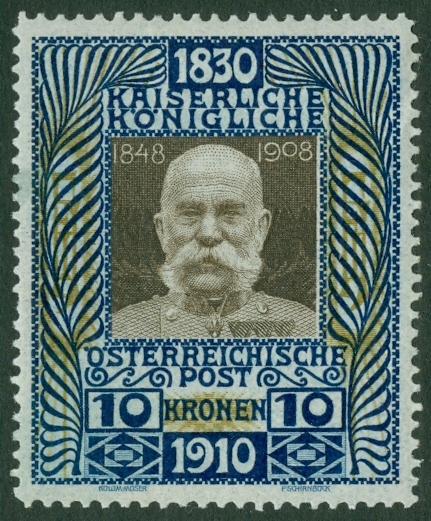
Stamp of the emperor Franz Joseph I of Austria issued on the occasion of his 80th birthday, re-issued in a similar design, in 2016 on the 100th anniversary of his death

== Controversy ==
In 2019, Austria's data protection authority imposed a fine of 18 million euros ($20 million) on the Austrian Post for illegally using customers’ data, such as ages and addresses, to calculate a probability of which political party they might support and sell its findings.

== See also ==
- Austrian post offices in Crete
- Austrian post offices in Liechtenstein
- Austrian post offices in the Ottoman Empire
- Postage stamps and postal history of Austria
- Postal codes in Austria
