= Journeyman papers =

Certification granted to tradesmen

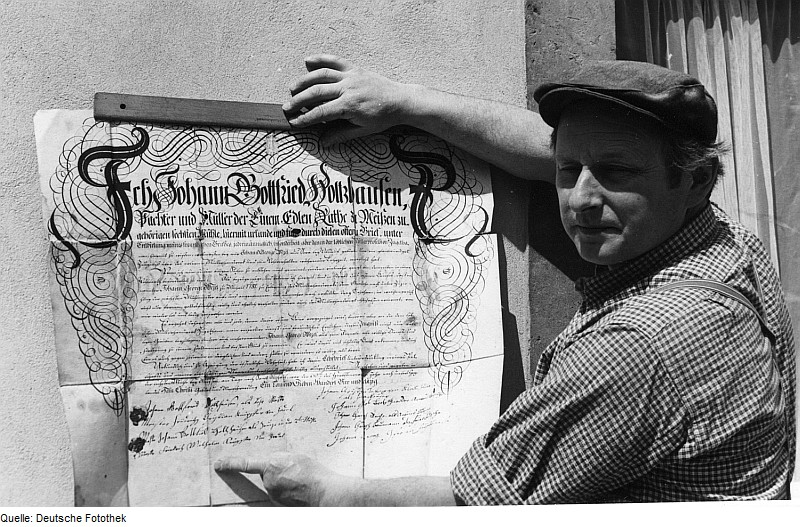
A master miller displays an antique journeyman's licence in Meissen, 1981.

Journeyman papers, or a journeyman's licence, is a certification granted to tradesmen upon completion of an apprenticeship. The certificate verifies that the worker is skilled in their trade. A tradesmen who has received this certification is referred to as a journeyman.

Until the modern era, journeymen papers were essential for finding work as a tradesman. The qualifications of journeymen have varied over the centuries. In present day U.S., a journeyman has to pass a board certified test, and is then licensed.

== See also ==
- Master craftsman
- Guild
