= FAD dependent oxidoreductase family =

FAD dependent oxidoreductase
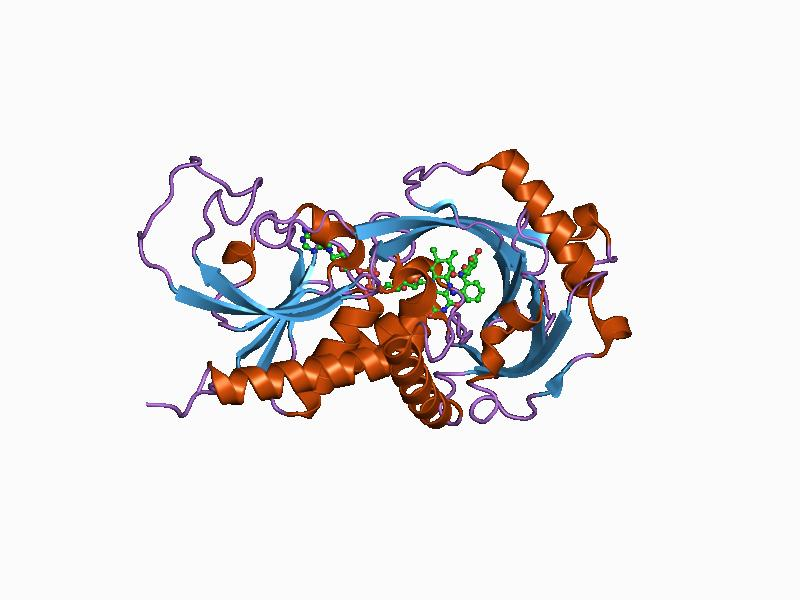
- crystal structure of d-amino acid oxidase in complex with two anthranylate molecules

Identifiers
- Symbol: DAO
- Pfam: PF01266
- Pfam clan: CL0063
- InterPro: IPR006076
- PROSITE: PDOC00753
- SCOP2: 1kif / SCOPe / SUPFAM
- Membranome: 249
Available protein structures:
- PDB: IPR006076 PF01266 (ECOD; PDBsum)
- AlphaFold: IPR006076; PF01266

In molecular biology, the FAD dependent oxidoreductase family of proteins is a family of FAD dependent oxidoreductases. Members of this family include Glycerol-3-phosphate dehydrogenase EC 1.1.99.5, Sarcosine oxidase beta subunit EC 1.5.3.1, D-amino-acid dehydrogenase EC 1.4.99.1, D-aspartate oxidase EC 1.4.3.1.

D-amino acid oxidase EC 1.4.3.3 (DAMOX or DAO) is an FAD flavoenzyme that catalyses the oxidation of neutral and basic D-amino acids into their corresponding keto acids. DAOs have been characterised and sequenced in fungi and vertebrates where they are known to be located in the peroxisomes.

D-aspartate oxidase EC 1.4.3.1 (DASOX) is an enzyme, structurally related to DAO, which catalyses the same reaction but is active only toward dicarboxylic D-amino acids. In DAO, a conserved histidine has been shown to be important for the enzyme's catalytic activity.

== See also ==
- DAO
- D-amino-acid dehydrogenase
- D-amino acid oxidase
- D-aspartate oxidase
- Glycerol-3-phosphate dehydrogenase
- Sarcosine oxidase
