= DDO =

DDO may refer to:

== Science and technology ==
- D-aspartate oxidase, encoded by the DDO gene
- David Dunlap Observatory
  - David Dunlap Observatory Catalogue
- Distant detached object, a type of minor planet
- Dynamic drive overlay, a software technique to extend a system BIOS

== Titles ==
- Deputy Director for Operations, of the United States Central Intelligence Agency
- Diocesan Director of Ordinands, in the Church of England

== Other uses ==
- Dollard-des-Ormeaux, a suburb of Montreal
- Dungeons & Dragons Online, a massively multiplayer online role-playing game
- Tsez language
