= Postage stamps and postal history of the Danish West Indies =

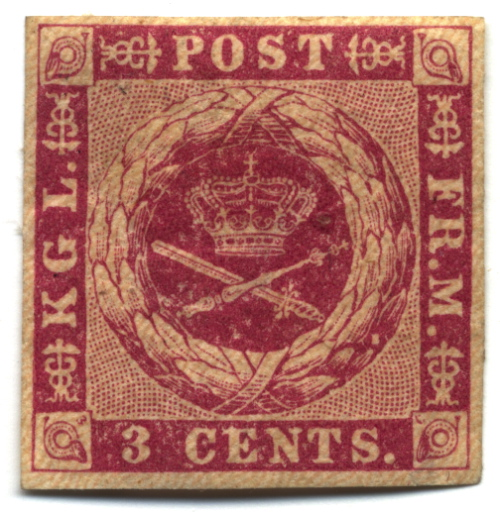
3 cent stamp, 1866

St Thomas was a hub of the West Indies packet service from 1851 to 1885. Initially mail was transported by a Spanish packet to and from Puerto Rico; but in July 1867 the British picked up the mail contract, and packet letters are known using British stamps as late as 1879.

== First stamps ==
The first postage stamp of the Danish West Indies was issued in 1856. It had the same square coat of arms design as the contemporary stamps of Denmark, but it was denominated 3 cents and of a dark carmine color on yellowish paper. A yellow burelage of wavy lines covered the stamp. (In the illustration at right, it is most easily seen along the bottom edge of the larger version.) An 1866 printing was on white paper, with the direction of the burelage lines changed, and in 1872 the stamps were perforated. In 1873 a 4c value in dull blue was issued.

1874 saw the first numeral issues of the same sort as used in Denmark. Values ranged from 1c to 50c; all were bi-colored. Inverted frames are common for several of the lower values.

As usual for small colonies far away, the Danish West Indies ran out of popular values periodically, and the colonial administration had to improvise. A 1c surcharge was printed on 7c stamps in 1887, and a 10c surcharge on 50c in 1895. An additional supply of numeral types in new colors came out between 1896 and 1901.

Single-color 1c and 5c stamps were issued in 1900 to meet UPU regulations. Shortages of 2c and 8c values led to more surcharges in 1902, rectified in the following year by an issue of those values using the arms design of 1900. Postage due stamps first appeared in 1902 also.

== Currency reform ==
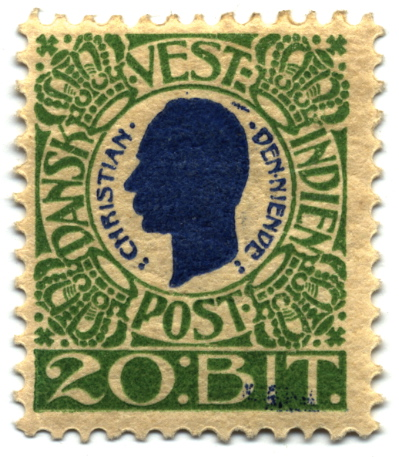
20 bit stamp, 1905

As a result of the currency reform, in 1905, new stamps were issued. Values from 5b to 50b had a silhouette of King Christian IX, while 1fr, 2fr, and 5fr depicted the sailing ship Ingolf in St. Thomas harbor. New postage dues were required as well. Additional 5b stamps were produced by surcharging older stamps.

A definitive series of 1907 depicted Frederik VIII, followed in 1915 by a series for Christian X.

A few types are cheaply available today, such as the low values of the 1907 issue, but most fall into the US$10-20 range. Because the letter-writing population was very small, perhaps just a few hundred persons, used copies are often valued more highly by collectors, and both forged and favor cancellations are known to have been made.

When the islands were sold to the United States in 1917 and renamed the United States Virgin Islands, the colony ceased producing its own postage stamps.

== Gallery ==
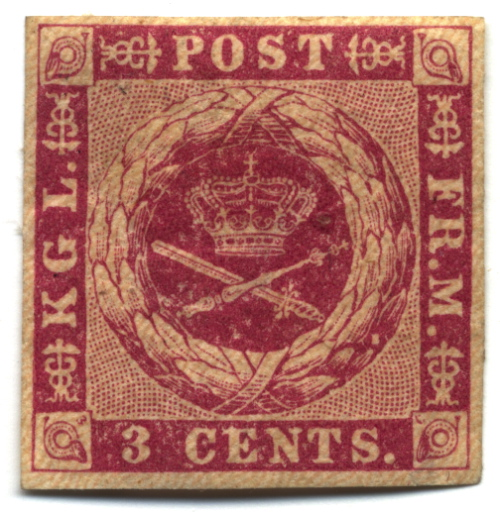
Stamp Danish West Indies 3 Cent 1866

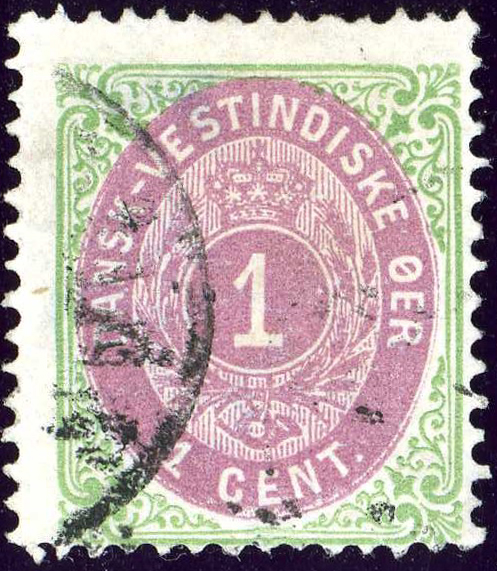
Stamp Danish West Indies 1 Cent 1873

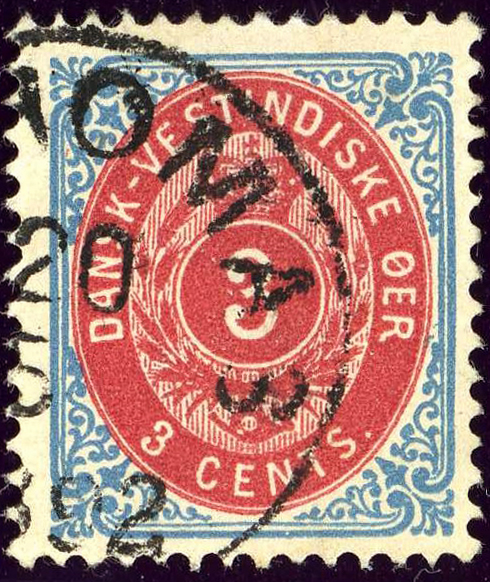
Stamp Danish West Indies 3 Cent 1873

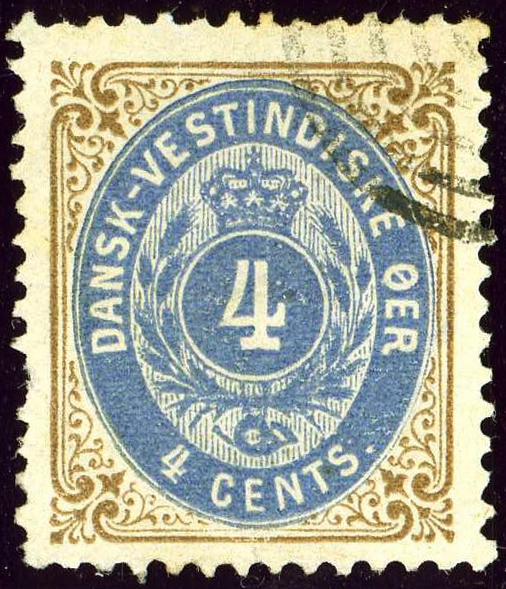
Stamp Danish West Indies 4 Cent 1873

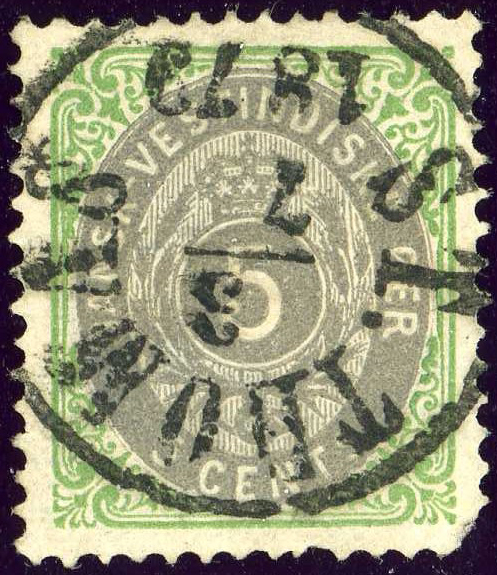
Stamp Danish West Indies 5 Cent 1876

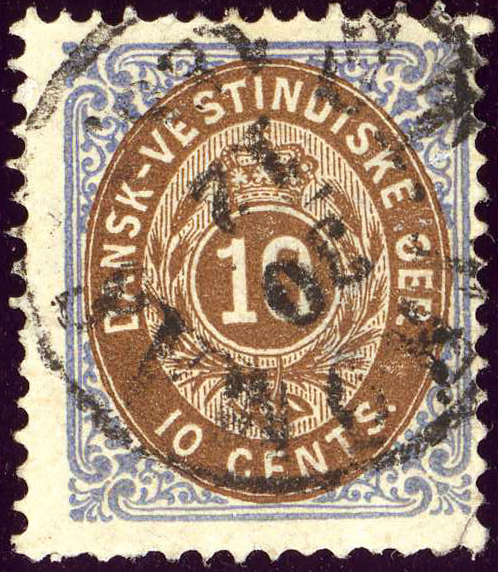
Stamp Danish West Indies 10 Cent 1876

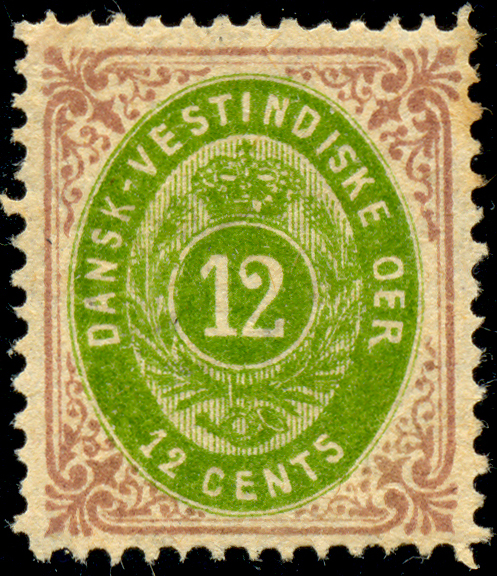
Stamp Danish West Indies 12 Cent 1893

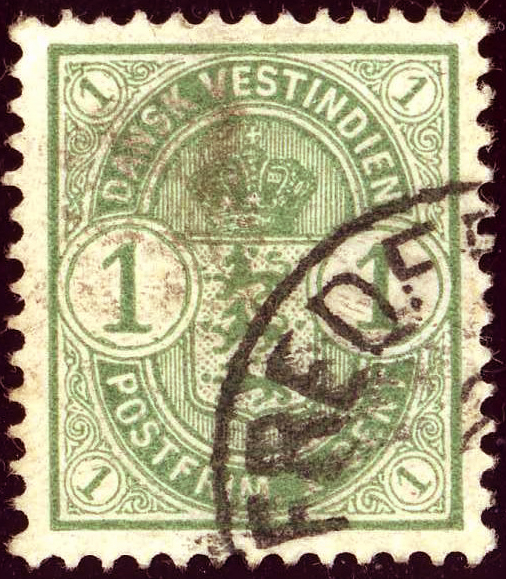
Stamp Danish West Indies 1 Cent 1900

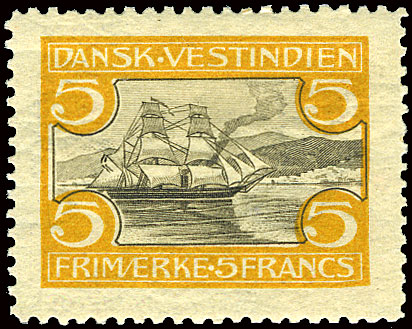
Stamp Danish West Indies 5 Cent 1905

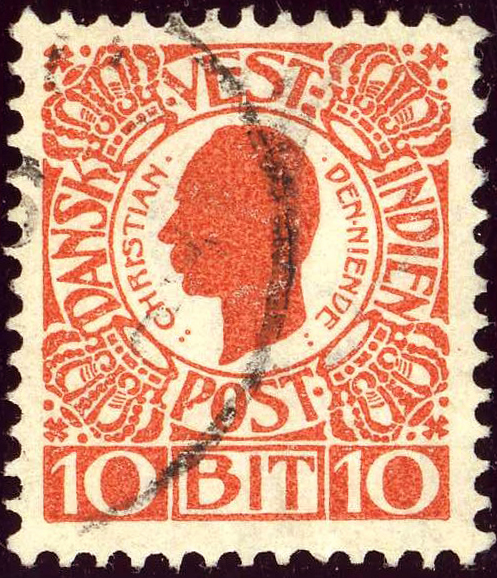
Stamp Danish West Indies 10 Cent 10 Bit 1905

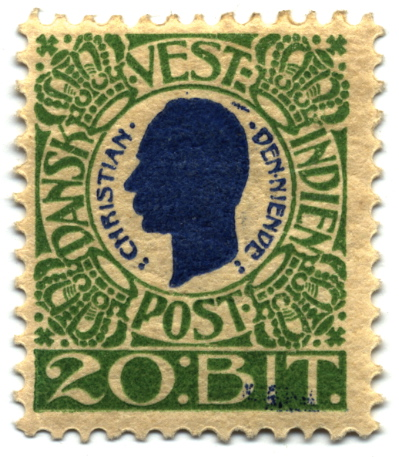
Stamp Danish West Indies 20 Bit 1905

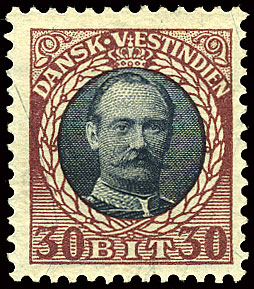
Stamp Danish West Indies 30 Bit 1908

== See also ==
Postage stamps and postal history of Denmark
