= G72 =

G72 may refer to

- D-amino acid oxidase activator
- G72 Quanzhou–Nanning Expressway
