= PostNord Logistics =

Nordic logistics company

PostNord Logistics is a logistics company in the Nordics. The business has its roots in Denmark, Finland, Norway and Sweden. The business was formed through the mergers of the Danish and Swedish postal operators and private sector companies. PostNord Logistics is one of four PostNord Group companies. In 2013 the group's logistics operations, formerly consisting of 16 Nordic region companies, were gathered under a common brand – PostNord Logistics.

PostNord Logistics has terminals in Germany as well as 5,000 service points and 120 terminals throughout the Nordic region. The business has 8,000 employees, including 4,550 drivers. A total volume of 500,000 parcels and 60,000 pallets of goods are transported every day.

PostNord Logistics has sales of SEK 16,000m (2013). The CEO of PostNord is Håkan Ericsson and the Chairman is Jens Moberg.

== Company timeline ==
- In 2013, Nordisk Kyl Logistik and Transbothnia were acquired.
- In 2012, Swedish company Green Cargo Logistics and Norwegian companies Harlem Transport and Byrknes Auto were acquired.
- In 2011, Swedish company Nils Hansson Logistics was acquired.
- In May 2011, the Group was renamed PostNord AB.
- On 24 June 2009, Post Danmark A/S and Posten AB merged to provide cross-border communication and logistics services.

== Included companies, by country ==
=== Sweden ===
- Transbothnia
- Nordisk Kyl Logistik AB
- Nils Hansson
- Posten Logistik Ab
- Green Cargo TPL

=== Norway ===
- Mereco
- Eek
- Byrknes Auto
- Harlem Transport
- Tollpost Globe

=== Denmark ===
- Budstikken
- HIT
- Transportgruppen

=== Finland ===
- Posten Logistik Oy
- DPD Finland
