= Dao (disambiguation) =

Dao, Dão or DAO may refer to:

== Chinese philosophy ==
- Tao (Chinese: "The Way" 道), a philosophical concept

== Arts and entertainment ==
- Dao (1995 film), a Hong Kong wuxia film by Tsui Hark
- Dao (2026 film), a French/Senegalese/Guinea-Bissau drama film by Alain Gomis
- Dao (game), an abstract strategy game
- DAO (album), a 1996 album by jazz saxophonist David S. Ware

== People and language ==
- Yao people (Asia), a minority ethnic group of Vietnam
- Dao language (Papuan), Indonesia
- Dao language (China)
- Dao (surname) (Đào), a Vietnamese surname
- Dao (Dungeons & Dragons), a type of genie in the game Dungeons & Dragons
- Dão (footballer) (born 1984), Brazilian football defender

== Places ==
- Dao (country subdivision) (Dào), historical political divisions in China translated as "circuits"
- Dao (state), a historical state during the Zhou dynasty
- Dao, Capiz, Philippines
- Dao County, in Yongzhou, Hunan, China
- Dão DOC, a wine region in Portugal
- Dão River, a river in Portugal

== Science and technology ==
=== Biology ===
- D-amino acid oxidase, a peroxisomal enzyme encoded by the gene DAO
- Diamine oxidase, an enzyme, also known as histaminase, involved in the metabolism of histamine
- D-aspartate oxidase, in enzymology
- Dracontomelon dao, a species of tropical canopy tree known as dao in Filipino

=== Computing ===
- Data access object, a design pattern used in object-oriented software engineering
- Jet Data Access Objects, a general programming interface for database access on Microsoft Windows systems
- Disk-at-Once, an optical disc recording mode
- Decentralized autonomous organization, an organization that is run through rules encoded as computer programs called smart contracts

=== Other ===
- De-asphalted oil, a crude oil refinery process stream
- Double-action only, a type of trigger mechanism for handguns

== Organizations ==
- Daallo Airlines (ICAO code)
- Dansk Avis Omdeling, a postal service in Denmark
- The DAO, a former digital organization established in 2016
- Decentralized autonomous organization, a type of organization
- Defence Acquisition Organisation, the former name of the Australian Defence Materiel Organisation
- Dominion Astrophysical Observatory in Saanich, British Columbia, Canada

== Weapons ==
- Dao (Chinese sword) (刀), a type of Chinese sword
- Dao (Naga sword), a weapon and a tool of Naga people

== Other uses ==
- Defense Attaché Office, the office for military matters at embassies; for example see Embassy of the United States, Tel Aviv

== See also ==
- Dão-Lafões, a region in Portugal
- Taoism
- Dau (disambiguation)
- Tao (disambiguation)
