= Dansk Avis Omdeling =

Danish print media distributor and courier

- Type: Aktieselskab
- Traded as: DAO
- Industry: Courier, Postal services, Printed media distribution
- Founded: January 1, 1921; 105 years ago
- Headquarters: Vejle, Denmark
- Area served: Denmark
- Key people: Hans Peter Nissen, CEO
- Services: Print media distribution, Letter post, parcel service
- Owner: JP/Politikens Hus (51%); JFM (32%); Berlingske Media (17%)
- Number of employees: 1569 (October 2025)
- Website: dao.as

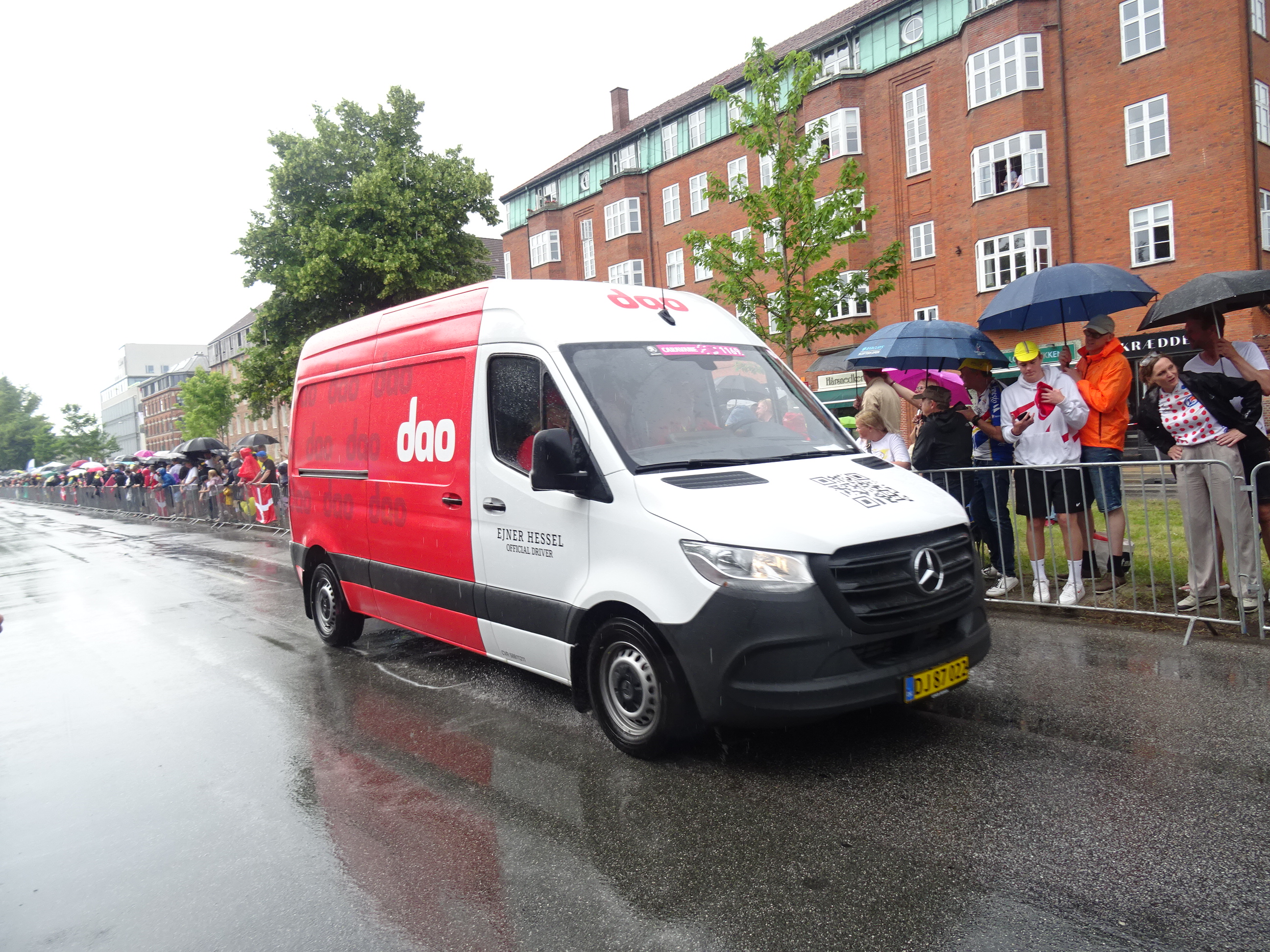
A DAO post van

Dansk Avis Omdeling A/S (lit. 'Danish Newspaper Distribution'), known simply by its acronym DAO, is a Danish logistics company which specialises in print media distribution and postal delivery. Since 2026, it became the national postal operator, replacing PostNord Danmark.

It was founded in 1921 to deliver newspapers and magazines in the Jutland region on behalf of its owners, which are the three of the country's main newspaper publishing companies; JP/Politikens Hus (51%), JFM (32%) and Berlingske Media (17%). Today, it handles operations nationwide throughout Denmark.

== Postal service ==
Since 2011, the company gained a domestic courier licence from the Danish Civil Aviation and Railway Authority, the office that deals postal licensing in parcel delivery under the Post Act 2010, which liberalises Denmark's postal market. It utilizes its network of local newsagents to handle and distribute letters and parcels, with the company's couriers delivering the mail.

On 6 March 2025, DAO's main rival, the incumbent PostNord Danmark announced that it would pull out of the postal delivery business at the end of the year, saying it was losing money delivering letters. In response, DAO said it would assume the role of national mail operator. To help in the transition to becoming the nation's mail carrier, DAO received a one-off government grant of 110 million kroner (14.7 million euro). This would also include delivering any international correspondence to Danish households. However, it would not be adopting the country's outdoor post boxes to deposit outbound mail, in effect phasing them out. Instead customers who want to send letters would be required to either send their letters via franchised postal outlets called daoSHOPs, or get them collected by couriers for a small fee.

In the first few weeks of DAO’s new role as the national letter carrier, there has been criticism in the performance of the company. The company admitted it received in the first month, 15000 complaints, mainly about a number of delayed and missing letters and packets. Most notably, banks losing the delivery of bank cards and certification letters to customers. In a study done before DAO got the contract in 2025 by the Ministry of Transport where around 2500 test letters were posted to various addresses throughout Denmark, found that one in twenty letters got lost by the company compared to just 1% by PostNord.

== See also ==
- Postal codes in Denmark
- Postage stamps and postal history of Denmark
- Postverk Føroya – Faroese postal service (run by Denmark until 1976)
- Tusass – Greenlandic postal service (formerly run by Denmark)
- PostNord Logistics
