= 道 =

道 may refer to:

- Dao (political), an administrative division in China, Japan, or Korea
  - Provinces of Korea, the primary administrative division of Korea since the mid Goryeo dynasty in the early 11th century
    - Administrative divisions of North Korea
    - Administrative divisions of South Korea
- Taoism, a variety of related Chinese philosophical and religious traditions and concepts
  - Tao, the order of the Universe in Taoism
- Dō (Way), any one of a number of spiritual or martial disciplines of East Asia
- Michi (Exile song), a J-pop single by the band Exile, released in 2007

== See also ==
- Dao (disambiguation)
