= Post Danmark =

Danish postal service

Post Danmark A/S
- Trade name: PostNord Denmark
- Type: Subsidiary
- Industry: Postal services; Courier
- Founded: 1624 (as Postvæsenet)
- Defunct: 30 December 2025
- Fate: Discontinuation
- Headquarters: Copenhagen, Denmark
- Key people: Peter Kjær Jensen (CEO); Annemarie Gardshol (Chairman)
- Products: Mail
- Revenue: 5.290 billion DKK (Note: As of 2021)
- Net income: 165 million DKK (Note: As of 2021)
- Number of employees: 6,388 (Note: As of 2021)
- Parent: PostNord AB
- Website: postnord.dk

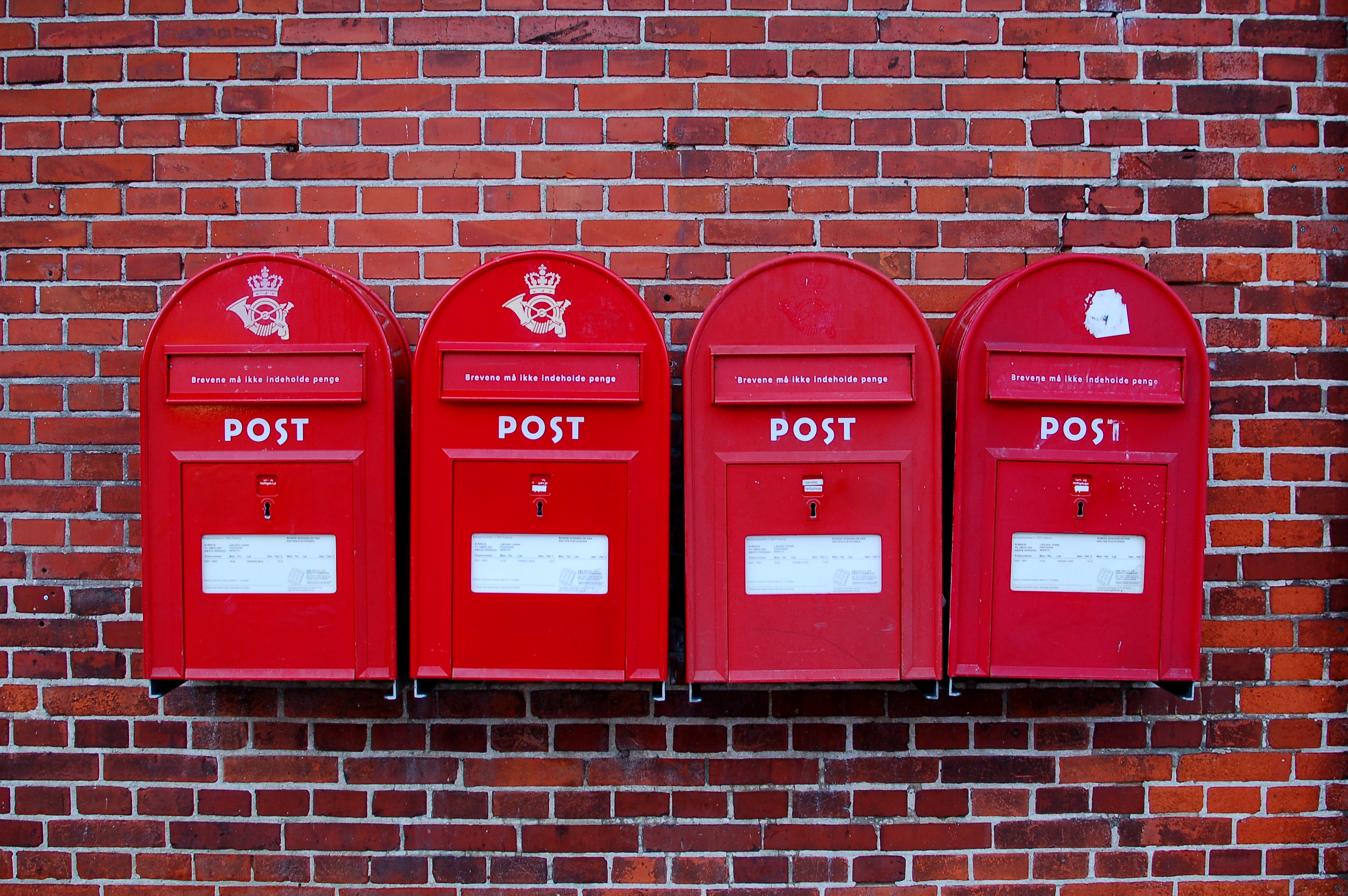
Post boxes in Fåborg

Post Danmark A/S, trading as PostNord Denmark (Danish: PostNord Danmark), was the national provider of postal services in Denmark. It was established as a fully state-owned stock holder's company in 1995 following political liberalization efforts. Post Danmark had taken over the mail delivery concession (Danish: befordringspligt) of its predecessor, the governmental department Postvæsenet, which was established in 1624. Post Danmark A/S was turned into a public limited company in 2002. In 2005, 22% of the company shares were sold to CVC Capital Partners, 3.5% of the company shares were partly sold to employees at a discount, partly kept in reserve for a management incentives program. In 2009, it was merged with the Swedish Posten AB to form PostNord, a joint postal service company between Denmark and Sweden.

As of 2007, Post Danmark employed about 21,000 people, and delivered approximately a billion letters and 37 million parcels every year. Post Danmark has a wide variety of services, such as express deliveries (ensured delivery by no later than 9 am the following morning), courier services, facility services, 10 o'clock service (ensured delivery no later than 10 am every day), and electronic mailbox (mail scanned electronically and sent by email instead of by regular post).

On 6 March 2025, PostNord announced that all letter mail deliveries will cease in Denmark by the end of 2025, citing a 90% decline in letter mail since 2000. However, on the same day it was also announced that another organization, Dansk Avis Omdeling will take over domestic letter deliveries in Denmark by 2026.

== Merger with Posten AB ==
On 1 April 2008 Post Danmark announced its intention to merge with its Swedish counterpart, Posten AB, to realise greater economies of scale and postal synergies. The combined company post-merger had an annual revenue of approximately 45 billion Swedish krona and employed more than 50,000 people. Immediately following the merger the combined company was 18% owned by the Danish state and the company's employees, 60% by the Swedish state, and 22% by the private equity house CVC Capital Partners. At that time it was expected that the company would be listed on the stock exchanges of both Copenhagen and Stockholm within 3–5 years, but as of 2019 this had yet to happen. The merger completed on 24 June 2009. Post Danmark merged with Posten AB to form the new holding company Posten Norden AB, currently known as PostNord. Posten Norden AB has since been renamed PostNord AB.

On 2 February 2009, in advance of the merger, it was announced that CVC had entered into an agreement with the Government of Denmark to sell its stake in Post Danmark in exchange for Post Danmark's 49.9 stake in La Poste/De Post (then the name for Bpost), the state postal service of Belgium, in a transaction valued at €473 million. CVC had originally acquired its stake in Post Danmark in 2005 during the latter's partial privatisation.

The Post Danmark logo used from 2002 to 2009

== Discontinuation of letter service ==
PostNord announced the discontinuation of its letter service in Denmark by the end of 2025 when it will focus on parcels instead. The delivery of the last letter happened on 30 December 2025 to the postal and communications museum.

Since June 2025, PostNord has been removing the 1,500 mailboxes across Denmark. On 10 December of the same year it sold them off to raise money for charity, but thousands of Danes also tried to buy one. For each mailbox, they paid either 2,000 ($315) or 1,500 ($236) Danish kroner, depending on their condition.

== See also ==
- Postal codes in Denmark
- Postage stamps and postal history of Denmark
- Postverk Føroya – Faroese postal service (run by Denmark until 1976)
- Tusass – Greenlandic postal service (formerly run by Denmark)
- PostNord Logistics
