= G30 (disambiguation) =

G30 may refer to:

- Group of Thirty, an international body addressing economic issues.
- BMW 5 Series (G30), the seventh generation of BMW 5 Series.
- Glock 30 pistol.
- G30 Schools.
- Schizophrenia-associated gene DAOA-AS1, formerly known as G30.
- G30 Lianyungang–Khorgas Expressway, an expressway in China.
