= PostNord Sverige =

Swedish postal service

- Company type: State-owned company
- Industry: Postal services; Courier
- Founded: 1636
- Headquarters: Solna, Sweden
- Key people: Lars Idermark (CEO)
- Products: Mail
- Revenue: SEK 2.051 billion (2011)
- Owner: Swedish Government (60%); Danish Government (40%)
- Number of employees: 30,000
- Parent: PostNord AB
- Subsidiaries: Strålfors AB; DPD Nordic AB; Tidningstorget AB; Addresspoint AB; Svensk Adressändring AB; Tollpost Globe AS
- Website: posten.se

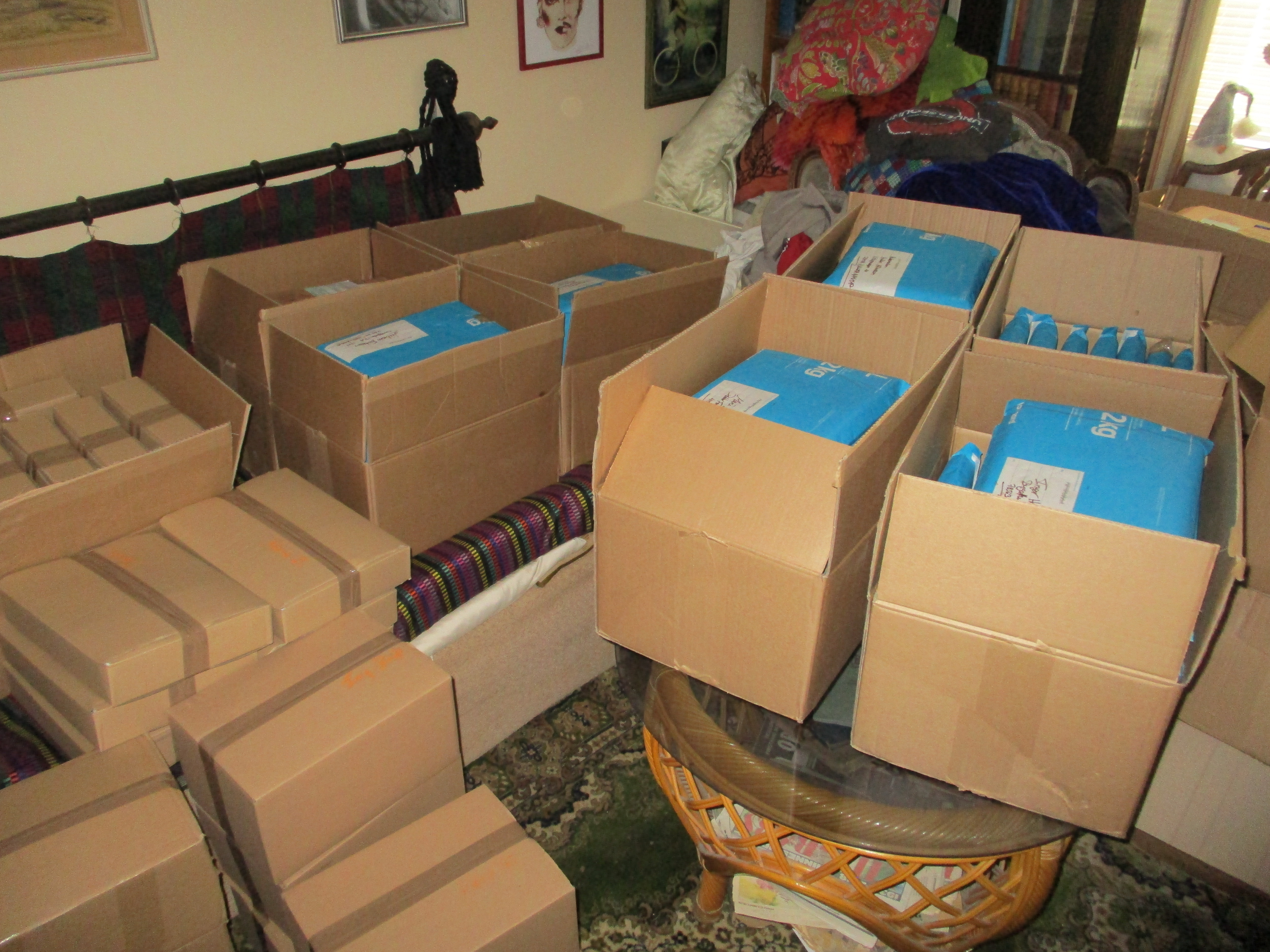
Books in special PostNord packaging awaiting home pick-up by company employees in 2021

PostNord Sverige AB (formerly Posten AB) is a Swedish postal service and courier company, which is part of PostNord. In 2009 Posten merged with its Danish equivalent, Post Danmark A/S, to form PostNord AB, a company that is jointly owned by the Swedish (60%) and Danish (40%) governments. A rebranding to PostNord for both the mail and logistics divisions was performed in 2015.

== History ==
The service was established as Kungliga Postverket (The Royal Postal Agency) in 1636 by the Lord High Chancellor of Sweden Axel Oxenstierna, who was de facto regent until the young Queen Christina took the throne in 1644. It was operated as a government agency into the 1990s when it was transformed into a government-owned limited company, Posten AB.

One of the most visible changes to the postal service was the decision in 2000 to replace Posten's numerous post offices with a franchise net of postal service points, run by grocery shops and petrol stations. Postal Service Centres, run by PostNord, are maintained for business clients only.

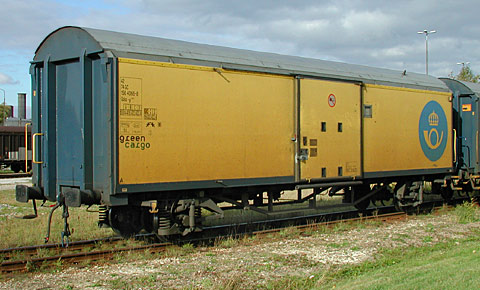
Posten AB railcar, operated jointly with Green Cargo

In addition to regular mail, PostNord is also the largest distributor in Sweden of advertising mail.

Mail and package delivery has in recent times become less reliable in Sweden, accredited to the large scale organisational changes and rationalisation in the last decade. Nevertheless, it is under increasing competition from private companies on the Swedish deregulated postal market. Their main competitor is the formerly private company CityMail, nationalised by Norway as of 2006.

On 24 June 2009, Posten AB merged with Post Danmark to form the new holding company PostNord AB, owned by the Swedish (60%) and Danish (40%) governments.

== Transportation of the mail ==
All second-class mail in Sweden has been sent by rail since 2001.

== Directors General of Postverket ==
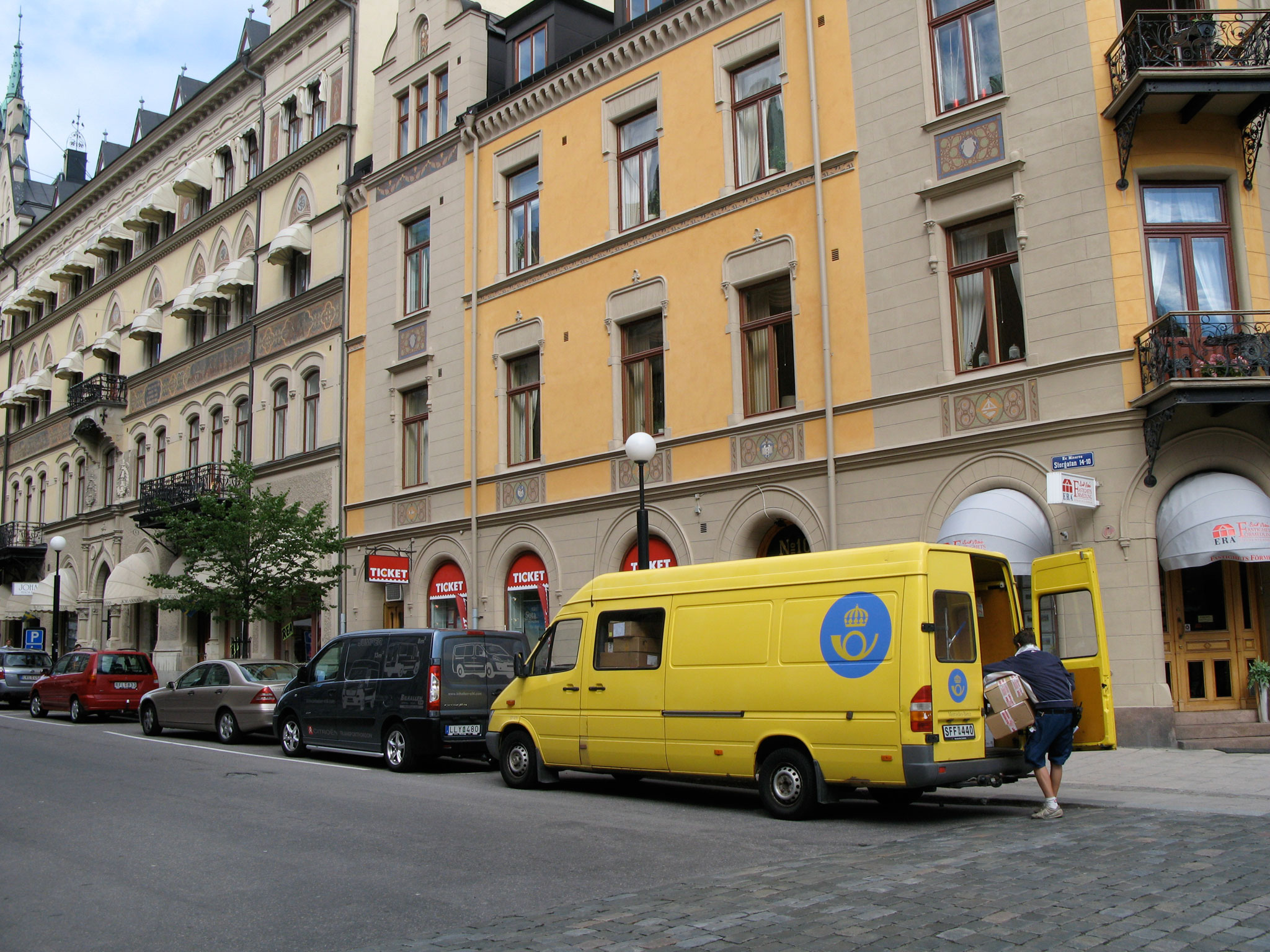
Postal van in Sundsvall

- 1850–1867 Otto Wilhelm Staël von Holstein (1802–1884)
- 1867–1889 Wilhelm Roos (1824–1895)
- 1889–1907 Edvard von Krusenstjerna (1841–1907)
- 1896–1902 Frans Herman Schlytern (acting)
- 1907–1907 Richard Ossbahr (1853–1936)
- 1907–1925 Julius Juhlin (1861–1934)
- 1925–1947 Anders Örne (1881–1956)
- 1947–1965 Erik Swartling (1900–1985)
- 1965–1973 Nils Hörjel (1917–2006)
- 1973–1982 Ove Rainer (1925–1987)
- 1982–1988 Bertil Zachrisson (1926–2023)
- 1988–1994 Ulf Dahlsten (1946–)

== Managing Directors of Posten AB ==
- 1994–1998 Ulf Dahlsten (1946–)
- 1999–2002 Lennart Grabe (1946–)
- 2002–2003 Börje Österholm (1942–)
- 2003–2008 Erik Olsson (1959–)
- 2008– Lars G. Nordström (1943–)

== See also ==
- Postage stamps and postal history of Sweden
- Postcode areas in Sweden
- List of Swedish government enterprises
- Posten Norge, the Norwegian postal service
