= Burelage =

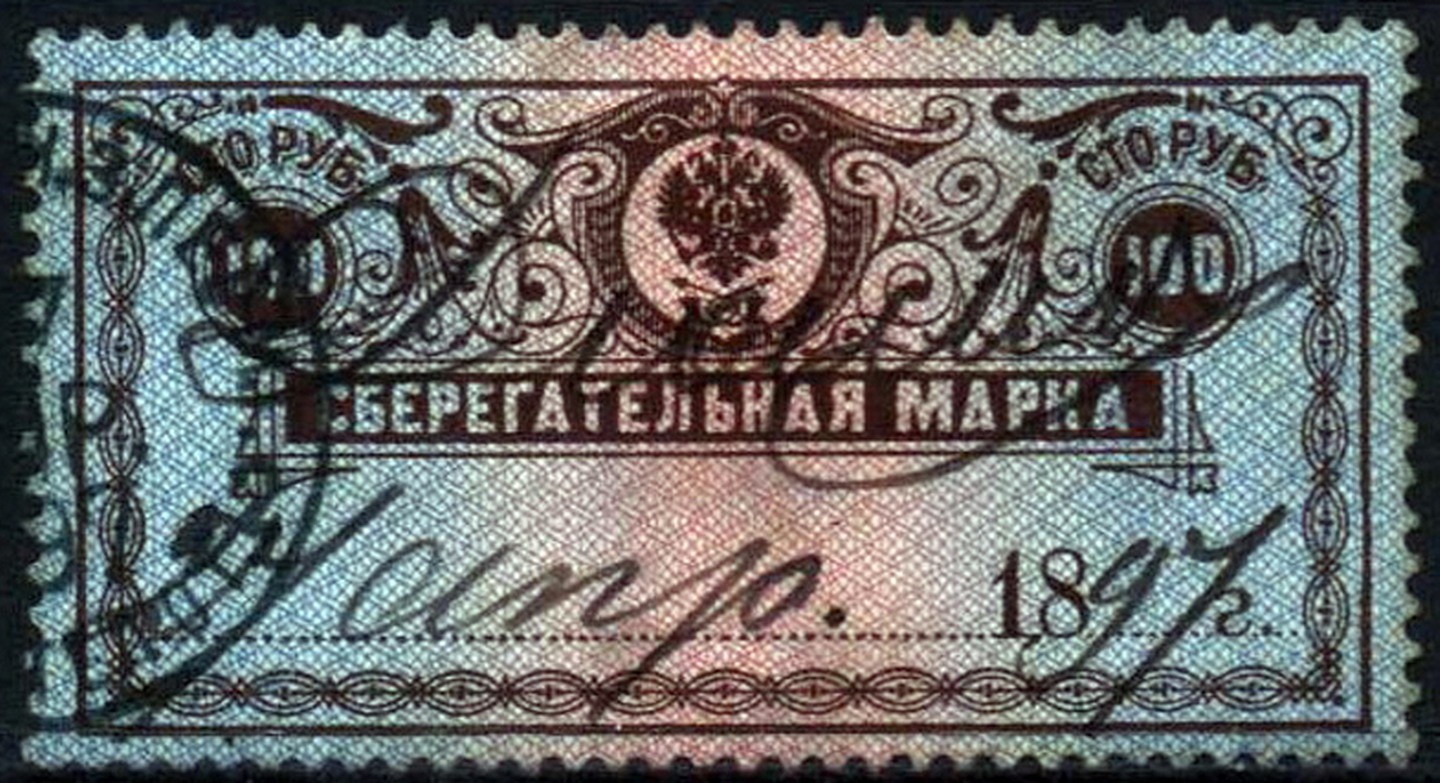
1896 Russian stamp with burelage

Burelage (French: burelage), also burelé, is a French term referring to an intricate network of fine lines, dots or other designs printed over or as the background of some postage or revenue stamps to prevent counterfeiting. In English the word is sometimes spelled with an accent on the first "e" as burélage, although the accent does not appear in the French spelling and its origin is unclear. Burelage most commonly appears as a form of underprinting.

Early uses of burelage on postage stamps include the first issue of the stamps of Denmark from 1851, and stamps issued by the City of Hanover beginning in 1855. Stamp varieties may be distinguished in catalogs based on the presence or absence of burelage as well as variations in the burelage itself, such as the size of network, orientation on the stamp, color, or method of printing.

Although burelage is usually unobtrusive, some of the Mexico Exporta stamps (see below) had burelage printed over the stamp which is dark enough to obscure the stamp image.

== Examples of burelage ==
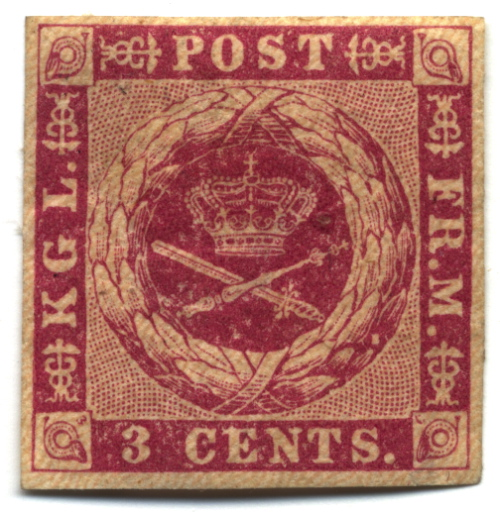
Danish West Indies stamp, 1866, with wavy burelage visible on margins and corners

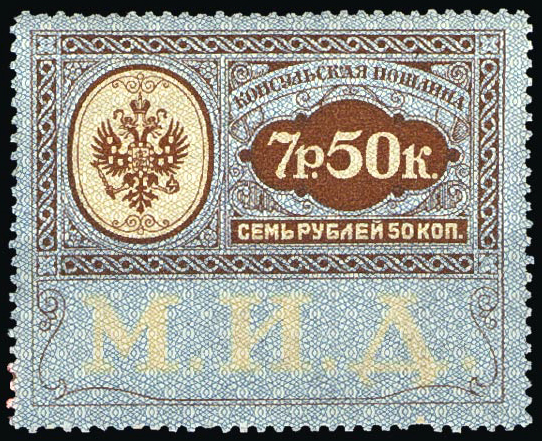
Russian consular stamp

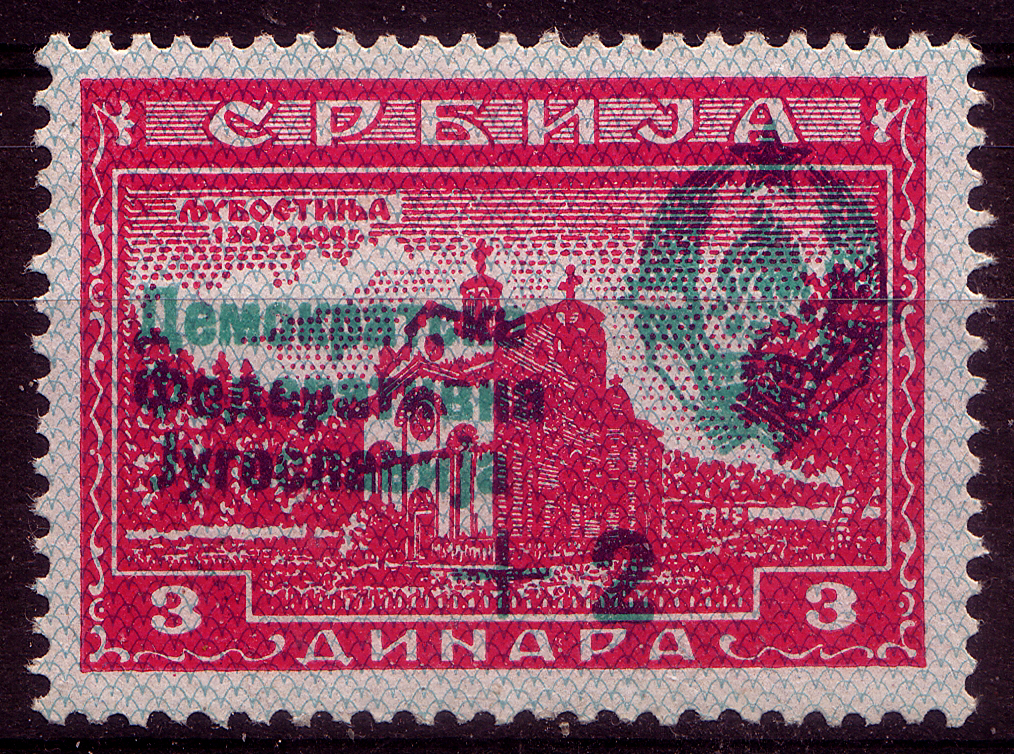
Serbian stamp, 1945, with Yugoslavian overprint

== See also ==
- Grill (philately)
- Security paper
- Stamp design
