= CityMail =

Private postal organisation in Sweden and Denmark

Citymail AB
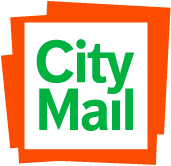
- Company type: Corporation
- Industry: Mail
- Founded: 1991
- Headquarters: Stockholm, Sweden
- Area served: Sweden
- Key people: Per Ovrén(CEO)
- Services: Mail, Advertising
- Number of employees: 1,500
- Website: https://www.citymail.se/

Citymail AB is a private postal organisation operating in Sweden (since 1991) and Denmark between 2007 and 2009, competing with the Swedish-Danish state-owned Postnord.

They specialize in direct mail and advertising.
