= Postage stamps and postal history of Sweden =

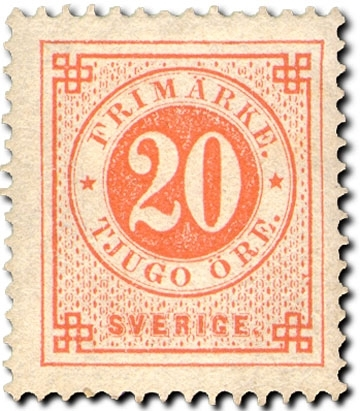
An 1879 stamp of Sweden

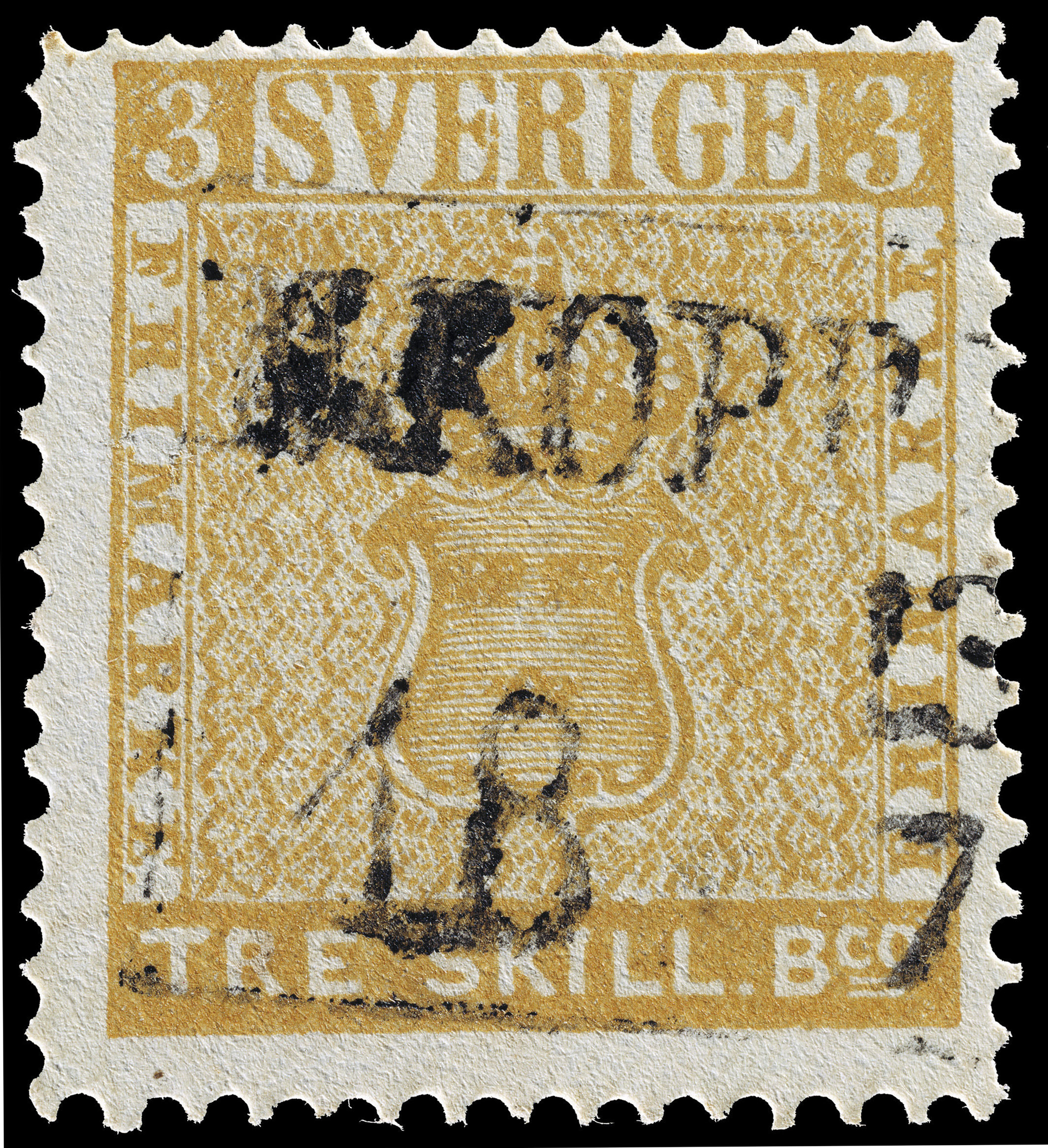
Three skilling banco error of color

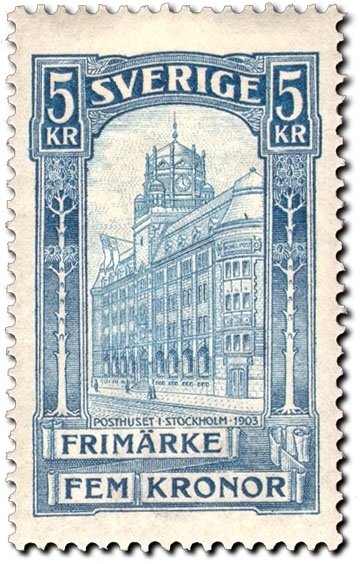
A 1903 stamp of Sweden

Posten, the Swedish mail service, was established in 1636 by Axel Oxenstierna, and by the 18th century it had been extended throughout the country.

== 19th century ==
Sweden issued its first postage stamps on 1 July 1855, a set of five values denominated in skilling banco. These stamps depicted the coat of arms, were inscribed "SVERIGE", as have been all subsequent Swedish stamps, and were perforated. A printing error resulted in the Treskilling Yellow, a unique stamp that is currently the highest-priced in the world. The currency changed to öre and riksdaler on 1 July 1858, necessitating a new issue of stamps; the design was the same as before, but the stamps slightly smaller.

A new design that included a reclining lion appeared in 1862, but it was used only for 3 öre, 17 öre, and 20 öre values before being superseded in 1872 by a design featuring a large numeral in a round frame. The numeral issue included Sweden's first bi-colored stamp; the 1-riksdaler value was printed in bistre and blue, and the center design was the Three Crowns of the royal arms. The numerals continued in use for nearly twenty years, the main change being the replacement of the riksdaler stamp with a 1-kronor value in 1878 (five years after the introduction of krona).

The monarch made a first appearance on stamps in 1885, in the person of Oscar II, who was depicted in profile on a 10 öre value. The following year the practice began of printing a posthorn on the back of each stamp, underneath the gum. In 1889 a shortage of 10 öre values necessitated the surcharge of 12 öre and 24 öre numerals.

In 1891 a new definitive series featured bi-colored numerals for low values and a profile of Oscar II for the 5 öre and up. On 26 October 1903, Sweden's first commemorative stamp came out; a 5-kronor value depicting the Stockholm Post Office on the occasion of its opening.

== 20th century ==
A new series of 1910 used an arms design for low values, and a full-face portrait of King Gustav V. Additional surcharges were needed in 1918 before new stamps of the series could be printed. 1920 saw the introduction of coil stamps using a lion design and a new portrait of Gustav, along with a crown and posthorn design for larger denominations, as well as a commemorative depicting Gustavus Adolphus and marking the 300th anniversary of a precursor mail route that ran from Stockholm to Hamburg. These and subsequent Swedish issues were usually issued in both booklet (or sheet) and coil form.

During the 1920s, the 1920 definitives were gradually supplanted by a new series with a 3/4 profile of Gustav. In 1924, the Universal Postal Union celebrated its 50th anniversary and its Congress was held in Stockholm, so Sweden issued two series marking it, the first with a view of the Stockholm skyline, and the second with two designs; a postrider watching an airplane, and a carrier pigeon over a globe. Both sets were primarily aimed at collectors, but are nevertheless prized today.

Another major commemorative set in 1936 marked the 300th anniversary of the postal service with 12 values each with its own design noting some aspect of Sweden's postal history to date.

In 1939 a new series used a profile of Gustav for lower values, and the Three Crowns for higher; the crowns design continued in use into the 1960s. Meanwhile, the pattern for commemoratives was to issue about 3–4 each year, typically a single design in two denominations, with the lower value available in both booklet and coil form, and the higher as a coil stamp only.

Gustaf VI Adolf appeared in profile from 1951 on.

Czesław Słania began doing engraving for the post in 1959, and so became well known for work of exceptional quality.

The definitives of 1967 were a major departure from tradition. Instead of portraits of the king, the 18 designs encompassed a wide variety of subjects, including wildlife, scenery, daily life, history, and legend, each realized in radically different styles.

== 21st Century ==
In 2025 in addition to stamps illustrating emojis, Swedish art glass, the history of radio and roses, a picture of Queen Silvia for international letters up to 50 grams were released.

== See also ==
- Joint issues of Sweden

== Sources ==
- Stanley Gibbons Ltd: various catalogues
- Encyclopaedia of Postal Authorities
- Rossiter, Stuart & John Flower. The Stamp Atlas. London: Macdonald, 1986. ISBN 0-356-10862-7
