= Sarcosine oxidase =

sarcosine oxidase

Identifiers
- EC no.: 1.5.3.1
- CAS no.: 9029-22-5

Databases
- IntEnz: IntEnz view
- BRENDA: BRENDA entry
- ExPASy: NiceZyme view
- KEGG: KEGG entry
- MetaCyc: metabolic pathway
- PRIAM: profile
- PDB structures: RCSB PDB PDBe PDBsum
- Gene Ontology: AmiGO / QuickGO
Search
- PMC: articles
- PubMed: articles
- NCBI: proteins

Sarcosine oxidase is an enzyme (EC 1.5.3.1) that catalyzes the oxidative demethylation of sarcosine to yield glycine.

sarcosine
+ H_{2}O
O_{2}
H_{2}O_{2}
glycine
+ H_{2}C=O

The enzyme uses flavin adenine dinucleotide as a cofactor and oxygen is required, which is converted to hydrogen peroxide. The methyl group of sarcosine leaves as formaldehyde. Corynebacterial sarcosine oxidase is a heterotetramer and is produced as an inducible enzyme when Corynebacterium sp.is grown with sarcosine as source of carbon and energy.
