= Dynamic drive overlay =

Dynamic drive overlay (DDO, also referred to as: software translation driver) is a software technique to extend a system BIOS that does not support logical block addressing (LBA) to access drives larger than 504 MiB. The technology was continued with similar types of problems up to the LBA-48 extension.

This technique overrides some of the motherboard BIOS' hard disk controller driver in RAM. To allow access to the full size of any hard disk the software must be loaded before other programs try to access the upper parts of a disk with a critical size. To ensure that this extension gets loaded early most often the boot disk's master boot record is modified and the software installed at the beginning of the disk.

The most widespread vendor for such an extension is the company Ontrack which is licensing its DDO component to several of the major hard disk vendors for integration into their management tools and into their products.

The application of a Dynamic Drive Overlay (DDO), as licensed to Samsung Corporation for example, by Kroll Ontrack's version in their Disk Manager program is for the installation of various hard drives (Ultra/Super IDE/Parallel ATA) in computers that have older BIOS chips that do not recognize hard disk drives larger than 137.4 Gigabytes. The interface is a software program that is loaded at start-up by the computer and augments the BIOS code, thus allowing the system to recognize and read areas of the hard disk drive that normally would not be accessible by the older BIOS.
