= D-amino acid dehydrogenase =

Class of enzymes

D-arginine dehydrogenase

Identifiers
- EC no.: 1.4.99.6
- CAS no.: 37205-44-0
- Alt. names: D-amino-acid dehydrogenase

Databases
- BRENDA: enzyme data
- ExPASy: NiceZyme view
- KEGG: enzyme entry
- MetaCyc: metabolic pathway
- Rhea: reactions
- PDB structures: RCSB PDB PDBe PDBsum
- Gene Ontology: AmiGO / QuickGO
Search
- PMC: articles
- PubMed: articles
- NCBI: proteins

D-amino-acid dehydrogenase (EC 1.4.99.1, transferred to 1.4.99.6) is a bacterial enzyme that catalyses the oxidation of D-amino acids into their corresponding oxoacids. It contains both flavin and nonheme iron as cofactors. The enzyme has a very broad specificity and can act on most D-amino acids.

- D-amino acid + H_{2}O + acceptor ⇌ a 2-oxo acid + NH_{3} + reduced acceptor

This reaction is distinct from the oxidation reaction catalysed by D-amino acid oxidase that uses oxygen as a second substrate, as the dehydrogenase can use many different compounds as electron acceptors, with the physiological substrate being coenzyme Q.

D-amino acid dehydrogenase is an enzyme that catalyzes NADPH from NADP^{+} and D-glucose to produce D-amino acids and glucose dehydrogenase. Some but not limited to these amino acids are D-leucine, D-isoleucine, and D-valine, which are essential amino acids that humans cannot synthesize because they are not included in their diet. Moreover, D-amino acids catalyzes the formation of 2-oxo acids to produce D-amino acids in the presence of DCIP which is an electron acceptor. D-amino acids are used as components of pharmaceutical products, such as antibiotics, anticoagulants, and pesticides, because they have been shown to be not only more potent than their L enantiomers, but also more resistant to enzyme degradation. D-amino acid dehydrogenase enzymes have been synthesized via mutagenesis with an ability to produce straight, branched, cyclic aliphatic and aromatic D-amino acids. Solubilized D-amino acid dehydrogenase tends to increase its affinity for D-alanine, D-asparagine, and D-α-amino-n-butyrate.

In E. coli K12 D-amino acid dehydrogenase is most active with D-alanine as its substrate, as this amino acid is the sole source of carbon, nitrogen, and energy. The enzyme works optimally at pH 8.9 and has a Michaelis constant for D-alanine equal to 30 mM. DAD discovered in Gram-negative E. coli B membrane can convert L-amino acids into D-amino acids as well.

Additionally, D-amino acid dehydrogenase is used in dye-linked dehydrogenase (dye-DHs) which uses artificial dyes such as 2,6-dichloroindophenol (DCIP) as their electron acceptor rather than using their natural electron acceptors. This can accelerate the reaction between the enzyme and the substrate when the electrons are being transferred.

== Use in synthesis reactions ==
D-amino acid dehydrogenase has shown itself to be effective in the synthesis of branched-chain amino acids such as D-leucine, D-isoleucine, and D-valine. In the given study, researchers were successfully able to use D-amino acid dehydrogenase to create high amounts of these products from the starting material of 2-oxo acids, in the presence of ammonia. The conditions for this were variable, though the best results appeared at around 65 °C.

Amino Acids obtained through these reactions resulted in a high enantioselectivity of >99% and high yields of >99%.

Given the nature of this enzyme, it may be possible to use it in order to create non-branched D-amino acids as well as modified D-amino acids.

== Obtaining D-amino acid dehydrogenase ==
In one study, in order to test the viability of using D-amino dehydrogenase in synthesis reactions, researchers used mutant bacteria to obtain and create different strains of the enzyme. These researchers found that it only required five mutations in order to modify the selective D-amino dehydrogenase into working with other D-amino acids. They also found that it retained its highly selective nature, capable of receiving mostly D-enantiomers after mutation, with yields in excess of 95%.

A heat-stable variant of D-amino acid dehydrogenase was found in the bacterium Rhodothermus marinus JCM9785. This variant is involved in the catabolism of trans-4-hydroxy-L-proline.

From the given studies, in order to obtain D-amino acid dehydrogenase one must first introduce and express it within a given bacterial species, some of which have been previously referenced. It must then be purified under favorable conditions. These are based upon the particular species of D-amino acid dehydrogenase used in a given research experiment. Under incorrect conditions, the protein may denature. For example, it was found that specifically D-alanine dehydrogenases from E. coli and P. aeruginosa would lose most of their activity when subjected to conditions of 37–42 °C. After this, it is possible to separate and purify through existing methods.

== Artificial D-amino acid dehydrogenase ==
Due to the drawbacks of current methods, researchers have begun work on creating an artificial enzyme capable of producing the same D-amino acids as enzymes from naturally occurring sources. By adding five amino acids to a given sample isolated from U. thermosphaericus, they succeeded. By modifying the amino acid sequence, researchers were able to change the specificity of the molecule towards certain reactants and products, showing that it may be possible to use artificial D-amino acid dehydrogenase to screen for certain D-amino acid products.

== See also ==
- Oxidative phosphorylation
- Electron transport chain
- Microbial metabolism
