= PostNord =

Postal service mainly in the Nordics

PostNord AB

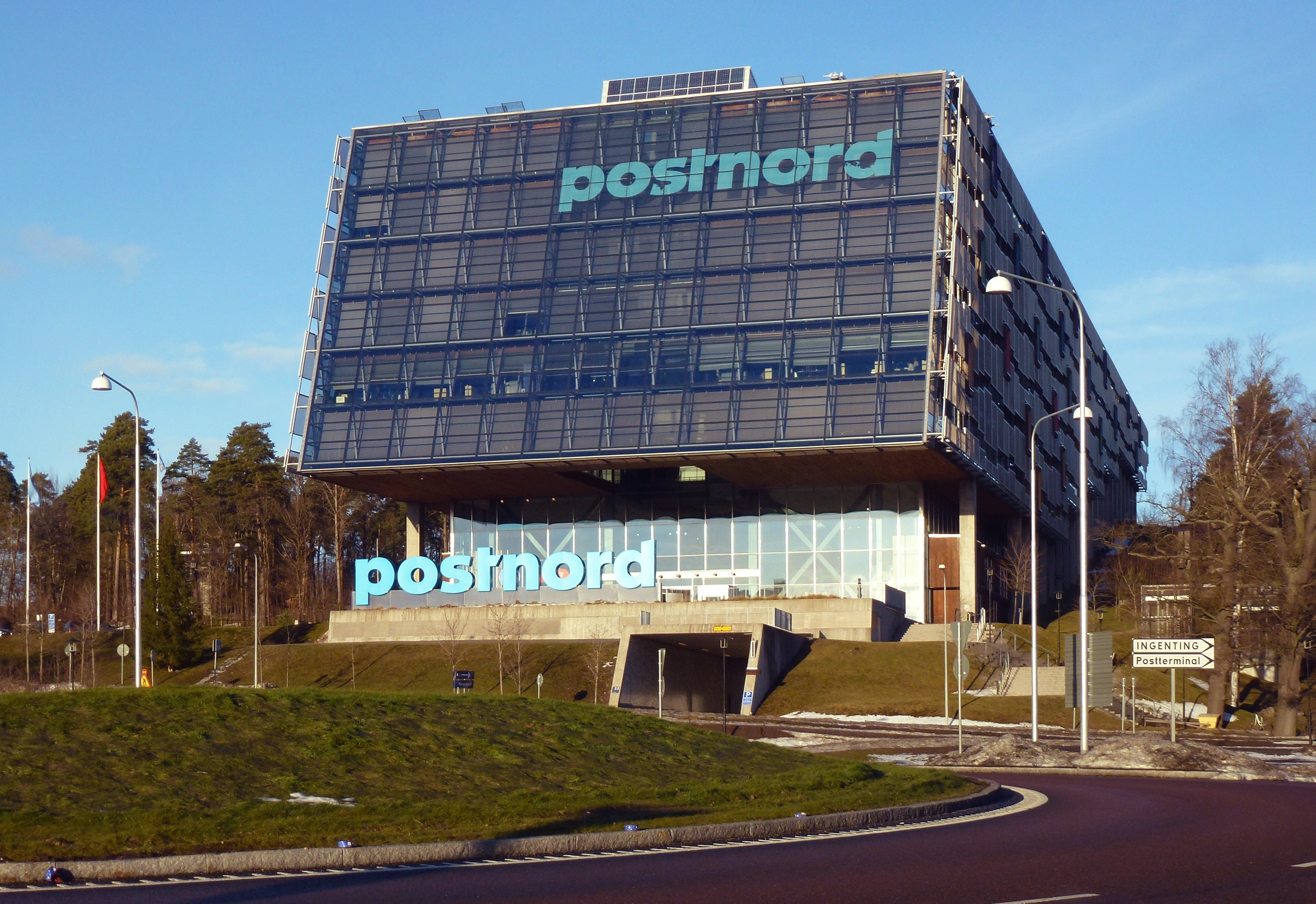
- Headquarters of PostNord AB
- Type: State-owned company
- Predecessors: Post Danmark A/S; Posten AB
- Founded: 24 June 2009
- Founders: Danish Government; Swedish Government
- Headquarters: Solna, Sweden,
- Key people: Christian W. Jansson (Chairman); Annemarie Gardshol (President & CEO)
- Revenue: ▲SEK 41,646 million (2021)
- Operating income: ▲SEK 2,481 million (2021)
- Net income: ▲SEK 1,989 million (2021)
- Total assets: ▲SEK 30,590 million (end of 2021)
- Total equity: ▲SEK 9,133 million (end of 2021)
- Owners: Swedish Government (60%); Danish Ministry of Transport (40%)
- Number of employees: 28,358 (average, 2021)
- Divisions: PostNord Denmark; PostNord Finland; PostNord Norway; PostNord Sweden; PostNord Strålfors; PostNord TPL
- Website: postnord.com

PostNord AB is a provider of postal services operating mainly in the Nordic countries. The company was formed on 24 June 2009, under the name Posten Norden, as the holding company in a merger between the Danish and Swedish postal service providers Post Danmark A/S and Posten AB. In 2011, the name of the company was changed to PostNord.

The owners of PostNord Group are the state of Sweden (60 percent) and the Ministry of Transport of Denmark (40 percent). The voting rights are, however, split equally (50/50) between the two owners, and the respective owners name equal numbers of corporate board members.

In 2015, the subsidiary that operates in Sweden changed its name from Posten AB to PostNord Group AB, whereas the name of the legal entity operating in Denmark was not changed. In Sweden, as of 2020, the group is the second largest company by number of employees, after Volvo Cars.

== History ==
=== Denmark ===
The precursor of Post Danmark was the Danish national postal service, Postvæsenet, which was founded in 1624 as King Christian IV issued a regulation on the transmission of letters. During its early history, the Danish postal service was operated under private as well as royal control, but it was nationalized in 1711. Already before the nationalization, the postal service had introduced uniforms in red and yellow. These colors have since then remained the distinguishing marks of the organization.

The first Danish postage stamp was issued in 1851. In 1927, the Danish postal and telegraphy services were merged under the name Post- og Telegrafvæsenet. In 1990, the telecommunications business was spun off into a separate joint-stock company (today TDC Holding A/S), and in 1995, the postal operations were transferred to the wholly state-owned company Post Danmark A/S, with a monopoly on transmission of letters weighing up to 100 grams. In 2005, the weight limit was lowered to 50 grams, and in 2011, the monopoly was abolished.

=== Sweden ===
The history of Posten AB reaches back to 1636, when the regency government during the minority of Queen Christina issued regulations on postal services. Previous to that, transmission of letters had been organized on behalf of the government and the church. For periods of several years from the 1650s to the 1670s, postal services in Sweden were entrusted to private monopolies, but from 1677, and onwards until the late 20th century, they were provided by a government-controlled monopoly. The monopoly was abolished in 1993.

Beginning 1685, the Swedish postal service stamped letters to mark that the delivery had been paid for by the sender. Postage stamps were first issued in 1855.

Already by the time of the foundation, a post horn with a crown was used as the symbol of the Swedish postal service. The appearance of the symbol was standardized for the first time in 1912 and then changed several times in the 20th century, as well as in 2001.

In 1994, the operations of the Swedish postal service were transferred to the wholly state-owned joint-stock company Posten AB. In 2001, post offices were replaced by "parcel shops" embedded in partnering retail stores.

=== Merger ===
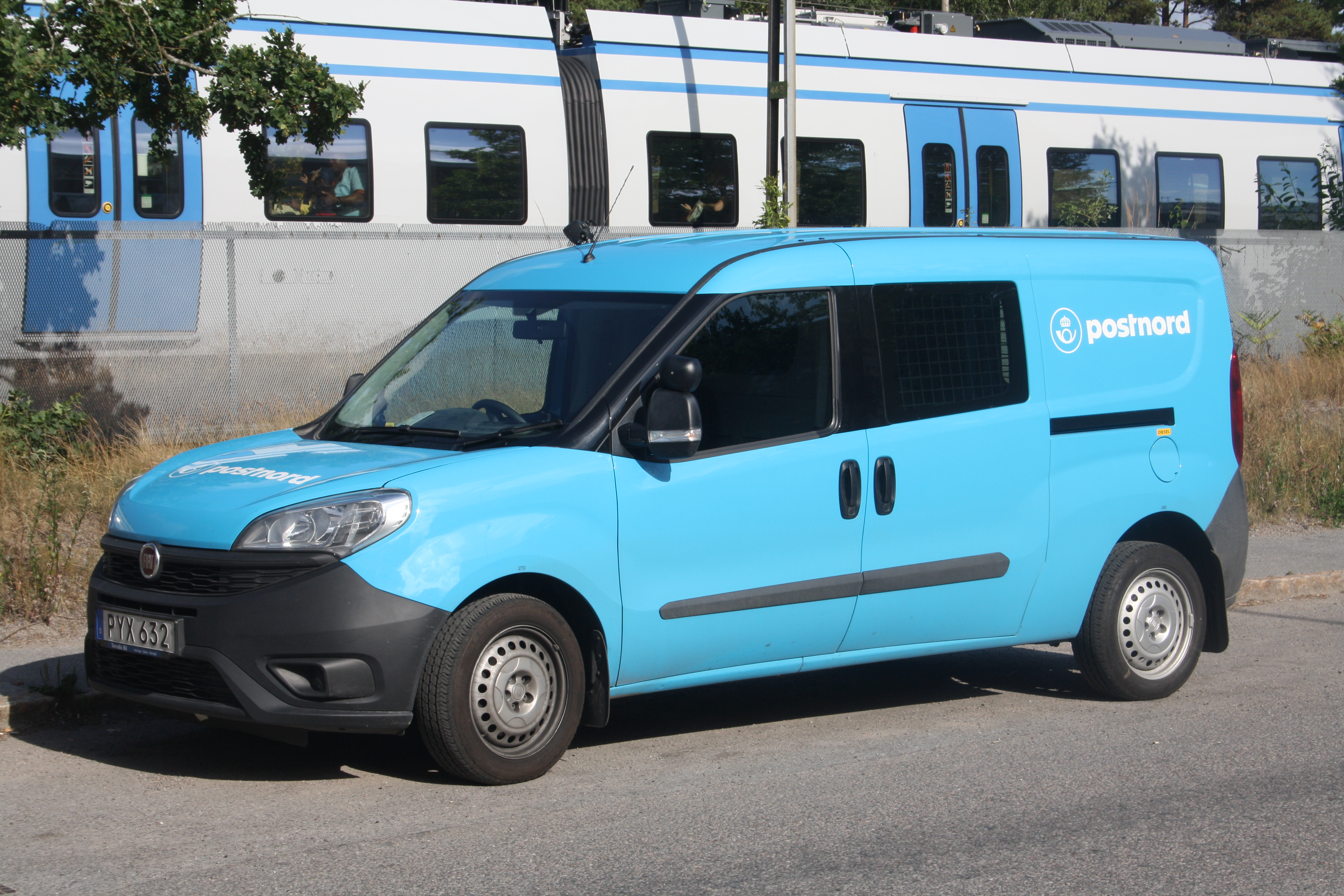
Mail van from PostNord in Skogås, Sweden.

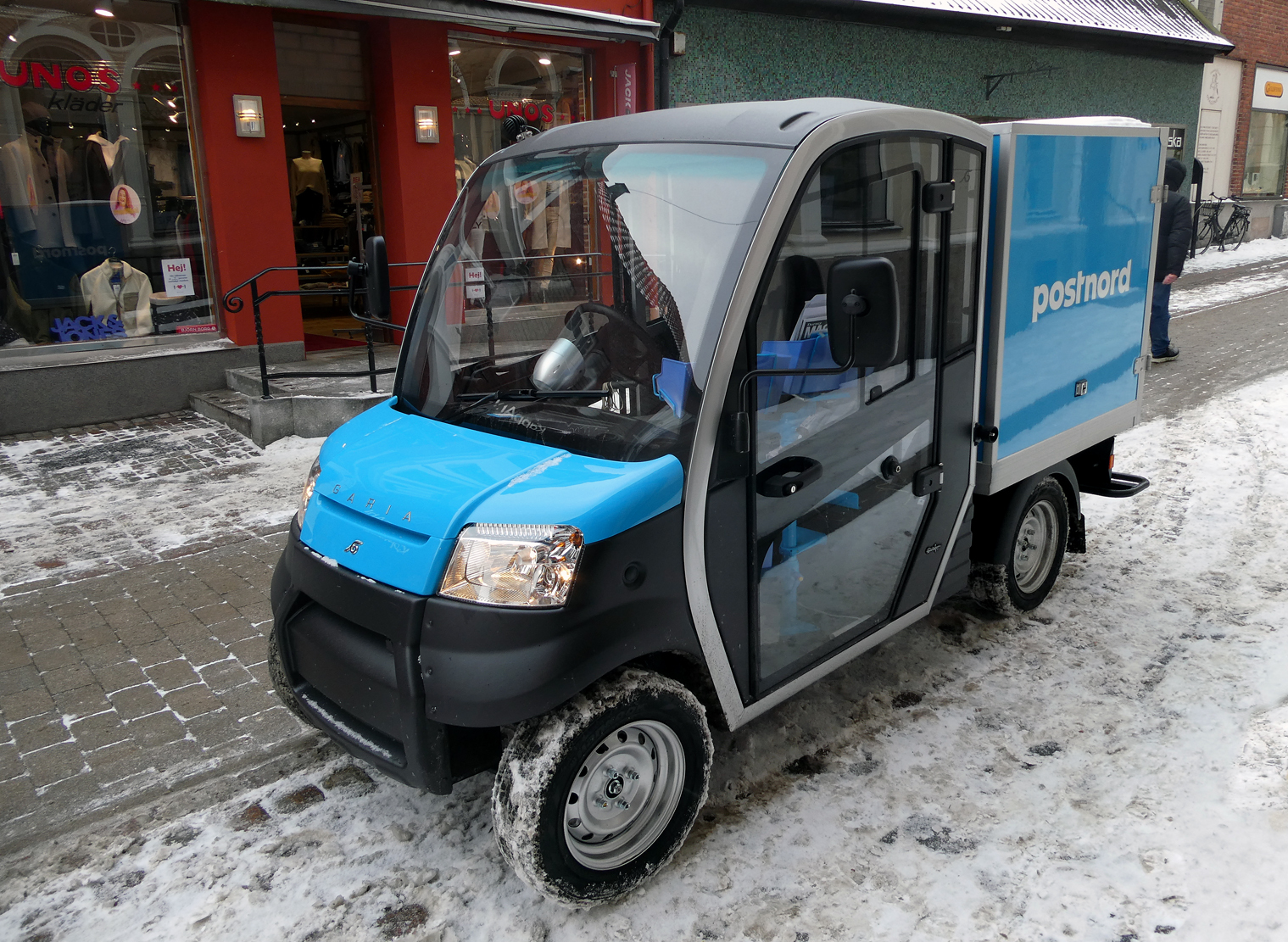
Electric mail van from PostNord in Ystad, Sweden 2021.

The companies Post Danmark A/S and Posten AB merged in June 2009, through a transfer of ownership to the holding company Posten Norden AB. On 17 May 2011, the holding company changed its name to PostNord AB. The merger was preceded by a review according to European Union competition law, and it was approved on the condition that overlapping businesses dealing with package delivery to business customers in Denmark were divested. Around 2013, the company initiated a gradual change of livery on its Swedish vans and trucks to the PostNord name and color (from yellow to light blue). Initially, the change mainly affected package delivery trucks, but since 2015, it has been applied to all aspects of the Swedish operations.

=== Developments in the 21st century ===
With the internet and the increased digital handling of messages and other services, the number of physical letters sent has decreased markedly. In 2000, 1.44 billion letters were transmitted in Denmark and 3.43 billion in Sweden. In 2020, the numbers were 196 million in Denmark and 1.59 billion in Sweden, a decrease by 86.4 percent and 53.6 percent, respectively.

Since the early 2010s, the strategy has been to focus more on the package delivery business, which is affected positively by increased e-commerce volumes. Another area where PostNord has been active since the early 21st century is the management of secure electronic messages from governments and companies to individual recipients. In March 2025, PostNord announced it would stop delivering letters within Denmark at year's end.

== Market ==
A large majority of PostNord's revenue is derived from markets in the Nordic countries (except Iceland). PostNord performs package delivery in all of these markets and mail delivery in Denmark and Sweden. The volumes of these activities are reported by country. However, the business area PostNord Strålfors, which deals with organizations that need to communicate with large groups of people, only reports numbers that include all markets.

| Presence per market/activity (2020) | Net sales (million SEK) | Number of letters (millions) | Number of service locations (approximate) |
|---|---|---|---|
| PostNord Sweden | 23,694 | 1,186 | 2,200 |
| PostNord Denmark | 9,304 | 193 | 2,900 |
| PostNord Norway | 4,481 | – | 1,600 |
| PostNord Finland | 1,371 | – | 2,200 |
| PostNord Strålfors | 1,981 | – | – |
| Other activities | 2,057 | – | – |

== Operations ==
In 2021, PostNord had an average of 28,358 full-time-equivalent employees. Of these, 19,300 worked in Sweden and 6,757 in Denmark, the countries where PostNord is the designated universal postal operator. Other countries with significant employee numbers are Norway with 1,598 employees and Finland with 383 employees.

PostNord has a partnership with DPDgroup around international parcel deliveries.

=== PostNord Denmark ===
The PostNord Denmark subsidiary, Post Danmark A/S, was (until 2025) the designated operator for universal postal services in Denmark. It is also one of the country's three largest package delivery providers, when counting packages to which postal regulations apply.

Letter volumes are falling in Denmark, with a decrease by 18 percent from 2019 to 2020, whereas the market for package deliveries is expanding. PostNord stopped delivering letters at the end of 2025.

=== PostNord Sweden ===
The PostNord Sweden subsidiary, PostNord Sverige AB, is the designated operator for universal postal services in Sweden and the largest package distributor in Sweden, with a market share of more than 50 percent in 2020 for packages weighing up to 20 kg.

The number of traditional physical letters delivered is decreasing, while package volumes are increasing. In 2020, letters accounted for around 40 percent of the total revenue of PostNord in Sweden.

Since 2021, PostNord Sweden has gradually been moving towards mail delivery once every two working days instead of every working day. The change is expected to be completed during 2022. This was made possible by changes to postal regulations issued in 2018.

In 2020, the Swedish government initiated a public inquiry to review the possibilities of further changes to postal regulations. Topics to be covered include confidentiality requirements and measures to avoid the distribution of narcotics and weapons through postal services. The financing of country-wide postal services is also being reviewed.

== Sponsorship ==
PostNord is the main sponsor of the men's and women's national basketball teams of Finland.
