= D-amino acid oxidase activator =

DAOA

Identifiers
- Aliases: DAOA, LG72, SG72, D-amino acid oxidase activator
- External IDs: OMIM: 607408; GeneCards: DAOA

Gene location (Human)
Chr.	Chromosome 13 (human)
Band	13q33.2|13q34	Start	105,465,867 bp
Band	13q33.2|13q34	End	105,491,034 bp
RNA expression pattern
Bgee	Human / Mouse (ortholog); Top expressed in: ganglionic eminence / n/a; More reference expression data
BioGPS	n/a
Gene ontology
Molecular function	enzyme binding; enzyme activator activity
Cellular component	perinuclear region of cytoplasm; Golgi apparatus; mitochondrion
Biological process	positive regulation of catalytic activity; negative regulation of D-amino-acid oxidase activity
Sources:Amigo / QuickGO
Orthologs
Databases	NCBI: entry; OMA: entry
Species	Human	Mouse
Entrez	267012	n/a
Ensembl	ENSG00000182346	n/a
UniProt	P59103	n/a
RefSeq (mRNA)	NM_001161812; NM_001161814; NM_172370; NM_001384644; NM_001384645 NM_001384646	n/a
RefSeq (protein)	NP_001155284; NP_001155286; NP_758958	n/a
Location (UCSC)	Chr 13: 105.47 – 105.49 Mb	n/a
PubMed search		n/a
- Wikidata
View/Edit Human

D-amino acid oxidase activator (DAOA, also known as G72) is a protein enriched in various parts of brain, spinal cord, and testis. DAOA is thought to interact with D-amino acid oxidase, a peroxisomal enzyme, and its gene was associated with schizophrenia in a number of studies.

Early research papers reported that it functioned as an activator for DAO, but later papers failed to replicate this. Instead, other research has suggested that it acts as a repressor for both DAO and SOD1.

== Isoforms ==
G72 is transcribed into several proteins due to alternative splicing; the longest protein is called LG72 and consists of 153 amino acids.

== Medical significance ==
In separate studies it has been shown to confer susceptibility to bipolar disorder. Therefore, it has been important in researching whether the Kraepelinian dichotomy is genuine. The gene itself was discovered during an investigation of chromosomal 13q22-q34 region, which was previously linked to schizophrenia.

== See also ==
- DAOA-AS1
