= D-aspartate oxidase =

Class of enzymes

DDO

Identifiers
- Aliases: DDO, Ddo, 5330420D20Rik, 5730402C02Rik, AI467244, DASOX, DDO-1, DDO-2, D-aspartate oxidase
- External IDs: OMIM: 124450; MGI: 1925528; GeneCards: DDO
Enzyme activity
| EC # | BRENDA | ExPASy | KEGG | MetaCyc |
|---|---|---|---|---|
| 1.4.3.1 | ↗ | ↗ | ↗ | ↗ |

Gene location (Human)
| Chr. | Chromosome 6 (human) |
| Band | 6q21 | Start | 110,391,771 bp |
| Band | 6q21 | End | 110,415,562 bp |

Gene location (Mouse)
| Chr. | Chromosome 10 (mouse) |
| Band | 10|10 B1 | Start | 40,506,007 bp |
| Band | 10|10 B1 | End | 40,557,843 bp |
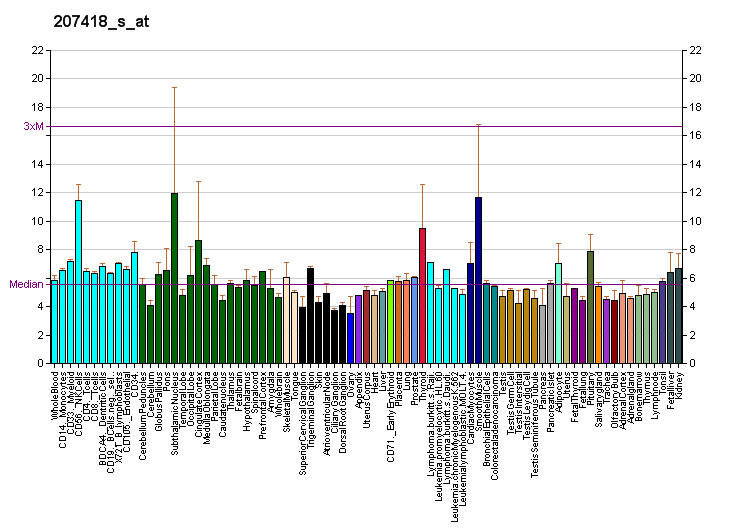

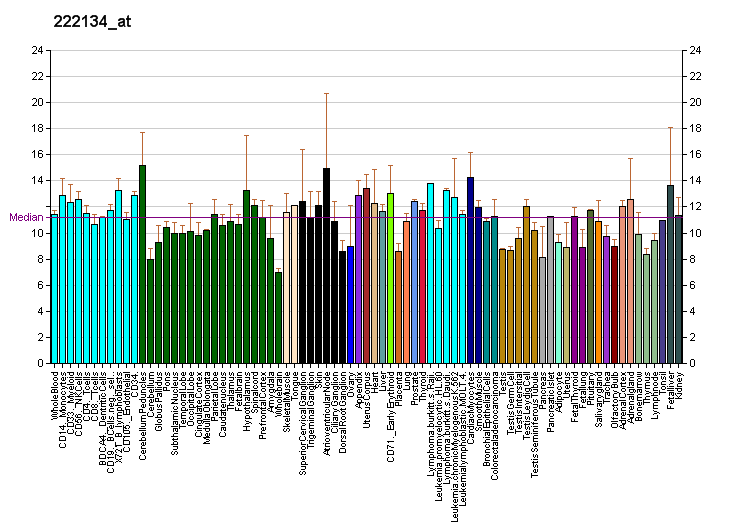
RNA expression pattern
| Bgee | Human / Mouse (ortholog); Top expressed in: left ventricle; apex of heart; right ventricle; myocardium; myocardium of left ventricle; right adrenal gland; right adrenal cortex; right auricle of heart; left adrenal gland; kidney tubule / Top expressed in: Ependyma of ventricular system of brain; digastric muscle; sternocleidomastoid muscle; right kidney; temporal muscle; triceps brachii muscle; soleus muscle; parotid gland; Epithelium of choroid plexus; myocardium of ventricle; More reference expression data |
| BioGPS | More reference expression data |
Gene ontology
| Molecular function | oxidoreductase activity; FAD binding; signaling receptor binding; protein binding; D-amino-acid oxidase activity; D-aspartate oxidase activity |
| Cellular component | peroxisome; peroxisomal matrix; cytosol; cytoplasm |
| Biological process | insemination; grooming behavior; aspartate metabolic process; D-amino acid metabolic process; hormone metabolic process; aspartate catabolic process; D-amino acid catabolic process; cellular nitrogen compound metabolic process; protein targeting to peroxisome |
Sources:Amigo / QuickGO
Orthologs
| Databases | NCBI: entry; OMA: entry |
| Species | Human | Mouse |
| Entrez | 8528 | 70503 |
| Ensembl | ENSG00000203797 | ENSMUSG00000063428 |
| UniProt | Q99489 | Q922Z0 |
| RefSeq (mRNA) | NM_003649; NM_004032 | NM_027442; NM_001316716; NM_001316717; NM_001316718; NM_001316719 |
| RefSeq (protein) | NP_004023; NP_001355099; NP_001355100; NP_001355101; NP_001355102 NP_001355103; NP_001355104; NP_001359037 | NP_001303645; NP_001303646; NP_001303647; NP_001303648; NP_081718 |
| Location (UCSC) | Chr 6: 110.39 – 110.42 Mb | Chr 10: 40.51 – 40.56 Mb |
| PubMed search |
- Wikidata
| View/Edit Human | View/Edit Mouse |

D-aspartate oxidase

Identifiers
- EC no.: 1.4.3.1
- CAS no.: 9029-20-3

Databases
- BRENDA: enzyme data
- ExPASy: NiceZyme view
- KEGG: enzyme entry
- MetaCyc: metabolic pathway
- Rhea: reactions
- PDB structures: RCSB PDB PDBe PDBsum
- Gene Ontology: AmiGO / QuickGO
Search
- PMC: articles
- PubMed: articles
- NCBI: proteins

D-aspartate oxidase (EC 1.4.3.1) is an enzyme that is encoded by the DDO gene. D-aspartate oxidase catalyzes the chemical reaction

D-Aspartic acid
+ H_{2}O
O_{2}
H_{2}O_{2}
O_{2}
H_{2}O_{2}
oxaloacetic acid
+ NH_{3}

The three substrates of this enzyme are D-aspartic acid, water and oxygen. Its products are oxaloacetic acid, hydrogen peroxide, and ammonia.

This enzyme belongs to the FAD dependent oxidoreductase family, specifically those acting on the CH-NH_{2} group of donors with oxygen as acceptor. The systematic name of this enzyme class is D-aspartate:oxygen oxidoreductase (deaminating). Other names in common use include aspartic oxidase, and D-aspartic oxidase. This enzyme participates in alanine and aspartate metabolism. It employs one cofactor, FAD.

D-aspartate oxidase is a peroxisomal flavoprotein that catalyzes the oxidative deamination of D-aspartate and N-methyl-D-aspartate. Flavin adenine dinucleotide or 6-hydroxyflavin adenine dinucleotide can serve as the cofactor in this reaction. Two (or four, according to Q99489) transcript variants encoding different isoforms have been found for this gene.

== See also ==
- Diamine oxidase
- D-amino acid oxidase
