= DAOA-AS1 =

Non-coding RNA in the species Homo sapiens

Identifiers
- Aliases: DAOA-AS1, DAOA-AS, DAOAAS, G30, DAOA antisense RNA 1
- External IDs: OMIM: 607415; GeneCards: DAOA-AS1

Gene location (Human)
Chr.	Chromosome 13 (human)
Band	13q33.2|13q34	Start	105,459,055 bp
Band	13q33.2|13q34	End	105,505,681 bp
RNA expression pattern
Bgee	Human / Mouse (ortholog); Top expressed in: buccal mucosa cell; gonad; upper lobe of left lung; left testis / n/a; More reference expression data
BioGPS	n/a
Orthologs
Databases	NCBI: entry; OMA: entry
Species	Human	Mouse
Entrez	282706	n/a
Ensembl	ENSG00000232307	n/a
UniProt	n a	n/a
RefSeq (mRNA)	NM_172368	n/a
RefSeq (protein)	n/a	n/a
Location (UCSC)	Chr 13: 105.46 – 105.51 Mb	n/a
PubMed search		n/a
- Wikidata
View/Edit Human

In molecular biology, DAOA-AS1, DAOA antisense RNA 1 (non-protein coding), (formerly known as G30), is a human gene encoding a long non-coding RNA. It was originally identified in a screen for genes associated with schizophrenia. It is also associated with bipolar disorder and other psychiatric phenotypes. It may regulate the expression of the DAOA gene.

== See also ==
- D-amino acid oxidase activator
- Long non-coding RNA
