= Postage stamps and postal history of Denmark =

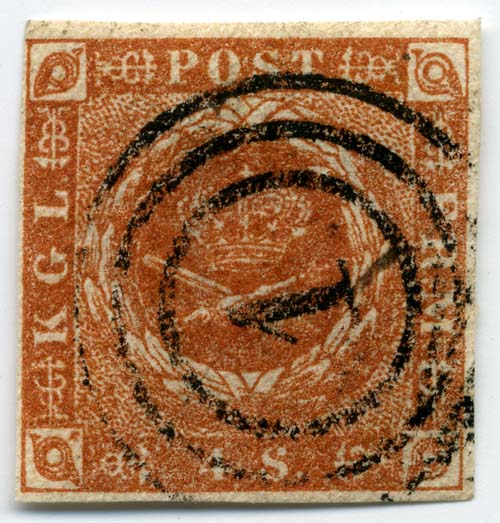
A 4 skilling stamp of 1854

This is an overview of the postage stamps and postal history of Denmark.

== Early postal history ==
Denmark's postal history begins with an ordinance of 24 December 1624 by King Christian IV, establishing a national postal service . This service consisted of nine main routes, and was to be operated by the mayor of Copenhagen and several guilds. Initially the mail was carried by foot, with riders being used after 1640.

The service was turned over to a Paul Klingenberg on 16 July 1653, who introduced a number of innovations, including mail coaches able to carry parcels, and service to Norway. He ran the service until 14 March 1685, when he handed it over to Count Christian Gyldenløve, an eleven-year-old son of King Christian V. The Gyldenløve family continued in control until 1711; in 1694 new routes and rates were established. The state took over control in 1711.

The first steamship carrying mail was the SS Caledonia, which began carrying mail between Copenhagen and Kiel on 1 July 1819.

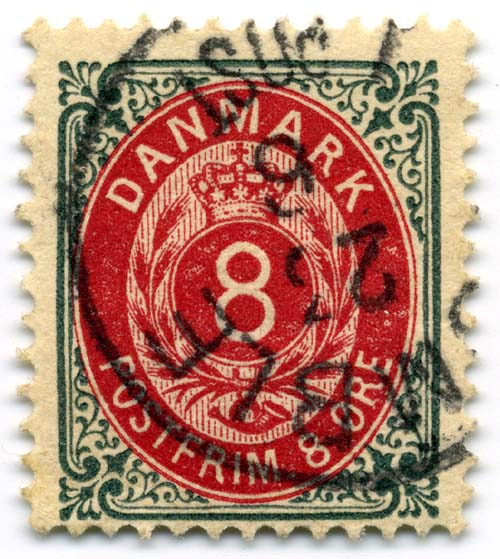
An 8-øre numeral stamp. Perforation is post-1895.

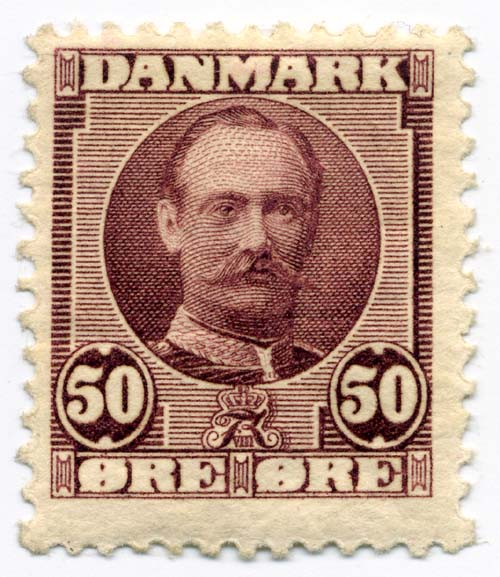
50-øre stamp of Frederik VIII

A 35-øre caravel, 1940 (Type II)

== The classic stamps ==
The first postage stamps were introduced on 1 April 1851, by a law passed on 11 March. The first value was a four (Fire) rigsbankskilling stamp printed in brown, a square design with a crown, sword, and sceptre in the center. This was followed on 1 May by a 2rbs value in blue using the denomination as the design. Both stamps were typographed, watermarked (with a crown), and imperforate, and distinctive for having a yellow-brown burelage printed on top of the design. The 2rbs prepaid the local postage rate in København, while the 4rbs was the national rate. Four rbs stamps were introduced on 1 May 1851 for use in the Duchy of Slesvig.

The design and first printings were made by M. W. Ferslew, but he died and the subsequent printing was by H. H. Thiele, whose firm printed Denmark's stamps for the next 80 years.

Few of the 2rbs values were printed, and today copies are priced at around 3,000 US$ unused and $1,000 used. The 4rbs was more common, with unused at $700 and used copies at just $40.

In 1854 the currency was renamed to just "skilling" and "rigsdaler", and new stamps were printed, still square and using the coat of arms, but with the new currency names, and the inscriptions abbreviated so that they could be read as either Danish or German ("FRM" instead of "FRIMAERKE" for instance). Values of 2s, 4s, 8s, and 16s were issued at various times from 1854 to 1857. In 1858 the dotted pattern in the background was replaced with wavy lines, in 1863 a larger crown was used in the watermark and the stamps were rouletted.

Along with postage stamps, the use of numeral cancellations was adopted, consisting of a number with several concentric circles, each number corresponding to a particular post office. "1" was Copenhagen, "2" the office in Hamburg, "5" Aarhus, and so forth.

The Second War of Schleswig in 1864 was a traumatic loss for Denmark, and immediately after it a new issue of stamps featured the traditional symbols of royalty more prominently than the previous issues. Values of 2s, 3s, 4s, 8s, and 16s came out between May 1864 and 1868. These were the first Danish stamps to be perforated.

== Numeral issues ==
In 1870 the first of the long-running "numeral" issue appeared. The design was an oval with the denomination in large numerals in the center, surrounded by an ornate frame in a different color. The frame is very nearly symmetric, but not entirely, and the sharp-eyed can identify the stamps with inverted frames. Some of the inverts are quite common, the employees at the printing plant presumably also having difficulties knowing which way was up.

In 1873, the currency was changed to the decimal kroner, which necessitated new stamps. The perforation spacing was changed in 1895, and the watermark in 1902.

Meanwhile, in 1882 the Universal Postal Union standardized on particular colors of stamps for international mail. The "Arms type" was designed to meet this requirement; the 5 øre printed in green, and the 20 øre in blue, followed up in 1885 by a 10 øre in red.

== 20th century ==
In 1904, King Christian IX became the first king of Denmark to be depicted on a stamp.

In the following year, a new type of numeral design appeared for the lower values - denomination in an oval with three wavy lines on each side, representing the three waters separating the largest Danish islands. This design proved so popular that variations on it remain in use as of 2003.

In 1907, the Christian IX design was updated with a portrait of the new King, Frederik VIII.

In 1912, several types of stamps were surcharged to 35 øre. In the same year, Denmark's first pictorial stamp was a 5-kroner issue depicting the Copenhagen General Post Office.

King Christian X appeared in profile between 1913 and 1928, in a long-lived series that featured a number of color and value changes.

In 1918, a need for 27 øre value resulted in surcharges on newspaper stamps, some of which are scarce, with prices today of up to 200 US$.

On 5 October 1920, Denmark's first commemorative stamps, a set of three pictorials, marked the reunion of northern Schleswig with Denmark following a plebiscite. 1924 saw commemoratives for the 300th anniversary of the postal service, and in 1926 the original two designs were adapted for an issue noting the 75th anniversary of their introduction.

In 1927 a set of six stamps depicted a caravel, modeled after an old engraving. The 1927 set was typographed; from 1933 to 1940 the design was reissued with the use of engraving instead. The engraved design was soon changed to reduce the left-side margin, with the "Type IIs" having only one column of squares between sail and frame line, where the "Type Is" have two columns. (Both types are common today, except for the type I 25o blue.)

During World War II, Germany occupied Denmark, but the stamp program gives no evidence of that. A new series depicted Christian X full-face instead of in profile, and continued in use after the war. However mail was subject to German postal censorship.

In 1946, a new design appeared for high values; the three lions of the state seal. Like the wavy lines design, this design remained in regular use for the highest denominations into the 1990s.

In 1976 Denmark handed over responsibility for the postal service in the Faroe Islands to Postverk Føroya.

== Modern issues ==
The modern stamp program of Denmark tends to use relatively small stamps produced using engraving. While the quality is high, engraving limits the range of colors available, and so the use of lithography has been creeping into issues, often in addition to engraving. The number of issued stamps has gradually climbed, from 5–10 per year in the 1960s, to around 20 annually in the 1990s, with several thematic sets (usually of four stamps each) per year.

== Postal stationery ==
Postal stationery envelopes were produced in Denmark from 21 December 1864 till 1967; during which time a total of 78 different items were produced. Envelopes were only produced in two values to cover the first weight class for both the local rate and the inland rate. The local postal rate for letters was discontinued after 1 April 1957.

The first letter cards were issued on 3 September 1888. By the time production ceased in 1979 a total of 83 different items had been issued. The postal rates were the same as the envelopes. Letter cards were available at both a local rate and an inland rate. The local rate was discontinued after 1 April 1957.

Postcards first made their appearance in 1871 and are still being produced currently.

Reply-paid postcards or double postcards were in use from 1883 till 1967. Till 1886 they could only be used for inland purposes or to selected countries with whom Denmark had an agreement for their use. From 1886 these cards could be sent to any country in the UPU.

From 28 May 1872 newspaper wrappers were available in three different rates – local, inland and foreign in the first weight class. Newspaper wrappers were discontinued after 1965, during which time a total of 50 different wrappers were issued.

Aerogrammes were first introduced on 9 October 1949 and continue to be available to date.

== See also ==
- Airmail stamps of Denmark
- Joint issues of Denmark

== References and sources ==
Sources

- Stanley Gibbons Ltd: various catalogues
- AskPhil – Glossary of Stamp Collecting Terms
- Encyclopaedia of Postal Authorities
- Rossiter, Stuart & John Flower. The Stamp Atlas. London: Macdonald, 1986. ISBN 0-356-10862-7
- Tester, Henry E. & Glenn F. Hansen. Denmark's Numeral Cancellations 1852–1884. Scandinavian Philatelic Foundation, 1987.
