= List of philatelic bureaus =

This is a list of philatelic bureaus across the world.

In philately, a philatelic bureau is the part of a national postal administration that sells philatelic items to stamp collectors, tourists and stamp dealers.

== Bureaus by country ==
- Afghanistan - Afghan Post
- Albania - Posta Shqiptare
- Algeria - Poste Algérie link Poste Algérie
- Argentina - Correo Argentino
- Australia - Australia Post
- Austria - Austrian Post
- Bangladesh - Bangladesh Post Office
- Barbados - Barbados Postal Service
- Belarus - Belarus Post Belarus Philatelic Bureau
- Belgium - Belgian Post Group
- Belize - Belize Postal Service
- Bhutan - Bhutan Post
- Bosnia and Herzegovina - There are three separate services for Bosnia Herzegovina. - BH Pošta Sarajevo Philatelic Bureau Federation of Bosnia Herzegovina - Hrvatske pošte Mostar Croatian service. - Srpske Pošte Banja Luka Philatelic Bureau Republica Srpska Post office.
- Botswana - Botswana Post
- Brazil - Empresa Brasileira de Correios e Telégrafos in Portuguese
- Bulgaria
- Burundi Philatelic Bureau
- Canada - Canada Post
- Cape Verde - Correios de Cabo Verde in Portuguese
- Chile - Correos de Chile
- China - State Post Bureau site
- Colombia - Correos de Colombia
- Croatia - Hrvatska pošta (Croatian Post)
- Cuba - Correos de Cuba in Spanish, registration is needed
- Cyprus - Cyprus Postal Services
- Denmark - Danmark Post
- Egypt - Egypt Post
- Equatorial Guinea
- Estonia - Eesti Post
- Eritrea
- Ethiopia
- Fiji - Post Fiji
- Finland - Itella
- France - La Poste
- Germany - Deutsche Post
- Gibraltar - Gibraltar Philatelic Bureau
- Guernsey - Guernsey Post
- Guinea
- Guinea Bissau Post Office site
- Faroe Islands - Postverk Føroya
- Hong Kong - Hongkong Post
- India - India Post
- Indonesia - Pos Indonesia
- Iran - Iran Post
- Iraq - Iraqi Telecommunications and Post Company
- Ireland - An Post
- Isle of Man - Isle of Man Post Office
- Italy - Poste Italiane
- Japan - Japan Post
- Jersey - Jersey Post
- Kyrgyzstan - There are two officially designated postal operators: Kyrgyz Pochtasy and Kyrgyz Express Post
- Macau - Correios de Macau
- Malaysia - Pos Malaysia
- Malta - Malta Post
- Monaco - La Poste de Monaco
- Montenegro
- Montserrat - Montserrat Stamp Bureau
- Nepal - Nepal Post
- Netherlands - PostNL
- New Zealand - New Zealand Post - Auckland City Stamps
- North Macedonia - North Macedonia Post
- Norway - Posten Norge
- Pakistan - Pakistan Post
- Palau
- Palestinian National Authority - Palestine Post
- Philippines - Philippine Postal Corporation
- Poland - Polish Post
- Russia - Russian Post Official philatelic seller
- San Marino - Poste sammarinesi
- Saudi Arabia - Saudi Post
- Senegal
- Serbia Philatelic site
- Singapore - Singapore Post
- Slovenia
- Slovakia
- Solomon Islands - Solopost
- Somalia - Somali Postal Service
- Sri Lanka - Sri Lanka Post
- Swaziland
- Switzerland
- Thailand - Thailand Post
- Tunisia
- Turkey
- Tuvalu - Tuvalu Philatelic Bureau
- Ukraine - Ukrposhta
- United Kingdom - Royal Mail (Crown Dependencies and British Overseas Territories are separate)
- United States of America - United States Postal Service
- Vanuatu
- Vatican City State - Poste Vaticane
- Vietnam
- Uruguay Philatelic shop
- Zambia
- Zimbabwe - ZimPost
