= PostEurop =

Coordinates: 50.84292078245073°N 4.406514846338855°E

- Formation: 1993
- Headquarters: Boulevard Brand Whitlock 114
- Location: Brussels, Belgium
- Members: 54 countries
- Secretary General: Botond Szebeny
- Website: www.posteurop.org

PostEurop is the association of European public postal operators, one of the constituent unions of the Universal Postal Union. PostEurop was created in 1993 to simplify the exchange of mail in Europe, a task previously undertaken by the European Conference of Postal and Telecommunications Administrations (CEPT, from its French acronym). A smaller but similar organization is the Small European Postal Administration Cooperation.

Historical logo

PostEurop's headquarters are in Brussels, Belgium.

Since 1993 PostEurop has co-ordinated the annual issue of Europa postage stamps, previously a CEPT function.

== Members ==
Country	Postal organisation	Year
Albania	Posta Shqiptare	1993
Armenia	HayPost	2007
Austria	Austrian Post	1993
Azerbaijan	Azərpoçt	1993
Belarus	Belposhta (suspended)	2008
Belgium	Bpost	1993
Bosnia and Herzegovina	BH Pošta	1996
Bosnia and Herzegovina	Hrvatska pošta Mostar	2008
Bosnia and Herzegovina	Pošte Srpske	2008
Bulgaria	Bulgarian Posts	1993
Croatia	Hrvatska pošta	1993
Cyprus	Cyprus Postal Services	1993
Czech Republic	Česká pošta	1993
Denmark	Post Danmark	1993
Estonia	Omniva	1994
Finland	Posti Group	1993
France	La Poste	1993
Georgia	Georgian Post	2012
Germany	Deutsche Post DHL	1993
Great Britain	Royal Mail	1993
Greece	Hellenic Post-ELTA	1993
Guernsey	Guernsey Post	1995
Hungary	Magyar Posta	1993
Iceland	Íslandspóstur	1993
Ireland	An Post	1993
Isle of Man	Isle of Man Post Office	1995
Italy	Poste italiane	1993
Jersey	Jersey Post	1995
Kazakhstan	Kazpost	2010
Latvia	Latvijas Pasts	1993
Liechtenstein	Liechtensteinische Post	1993
Lithuania	Lietuvos paštas	1993
Luxembourg	P&T Luxembourg	1993
Malta	MaltaPost	1993
Moldova	Poșta Moldovei	1996
Monaco	La Poste Monaco	1994
Montenegro	Pošta Crne Gore	2008
Netherlands	PostNL	1993
North Macedonia	North Macedonia Post	1996
Norway	Posten Norge	1993
Poland	Poczta Polska	1993
Portugal	CTT Correios de Portugal	1993
Romania	Poșta Română	1993
Russia	Russian Post (suspended)	1994
San Marino	Poste San Marino	1994
Serbia	Pošta Srbije	2003
Slovakia	Slovenská pošta	1993
Slovenia	Pošta Slovenije	1993
Spain	Correos y Telégrafos	1993
Sweden	PostNord Sverige	1993
Switzerland	Swiss Post	1993
Turkey	Turkish PTT	1993
Ukraine	Ukrposhta	1994
Vatican City	Poste Vaticane	2012
Åland	Posten Åland	2013

== See also ==
- List of national postal services#Europe
- Small European Postal Administration Cooperation
