= SEPAC =

SEPAC may refer to

- Small European Postal Administration Cooperation
- Space Experiments with Particle Accelerators, see STS-45
