= La Poste Monaco =

Postal service company of the Principality of Monaco

- Company type: Subsidiary
- Industry: Postal services, courier
- Founded: 1937; 89 years ago
- Headquarters: Palais de la Scala; Monte-Carlo, Monaco
- Number of locations: 7 post offices
- Services: Letter post, parcel service, banking, insurance
- Parent: La Poste
- Website: lapostemonaco.mc

La Poste Monaco (French pronunciation: [la pɔst mɔnako]) is the company responsible for postal service in the microstate principality of Monaco. Despite Monaco being an independent nation, under an agreement with France, the company is a subsidiary of the French post office, La Poste.

La Poste Monaco operates seven post offices at various locations within principality; one in each of the wards of La Condamine, Fontvieille, Les Moneghetti, Monaco-Ville and three including the company's headquarters at Palais de la Scala in Monte Carlo. The post offices sell typical postal products, such as postage stamps and flat rate envelopes which can be used to send up to 1 kg (2.2 lbs), and envelopes with postage pre-applied. Post offices in Monaco also offer post box services, They also offer commercial banking services through the French post bank La Banque Postale with some branches having ATMs, and as a outlet for mobile phone SIM cards for the Monegasque operator Monaco Telecom.

Although Monegasque post boxes are from the same stock as French post boxes, they are distinctively coloured in the principality's national colours of red and white, instead of the yellow of French post boxes. The post boxes also have a notice reminding that only Monegasque stamps are valid when using them, despite the rates being the same as in France.

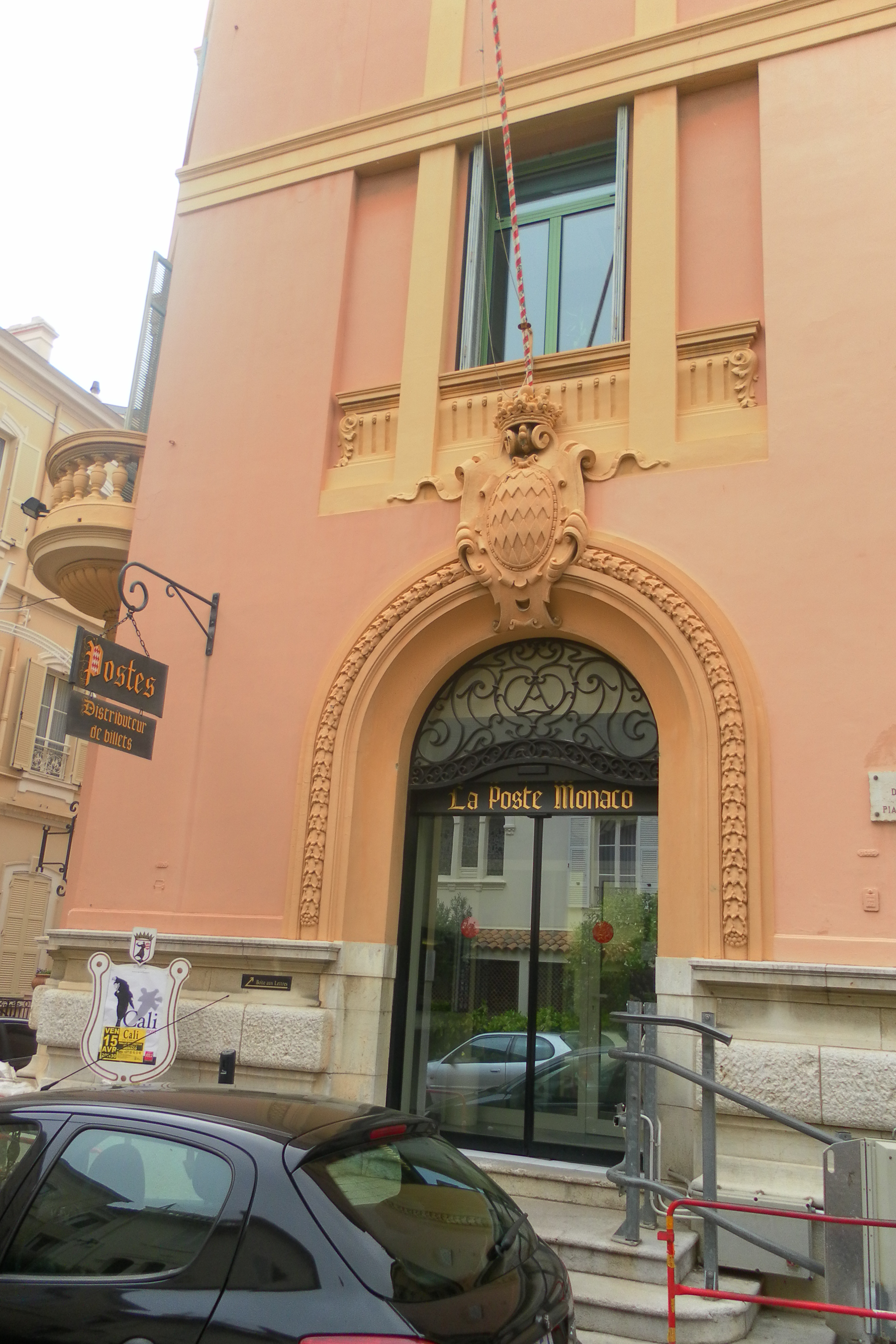
A post office in Monaco-Ville.

== History ==
Postal services in Monaco are provided by France pursuant to the Treaty of Péronne in 1641. This relationship has been interrupted twice. The first interruption occurred during the French Revolution, when the National Convention on 27 October 1793 integrated the Principality of Monaco into the territory of France. This arrangement lasted until the enactment of the Treaty of Paris on 30 May 1814, which reestablished the principality under its previous borders and independent government by the Grimaldi family.

The second interruption occurred just shortly after as a result of the next Treaty of Paris on 20 November 1815, which made Monaco a protectorate of the Kingdom of Sardinia. This led to the Monegasque postal system becoming Sardinian from the signing of the Treaty of Stupinigi, which took effect on 1 January 1818, until the signing of the Treaty of Turin on 24 March 1860, again making Monaco a principality of France, and restoring the postal relationship.

Monaco created its first stamps in July 1885 under Charles III, although the country's postal service at the time was still technically French. The post office didn't became an independent subsidiary until 1937 under Prince Louis II. Monaco became a member of the Universal Postal Union in 1955, joined PostEurop in 1993 and became of founder member of the Small European Postal Administration Cooperation in 1999.

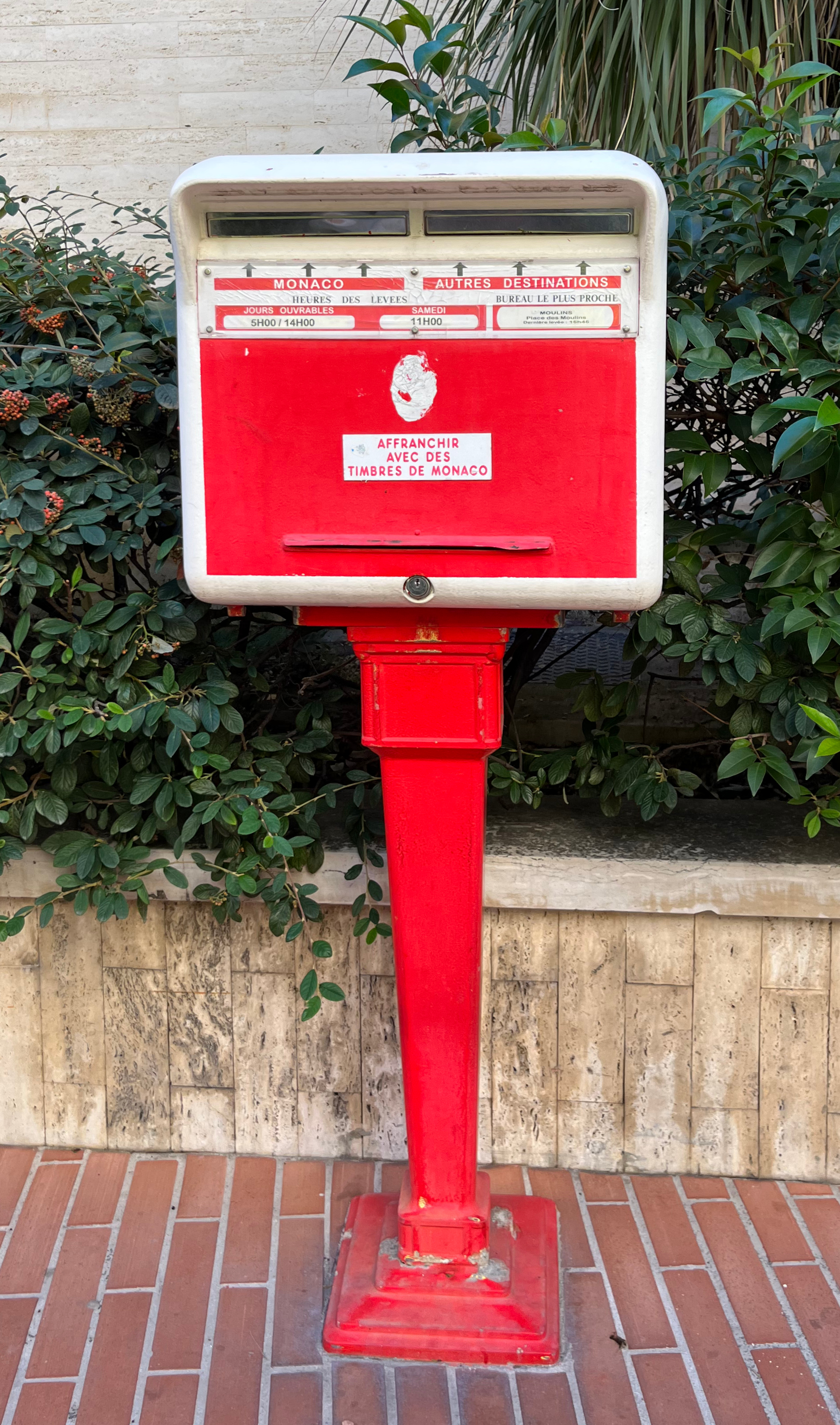
A Monegasque post box, in its distinctive red and white colours.

== See also ==
- Postal codes in Monaco
- Postage stamps and postal history of Monaco
- Museum of Stamps and Coins
- Club de Monte-Carlo, a Monegasque philatelic club
