= Postage stamps and postal history of Monaco =

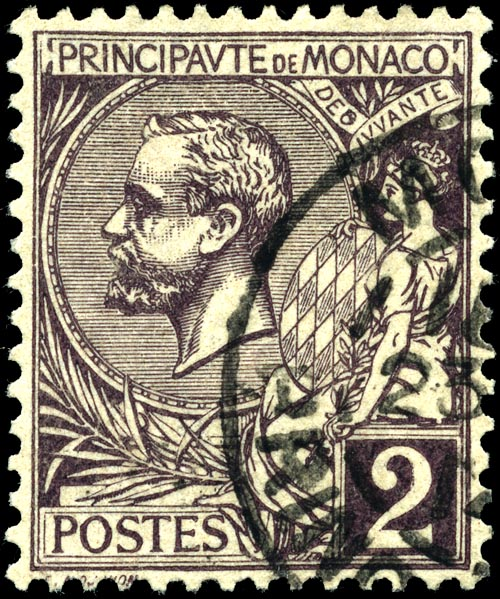
A 2 centimes stamp, issued in 1891

A Monaco postage stamp of Princess Grace designed by Czesław Słania, which was issued as part of the 1996 Europa postage stamp series honoring famous women

The postal history of Monaco can be traced to the principality's first postmark in 1704. Stampless covers are known with both manuscript and handstamp postmarks for Monaco and Fort d'Hercule (1793–1814 French occupation); as the principality was once much larger, postmarks of the communes of Menton and Roquebrune prior to their 1848 secession might also be included. Monaco used Sardinian stamps from 1851 until 1860, when by the Treaty of Turin, Sardinia ceded to France the surrounding county of Nice and relinquished its protectorate over Monaco; French stamps with Monaco or Monte-Carlo postmarks were used thereafter. Two forms of cancellation are known for the French period. With the first, the postmark is on the cover away from the stamps; an obliterator with an identifying post office number 4222, or later 2387, inside a diamond of ink dots cancelled the actual stamps. The second applied the postmark directly on the stamps, as both a date stamp and cancel. All of these postal forerunners, particularly usages of Sardinian stamps with Monaco cancels, are far more valuable than the same stamps postally used in the issuing countries.

The first Monegasque postage stamps were issued on 1 July 1885, and featured the image of Prince Charles III of Monaco.

In 1937, the Principality responded to a growing interest from philatelists by creating a Stamp Issuing Office. The 1949 accession of Prince Rainier III led to increased importance for the principality's philatelic issues. During his reign, the prince was personally involved in all aspects of the design and format of the principality's philatelic issues, and he was quoted as stating that stamps were “the best ambassador of a country.” The prince was a noted philatelist and his collection was the basis of Monaco's Museum of Stamps and Coins.

Monaco joined the Universal Postal Union in 1955 and PostEurop in 1993. Monaco's postage stamps, which are tied to French postal rate, continue to be popular among collectors and are considered to be a source of revenue for the principality.

== See also ==
- La Poste Monaco
- Museum of Stamps and Coins
