= Small European Postal Administration Cooperation =

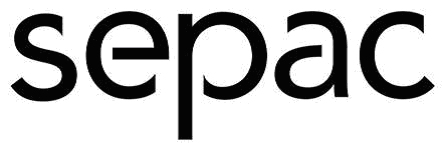
SEPAC logo

The Small European Postal Administration Cooperation (SEPAC; also "...Cooperations"; also Small European Postal Administrations Cooperation) is an association of 13 European postal authorities: Åland, the Faroe Islands, Gibraltar, Greenland, Guernsey, Ireland, the Isle of Man, Jersey, Liechtenstein, Luxembourg, Malta, Monaco, and Vatican City. Luxembourg was not originally a member of SEPAC but it joined at the end of 2006. San Marino decided to leave and is no longer a member, as of March 2020. SEPAC is smaller than PostEurop. Iceland stopped issuing stamps in 2020.

The first joint issue of SEPAC postage stamps occurred on October 1, 2007, and the next in 2009; the sixth one was in September 2015. San Marino and Vatican City do not participate in these issues.

The following criteria are requisites for membership:

- The postal administration must be located in Europe.
- The postal administration must be independent.
- The postal administration must have a small market with more than 50% of its philatelic customers living outside the country.

The Secretary of SEPAC is Andrée Valentine, Jersey Post's Head of Philatelic Services.

== Member organisations ==
Country	Postal organisation
Åland Islands	Posten Åland
Alderney	Alderney Post
Faroe Islands	Postverk Føroya
Gibraltar	Royal Gibraltar Post Office
Greenland	Post Greenland
Guernsey	Guernsey Post
Ireland	An Post
Isle of Man	Isle of Man Post
Jersey	Jersey Post
Liechtenstein	Liechtensteinische Post
Luxembourg	Post Luxembourg
Malta	Malta Post
Monaco	La Poste de Monaco
Sark	Sark Post
Vatican City	Poste Vaticane

== Common theme issues of SEPAC ==
A 2020 Faroe Islands stamp, issued as part of a SEPAC collaboration

Year	Participating countries	Topic
2007	11	Scenery I
2009	12	Scenery II
2011	12	Scenery III
2013	12	Animals
2014	12	Flowers
2015	12	Culture
2016	12	Seasons
2017	12	Local handcrafts
2018	12	Spectacular views
2019	11	Old residential houses
2020	11	Art from the state collection
2021	10	Historical maps
2022	9	Local beverages
2023	9	Traditional markets
