= Postage stamps and postal history of Vatican City =

Coordinates: 41°54′15″N 12°27′22″E

1929 Vatican City postage stamp featuring the image of Pope Pius XI

The Vatican postal service, Poste Vaticane, has operated its own postal service and issued its own postage stamps since 1929.

The postal history of Vatican City begins shortly after its official foundation on 11 February 1929. Two days later, the Vatican post office began operating with supplies and equipment donated by the Italian government. Vatican City became a member of the Universal Postal Union on 1 June, and then on 29 July Vatican City and Italy signed a postal agreement, going into effect on 1 August, providing for the routing of its mail through Rome.

== First stamps ==
The first of August also saw the issuance of the first Vatican stamps (Italian stamps were used previously), in the "Conciliation" definitive series of 15 values. The low values, 5 to 75 centesmi, depicted the heraldic arms, while the higher values (80 centesmi to 10 lira) featured a full-face portrait of the reigning Pope Pius XI.

== Later issues ==
On 1 April 1933, the Vatican issued its first semi-postal stamps, a set of four marking the 24th Holy Year. On 31 May of the same year, the "Gardens and Medallions" definitives were issued. While the lowest value still depicted the coat of arms, higher values included views of the gardens and of St Peter's.

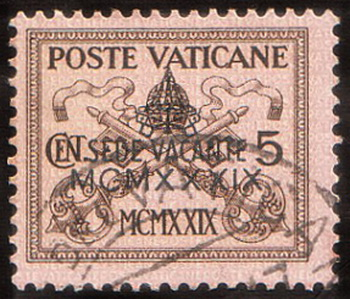
A Vatican stamp overprinted "SEDE VACANTE / MCMXXXIX" in 1939

On 18 February 1939, just a little after Pius XI's death on 10 February, the arms stamps of 1929 were overprinted "SEDE VACANTE / MCMXXXIX". They remained valid until 3 March, the day after the election of Pope Pius XII.

== Today ==
The Vatican has acquired a reputation for producing handsome and attractive issues in limited quantities (even today, the average production run for most issues is only between 300,000 and 500,000 stamps). Vatican stamps are produced under the authority of the Philatelic and Numismatic Office of the Vatican City State.

Much, but by no means all, of the mail handled by the Vatican is from tourists or official congregations of the Roman Curia. Many Romans, distrustful of the unreliable Italian post office, make weekly trips to the Vatican just to post their important letters. Italian stamps may not be used on Vatican mail nor vice versa. According to the Universal Postal Union, the Vatican post office is "one of the best postal systems in the world" and "more letters are sent each year, per inhabitant, from the Vatican's 00120 postal code than from anywhere else in the world."

== See also ==
- Poste Vaticane
- Index of Vatican City-related articles

== References and sources ==
Notes

Sources

- Bolaffi catalog
- Michel catalog
- Sassone catalog
- Unificato catalog
