= Isle of Man Post Office =

- Company type: Government owned
- Traded as: Isle of Man Post
- Industry: Postal service
- Founded: 5 July 1973
- Headquarters: Douglas, Isle of Man
- Area served: Isle of Man, United Kingdom of Great Britain and Northern Ireland, Worldwide
- Key people: Stu Peters MHK (Chairman); Diane Kelsey MLC (Vice-Chairman)
- Services: Postal/Parcel delivery/Collecting
- Owner: Isle of Man Government
- Website: iompost.com

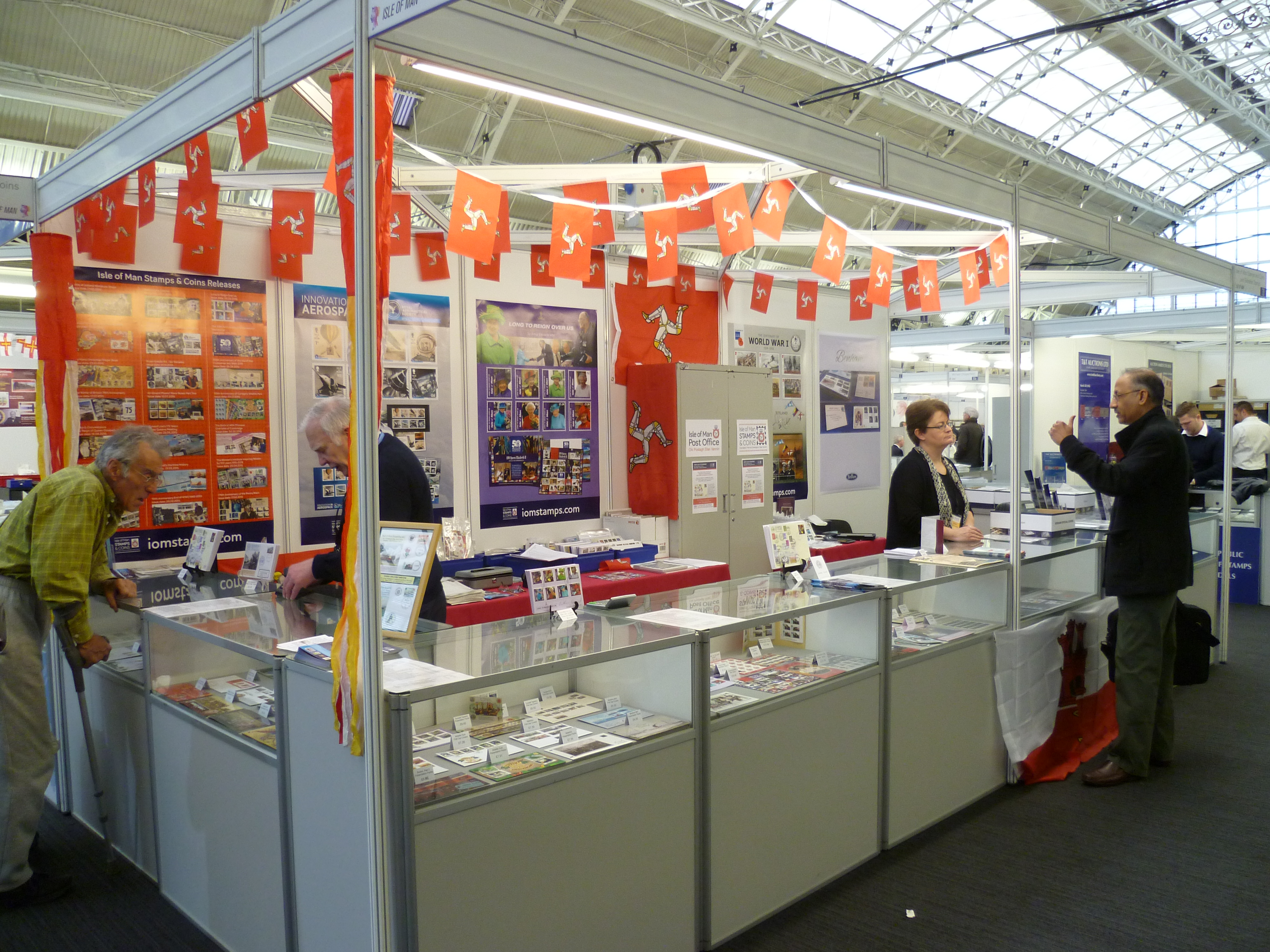
The Isle of Man Post Office at Spring Stampex 2016.

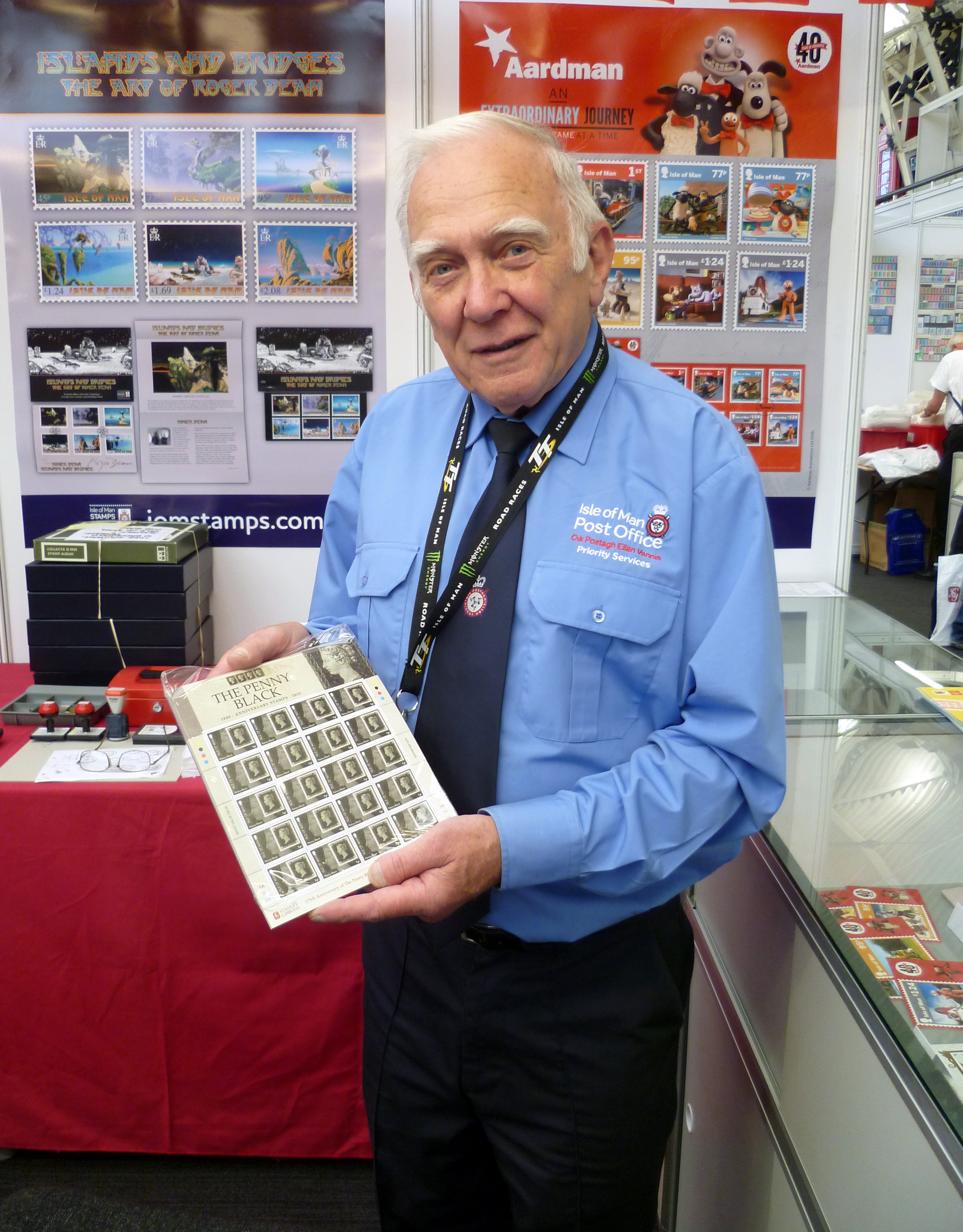
An Isle of Man Post Office employee with a sheet of stamps issued in 2015 to mark the 175th anniversary of the issue of the Penny Black.

The Isle of Man Post Office (Manx: Oik Postagh Ellan Vannin), which formerly used the trading name Isle of Man Post, operates postal collection, ancillary mail services, philatelic goods and delivery services and post office counter services on the Isle of Man.

== History ==
The Isle of Man's postal service was originally operated by the United Kingdom's General Post Office (GPO), with a daily postal connection with the UK since 1879. In 1966, the UK Government commenced planning to convert the General Post Office into a public corporation, and as part of this process offered each of the Crown Dependencies the opportunity to assume control of the operations of the GPO on their territories. On 18 October 1968, Tynwald decided that they did not wish to take up the offer, but provision was made in the Post Office Act 1969 nonetheless.

In the Channel Islands, the authorities did accept the offer, and postal activities of the GPO were transferred in October 1969 to form Jersey Post and Guernsey Post. The GPO had not provided any telecommunications services in the Channel Islands since the 1920s.

In 1972, following negotiations by Tynwald with the GPO to leave the Island's telephone system, it was agreed that the Isle of Man would, after all, take over control of the insular postal administration. As a result, the Isle of Man Post Office Authority was formed and took over the postal assets and functions of the Post Office on 5 July 1973. The monies paid for the assets of the Post Office, £148,624, were recouped within the first year from the surpluses generated by the Authority. It was reconstituted as a Statutory Board and renamed the 'Isle of Man Post Office' under the Post Office Act 1993.

=== Telecommunications ===
Telecommunications remained the responsibility of the British Post Office until 1981, when British Telecom was created. In 1987, telecommunications were transferred to the local company Manx Telecom, which was initially a wholly owned subsidiary of BT, but became a subsidiary of O2.

== Stamps ==
Stamps marked with the name of the Isle of Man were first issued in 1971; the first issue was a variant of the 'Machin' design. Since 1973 only Manx stamps have been valid on the island, and Manx stamps are not valid for postage in the UK or elsewhere. Isle of Man stamps have since become popular with philatelists.

== Postal rates ==
When sending mail to the Island from elsewhere, the Isle of Man is treated as though it were part of the United Kingdom, and mail from the UK continues to be charged at Royal Mail's UK inland rates. However, postcodes were not introduced in the Isle of Man until 1993, when the Island was postcoded as the IM postcode area as an extension of the United Kingdom postcode system.

Mail sent from the Island to the UK is sailed across the Irish Sea, and enters the first-class stream of the Royal Mail for next-day delivery.

The Isle of Man Post Office is a member of the Small European Postal Administration Cooperation.

== Post Offices ==
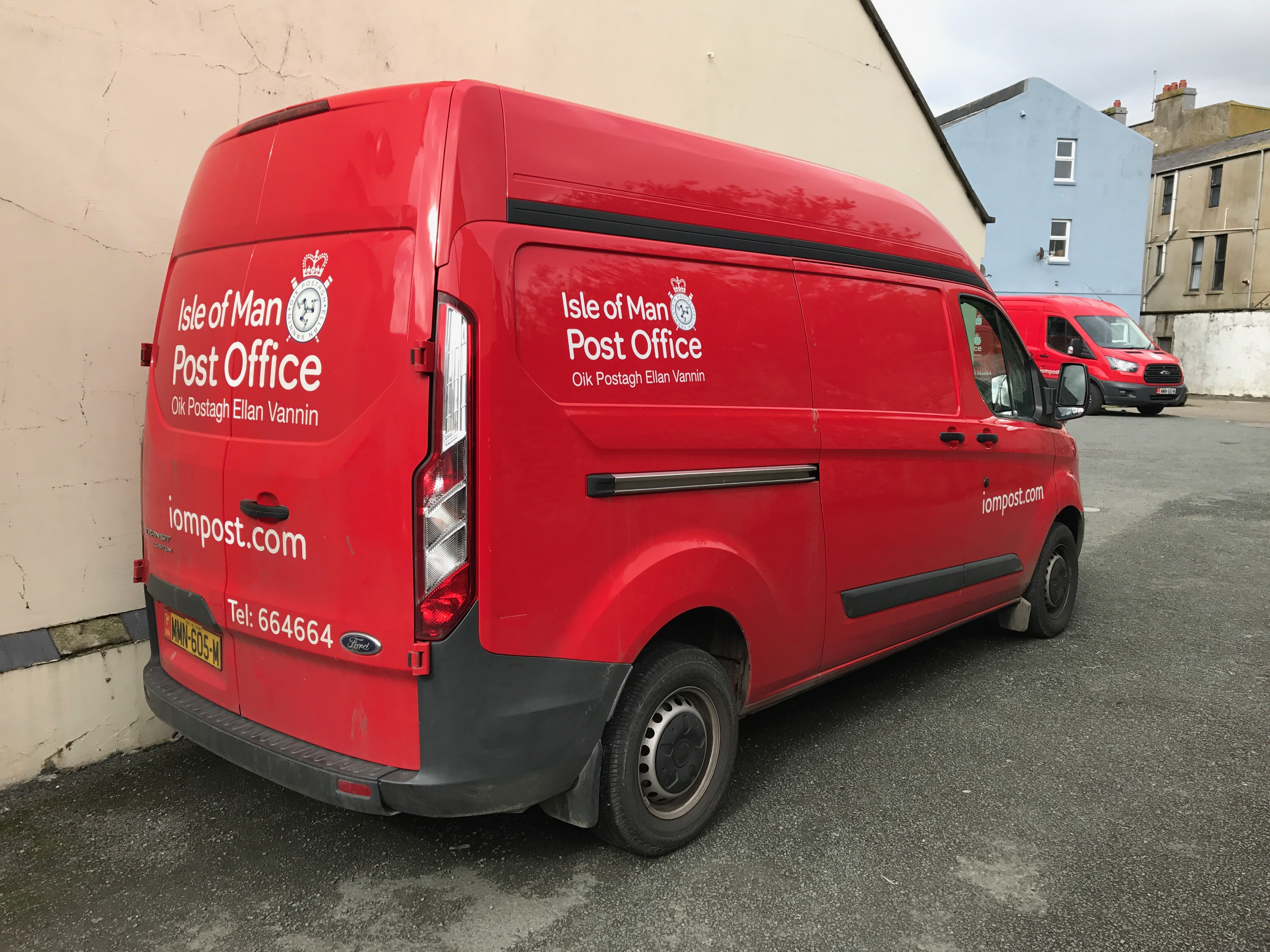
Two delivery vehicles of the Isle of Man Post Office in the Post Office yard at Peel.

The Isle of Man Post Office has Crown offices at Douglas and Ramsey. There are also post offices in the other principal towns of Peel, Port Erin and Castletown, as well as a number of sub post offices in smaller communities.

== Chairs ==
- Charles Faragher, 1984–1986
- Bernie May, 1986–1988
- Norman Butler, 1988–1991
- David Cretney, 1992–1996
- Alex Downie, 1997–1999
- John Shimmin, 1999–2003
- Edgar Quine, 2003–2004
- Pamela Crowe MLC, 2004–08
- Alan Crowe MLC, 2008–2011
- Geoff Corkish MHK, 2011–2014
- Graham Cregeen MHK, 2014–2016
- Julie Edge MHK, 2017–2022
- Chris Thomas MHK, 2022–2022
- Stu Peters MHK, 2022–present

== See also ==
- Communications on the Isle of Man
- Country definitives
- Postage stamps and postal history of the Isle of Man
