= Philatelic and Numismatic Office of the Vatican City State =

Vatican office that issues stamps and coins

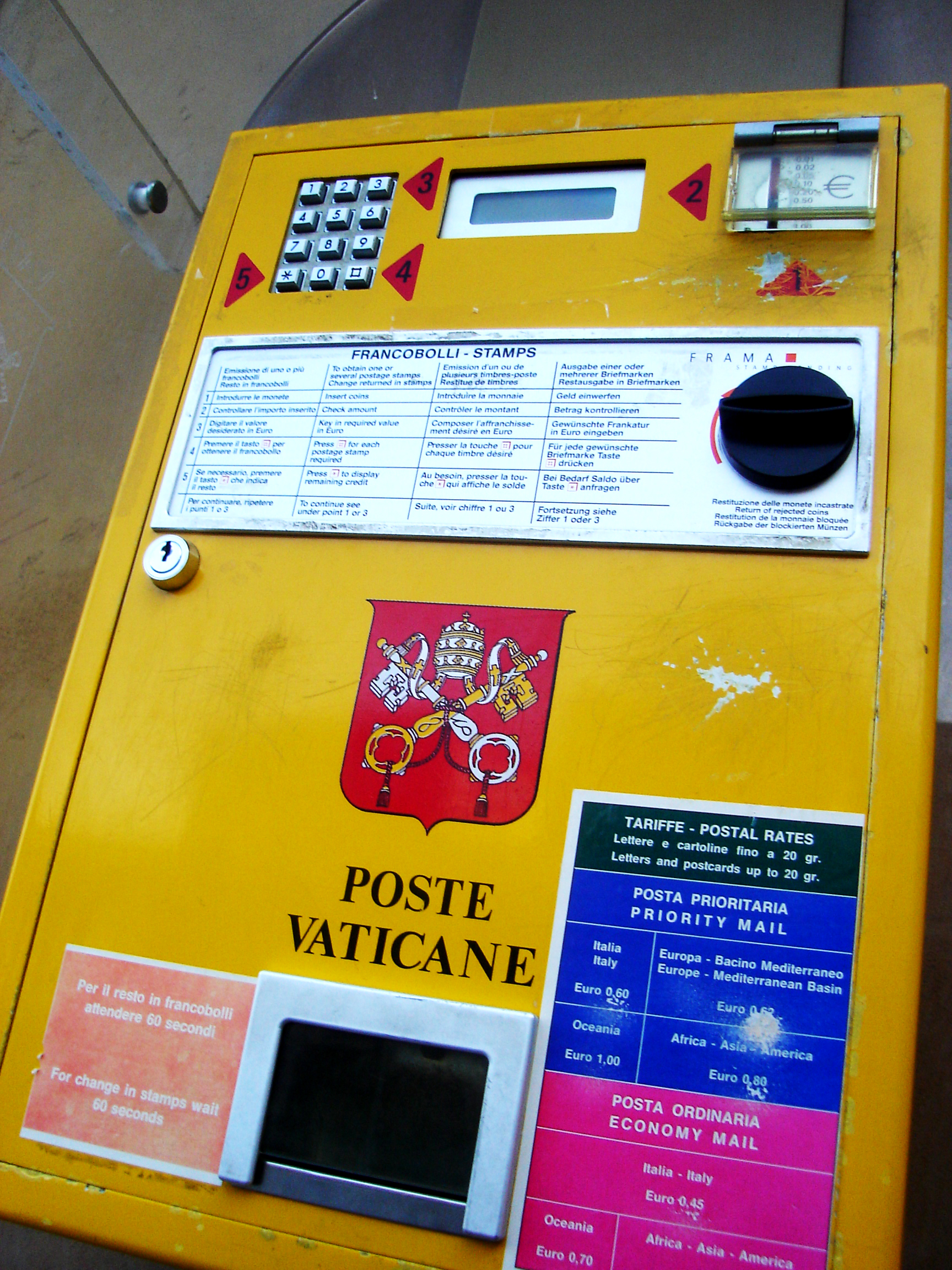
The stamp vending machine of the Vatican Postal Service

The Philatelic and Numismatic Office of the Vatican City State (Italian: Ufficio Filatelico e Numismatico), managed by Poste Vaticane, is responsible for issuing Vatican postal stamps and Vatican coins.

The office was created on 11 February 1929 on the state's founding, and issued the first of its postal stamps on 1 August of the same year. While Vatican stamps may only be used within the Vatican City State and the quantity of euro coins is limited by treaty with Italy (the total value of all coins minted in 2002 was restricted to €310,400), Vatican coins and stamps serve as an important sign of Vatican sovereignty, and their scarcity and design makes them popular with collectors.

Public interest in Vatican currency and stamps was considered sufficient to justify a Philatelic and Numismatic Museum (Il Museo Filatelico e Numismatico) which is located in a portion of the Vatican Railway station and has been operated as part of the Vatican Museums since 2007. Two special stamps were issued to commemorate the museum's opening. Euro coins issued by the Vatican are minted by Italy's Istituto Poligrafico e Zecca dello Stato (Italian State Mint).

In 2017, the Vatican honored the 500th anniversary of Protestant Reformation by issuing stamps featuring Martin Luther.

There are four post offices open to the public in the Vatican. Post boxes in the Vatican are painted yellow, but use a different design to those in Italy. The whole country is located in one postal code, which is 00120. More mail is sent per inhabitant from this postal code than from anywhere else in the world.

== See also ==
- Postage stamps and postal history of Vatican City
- Poste Vaticane
- Vatican euro coins
- Vatican lira
- List of mints
- Index of Vatican City-related articles
- Outline of Vatican City
