= Omniva =

Estonian state-owned logistics and postal company

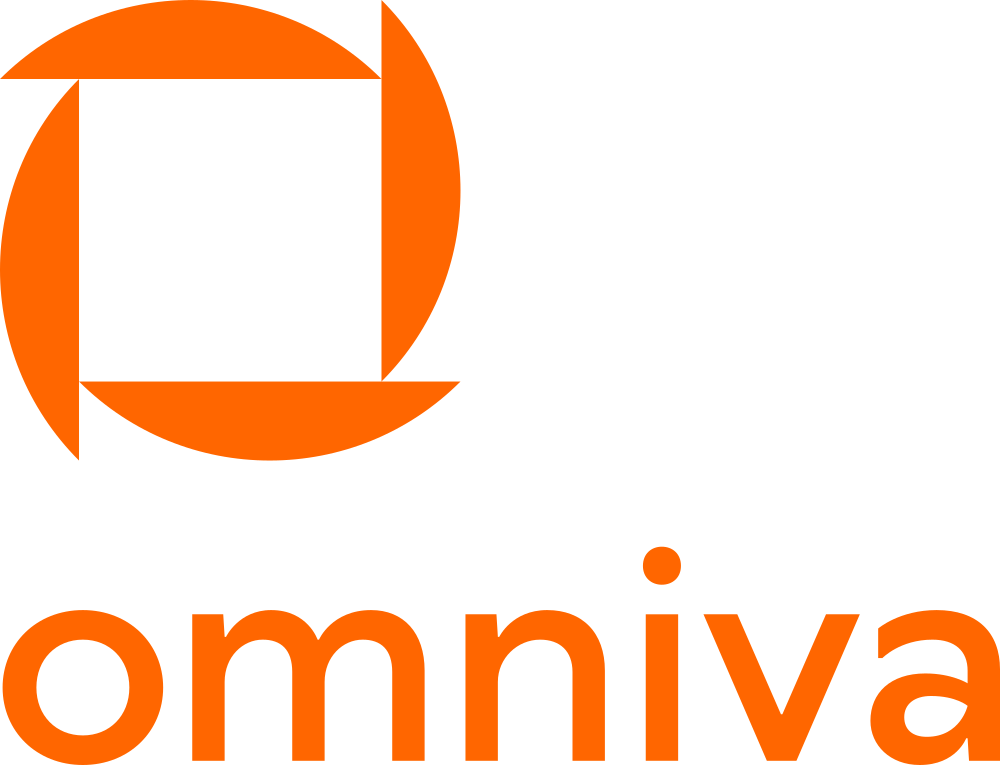
- Predecessor: Eesti Post
- Founded: 1638
- Headquarters: Tallinn, Estonia
- Area served: Baltic states and international markets
- Brands: Omniva
- Revenue: €154.7 million (2025)
- Owner: Republic of Estonia
- Number of employees: 2,200+
- Parent: AS Eesti Post
- Website: www.omnivagroup.com

Omniva is an Estonian state-owned logistics and postal services technology group operating in the Baltic states and international markets. The Omniva brand is used by AS Eesti Post, which is wholly owned by the Republic of Estonia. The group provides postal and parcel delivery services, e-logistics solutions and technology-based delivery services. It operates more than 2,500 parcel lockers across the Baltic states, making it the region's densest parcel locker network.

The Omniva Group comprises the parent company AS Eesti Post and its subsidiaries Finbite OÜ, Picapac OÜ, Omniva SIA, Omniva LT UAB, and Omniva LT Sorting UAB.

== History ==
The origins of postal services in present-day Estonia date back to the 17th century, when a formal postal network was established under Swedish rule. In 1638, a public postal route connecting Tallinn and Narva was opened, forming part of a broader regional communication system in Northern Europe.

Following periods under Swedish, Russian, and later Soviet administration, Estonia re-established an independent national postal system after regaining independence in 1991. The state-owned enterprise Eesti Post was founded to provide universal postal services and to rebuild national logistics infrastructure in a newly independent Estonia.

Throughout the 1990s and early 2000s, Eesti Post focused on modernising postal operations, expanding service networks, and integrating into international postal systems, including cooperation within the Universal Postal Union and European postal organisations. During this period, the company also began introducing financial and digital services alongside traditional mail delivery.

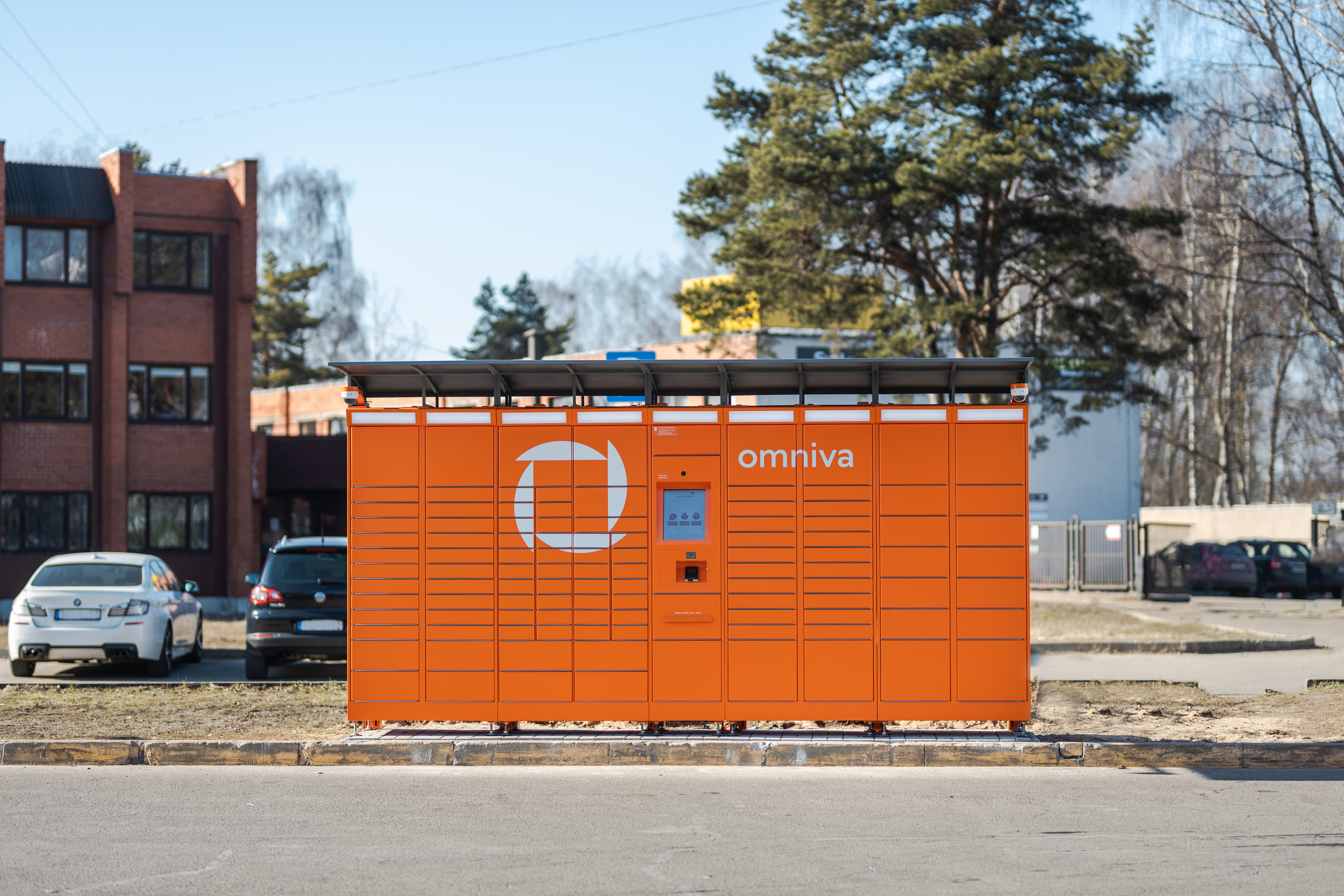
Omniva parcel machine

In the 2010s, the rapid growth of e-commerce significantly transformed the company's operations. Eesti Post expanded its parcel delivery capabilities and invested in automated parcel locker networks across Estonia and neighbouring Baltic countries. These parcel machines became a central component of last-mile delivery infrastructure in the region.

In 2014, Eesti Post rebranded its international operations under the name Omniva, reflecting a strategic shift towards cross-border logistics and e-commerce services. The Omniva brand was gradually adopted as the primary identity for the group, while Eesti Post continued to be used in certain domestic contexts.

During the late 2010s and early 2020s, Omniva expanded its presence beyond the Baltic states, developing logistics connections and operational capabilities in other international markets. The company continued investing in sorting infrastructure, digital solutions, and parcel automation to support growing cross-border e-commerce volumes.

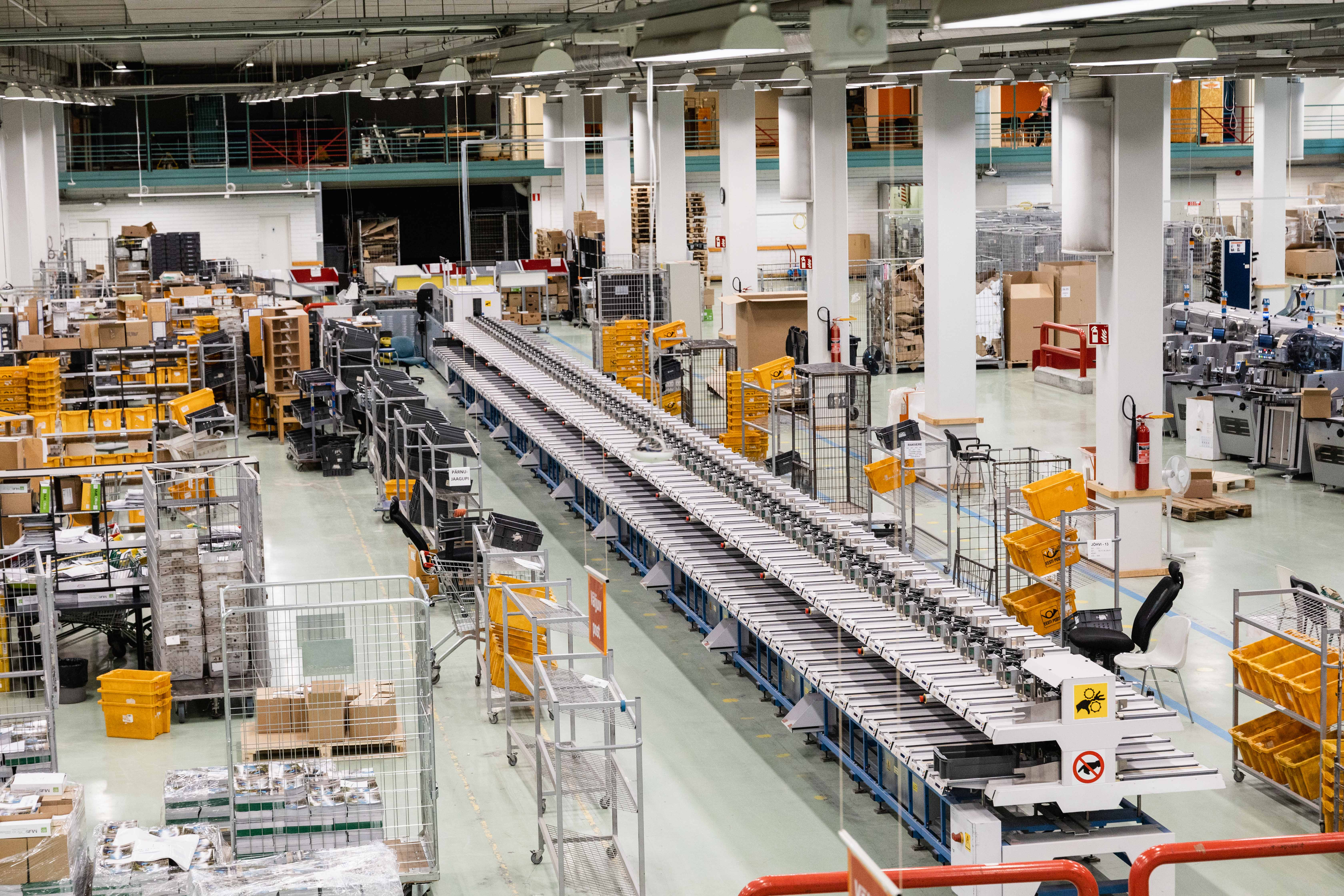
Omniva sorting center in Pallasti, Estonia

By the 2020s, Omniva had evolved from a traditional postal operator into a regional logistics and e-commerce service provider, with a focus on parcel delivery, parcel locker networks, and digital logistics services, while continuing to fulfil its role as Estonia's universal postal service provider.

== Operations ==
Omniva operates parcel, courier, postal, and international logistics services in Estonia, Latvia, Lithuania, and other markets.

According to the company's fourth-quarter 2025 interim report, Omniva handled 50.3 million parcels in 2025 and generated revenue of €154.7 million, with net profit of €5.9 million.

== Infrastructure ==
Omniva's logistics network includes sorting and logistics facilities in Estonia, Latvia, and Lithuania. In September 2024, the company opened a 22,000-square-metre automated logistics centre in Kaunas, Lithuania. According to Omniva, the facility can sort up to 12,000 parcels per hour and serves as a regional hub for Baltic parcel flows.

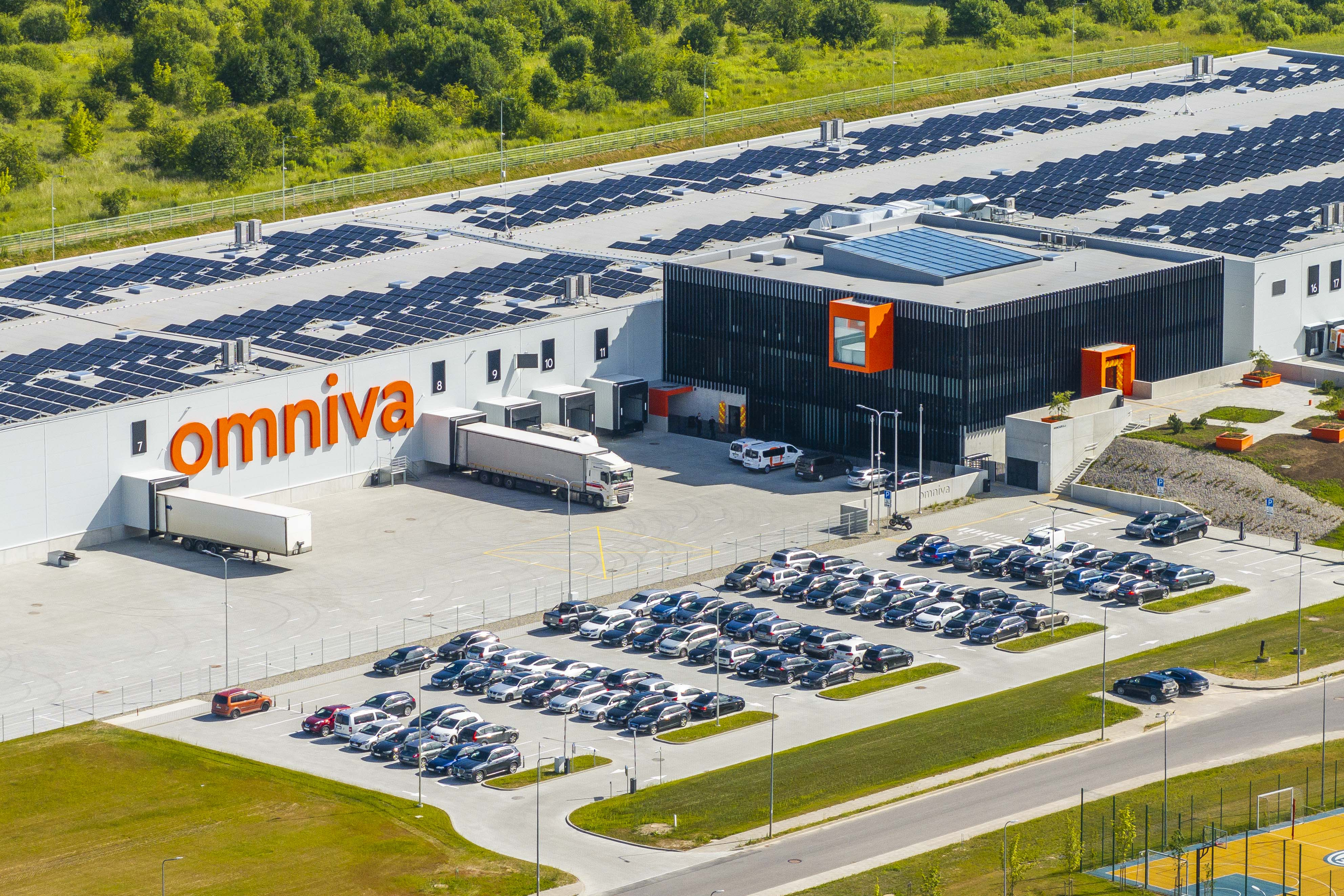
Omniva sorting center in Kaunas, Lithuania

== Parcel locker network ==
Omniva operates a large parcel locker network in the Baltic region. In 2024, the company stated that after adding 135 parcel machines, its network comprised 1,321 parcel machines and 172,000 locker compartments.

The company has also developed smaller community parcel lockers intended for less densely populated areas and neighbourhoods where standard parcel machines may be less viable.

== Services ==
Omniva provides domestic and international parcel delivery, courier services, postal services, periodicals delivery, cross-border e-commerce logistics and international transit services. The company operates an extensive network of automated parcel lockers enabling self-service parcel collection, sending and returns across the Baltic states.

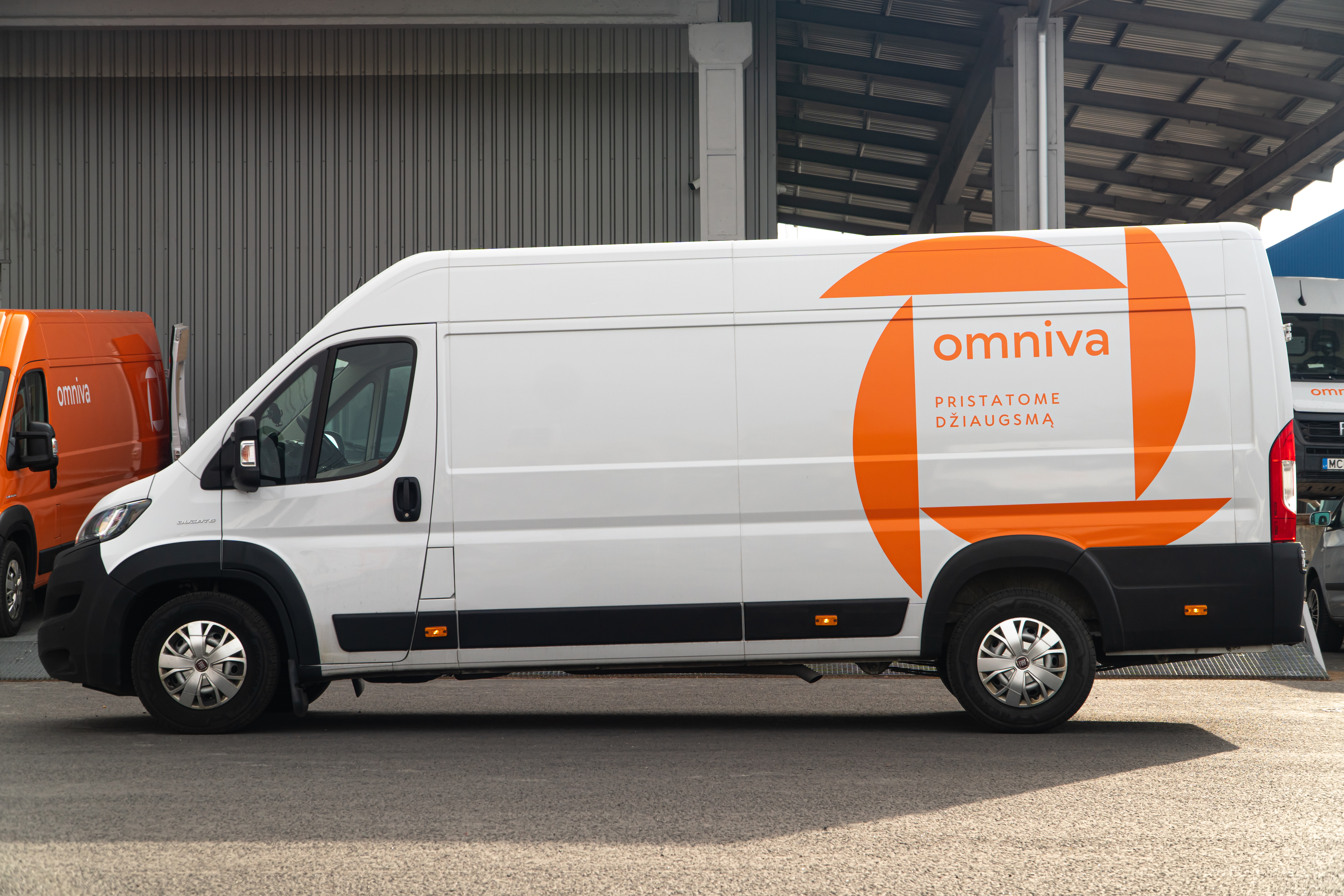
Omniva delivery van

In addition to parcel delivery, Omniva provides universal postal services in Estonia, including letter mail and periodical delivery. Its logistics network is supported by automated sorting systems and digital platforms that enable shipment management, parcel tracking and delivery notifications.

== Innovation and technology ==
Omniva has introduced several technology-led logistics initiatives, including self-service parcel management tools, Crowd Delivery – a crowdsourced parcel delivery platform that enables private individuals to deliver parcels through a mobile application, and pilot projects involving autonomous delivery vehicles.

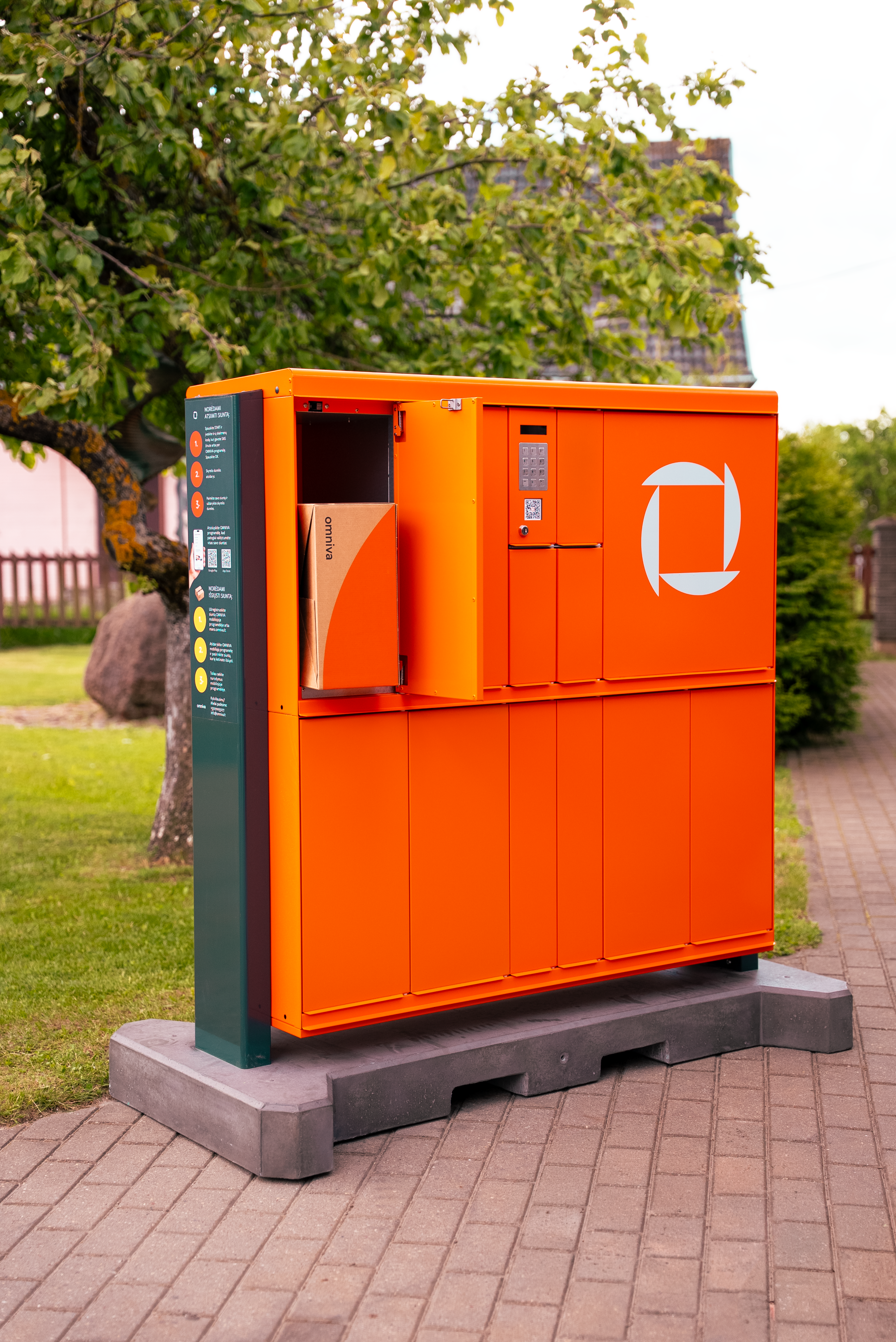
Omniva new generation parcel locker

The company has also developed Picapac, a personal parcel locker installed at customers' homes for receiving, sending and returning parcels. The system is compatible with multiple delivery providers and forms part of Omniva's last-mile delivery infrastructure.

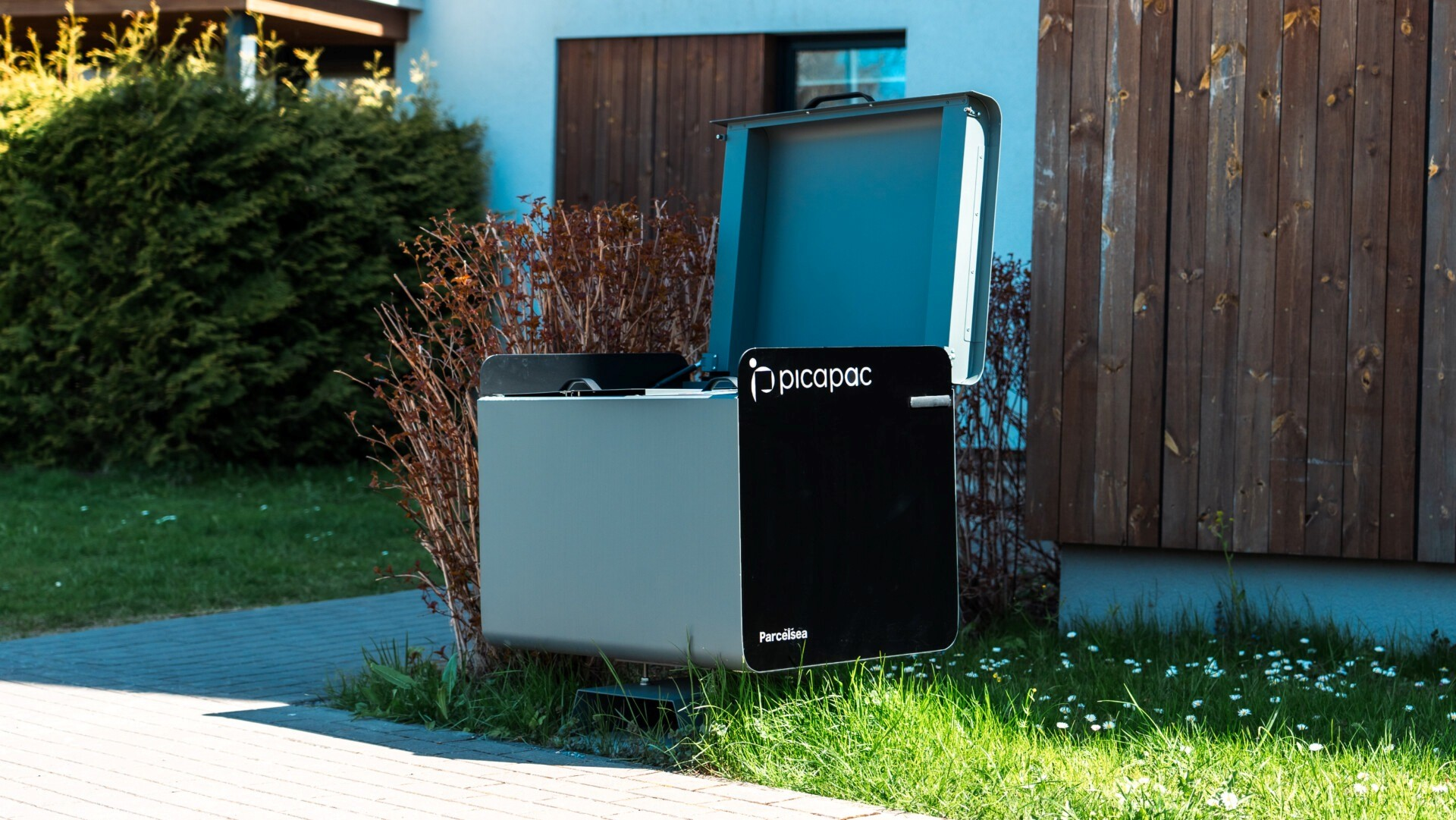
Omniva Picapac parcel locker

Omniva has developed digital platforms that enable customers to manage shipments, track parcels in real time and receive automated delivery notifications. Its logistics operations incorporate automated sorting systems and data-driven route optimisation to improve operational efficiency. The company has also expanded the use of automated parcel lockers as a core component of its self-service logistics network. In addition, Omniva has explored the use of technologies such as artificial intelligence-based route planning and dynamic pricing models to improve logistics operations.

== Postal services ==
Omniva is the provider of Estonia's universal postal service.

According to the 2024 annual report, revenue in 2024 totaled €141.4 million, up from €131.7 million in 2023, while net loss improved from €1.3 million in 2023 to €0.56 million in 2024.

== Sustainability ==
Omniva has adopted environmental targets that include reducing greenhouse gas emissions by 50% by 2030, sourcing 75% of the energy used in its own facilities from renewable sources by 2030, and using only reusable, recyclable or compostable packaging for all packaging sold from 2026 onwards.

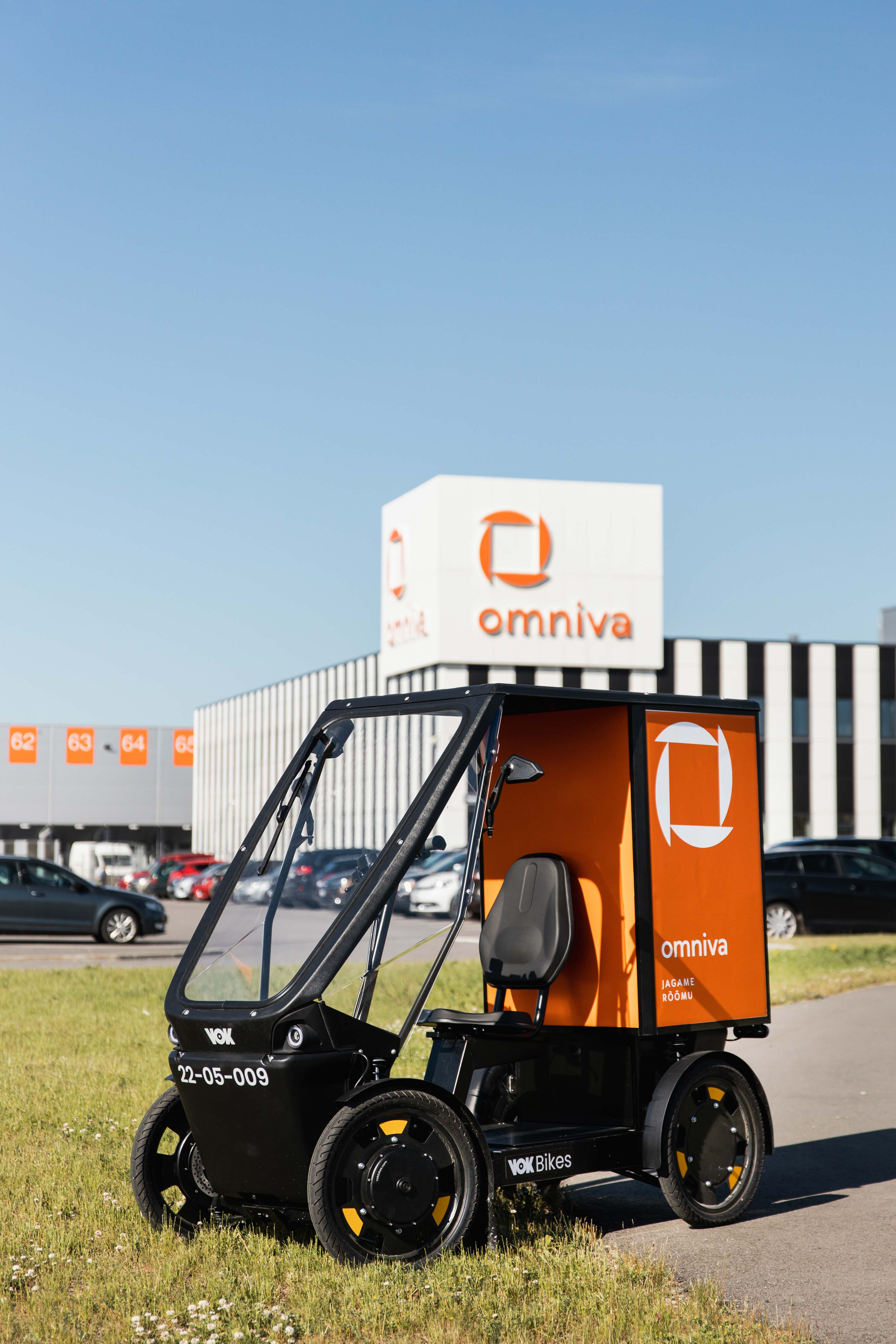
Omniva electric cargo bike

As part of these efforts, the company has invested in renewable energy generation at its logistics facilities, including a solar power plant at its Kaunas logistics centre, and has begun introducing electric delivery vans into its fleet. According to the company's 2025 Sustainability Report, renewable energy accounted for 48% of the group's energy consumption, while its Kaunas and Pallasti sorting centers operated using 100% renewable electricity.

== Awards and recognition ==
In 2025, Omniva won the Postal Evolution category at the World Post & Parcel Awards.

Also in 2025, the company was named Service Provider of the Year at the Parcel and Postal Technology International Awards.

In 2026, Omniva was named Postal Operator of the Year at the World Post & Parcel Awards, recognising the company's transformation from a traditional postal operator into a technology-driven logistics platform.

== See also ==
- Eesti Post
- Postal service in Estonia
- PostEurop
