= Museum of Stamps and Coins =

Coordinates: 43°43′51″N 7°25′4″E

- Musée des timbres et des monnaies de Monaco
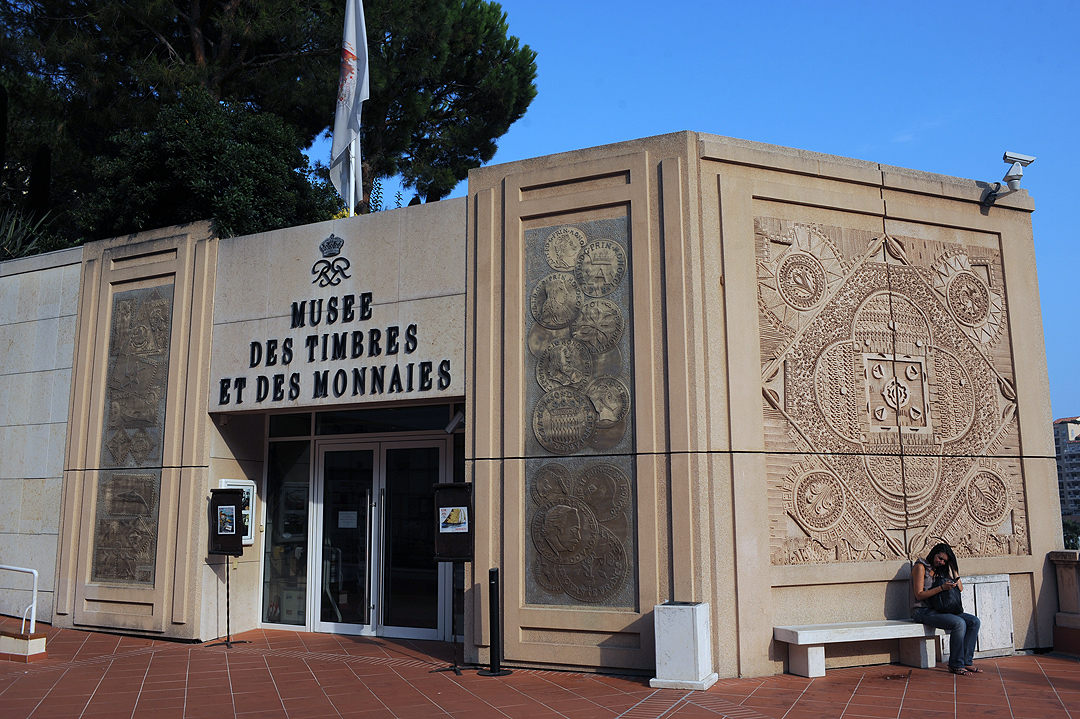
- Entrance to the museum
- Established: 1950; 76 years ago
- Location: Fontvieille, Monaco
- Type: Numismatic museum, philatelic museum
- Website: www.mtm-monaco.mc

The Museum of Stamps and Coins is located in the Fontvieille section of Monaco. It tells the postal history of the principality, and contains a display of Monegasque money dating to 1640.

== History ==
The museum was established by Sovereign Ordinance of Prince Rainier III in 1995, and was opened to the public in January 1996. The museum is home to the Prince's personal stamp and coin collection.

The museum is divided into two halls - the first being the Rare Stamps Room. The first stamps issued in Monaco, those issued in 1885 by Charles III, are held in this space. Prior to this, Sardinian and French stamps were used in Monaco. There are also displays of documents used in the stamp printing process. In addition, there are displays of the machinery used to make stamps and coins, including a stamp printing press and 19th century monetary pendulum.

The second room holds a complete collection of coins, from across Monaco's history. The first Monagesque coins were issued in January 1640 by Prince Honoré II. Today Monaco issues its own Euro coins. Also present are plaster casts used to mint the coins.

An elite philatelic club, the Club de Monte-Carlo, was established in 1999 and is headquartered at the museum. The club showcases rare material at the museum on a bi-annual basis, in the MONACOPHIL exhibition. The museum hosts temporary numismatic exhibitions across Europe.

The museum also hosts a shop which sells stamps, coins and other commemorative items.

== See also ==
- List of museums in Monaco
- Postage stamps and postal history of Monaco
