= Guernsey Post =

Postal service for Guernsey, Channel Islands

Guernsey Post logo

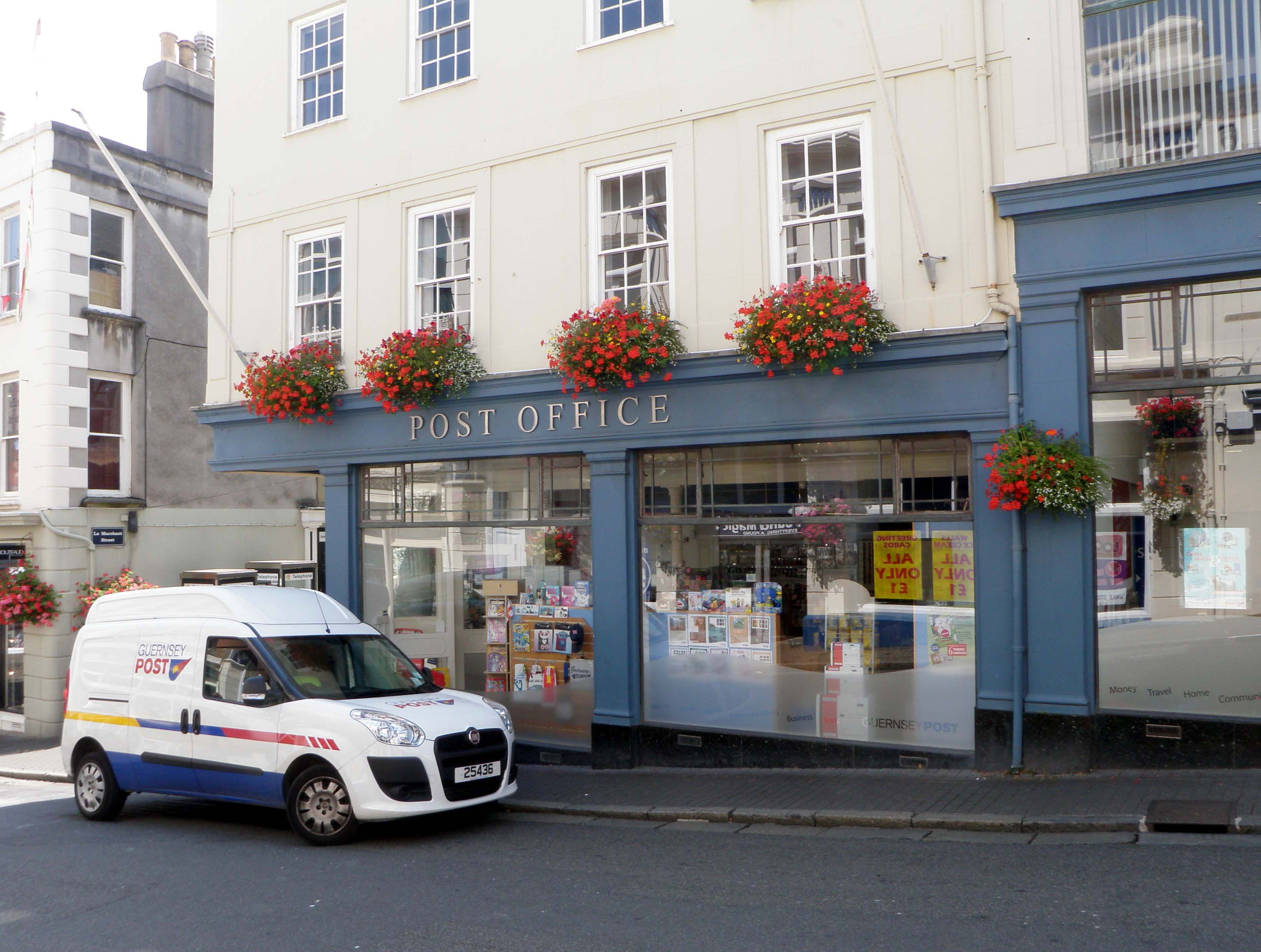
The Smith Street Post Office of the Guersey Post in Saint Peter Port, with a Fiat Doblò Maxi XL postal van parked in front

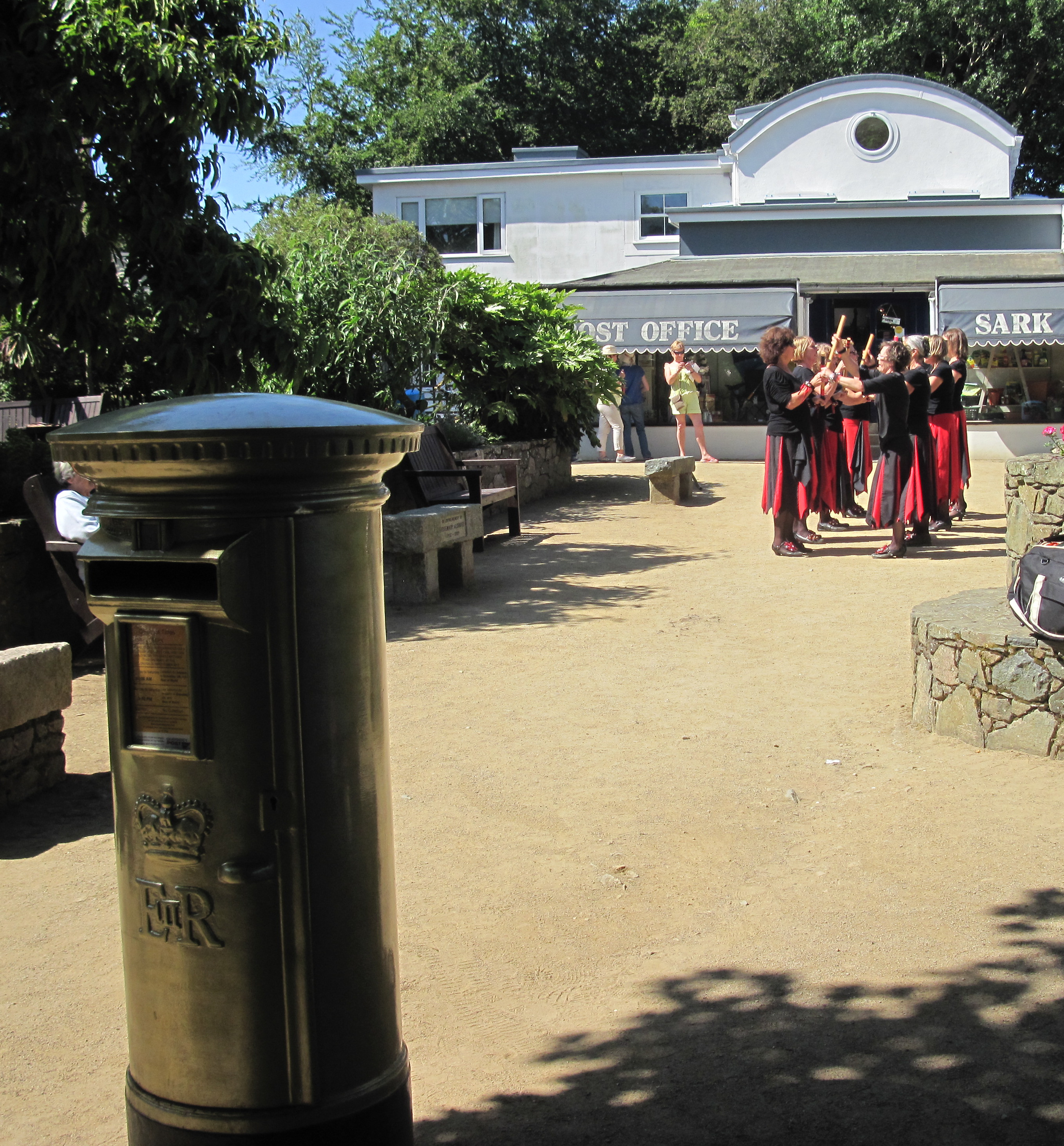
Post office and pillar box on Sark

Guernsey Post is the postal service for the island of Guernsey, Channel Islands. It includes a Philatelic bureau, and regularly issues both definitive and commemorative stamps. It also provides postal services for Alderney and Sark.

In contrast to the United Kingdom, Guernsey Post pillar boxes can be identified by their distinctive blue colour.

== History ==
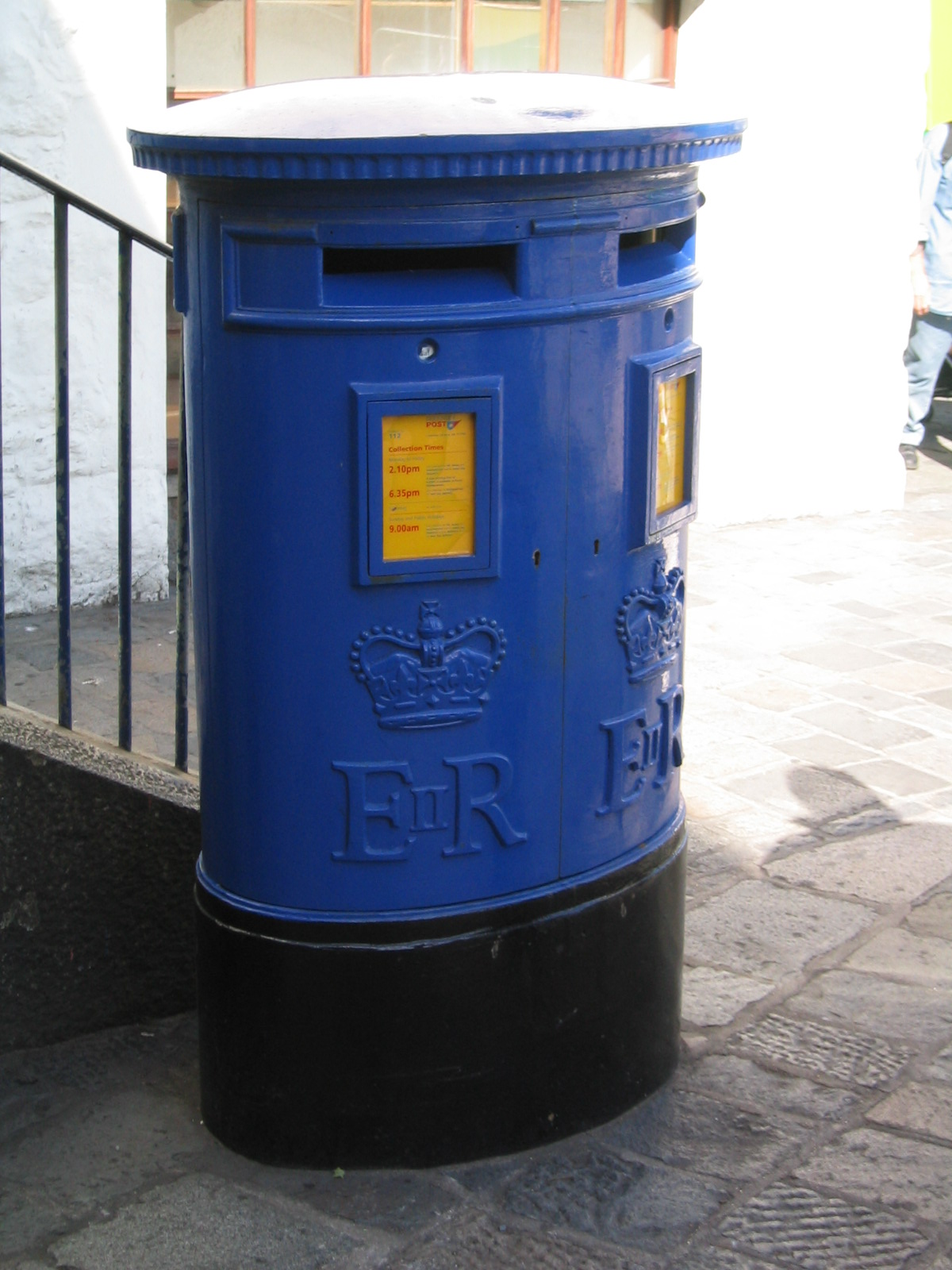
A Guernsey Post pillar box

The first pillar boxes in Britain were introduced in the Channel Islands as an experiment in 1852. Anthony Trollope, the novelist, who was employed by the General Post Office, trialled pillar boxes in the Channel Islands before introducing them into mainland Britain. He was influenced by roadside letter-receiving pillars used in France. Before the use of pillar boxes, on the mainland, individual letters would be taken by hand to a letter receiving house or post office, which was often a coaching inn, a postage stamp purchased and the letter handed to the receiver or postmaster, to connect with the mail coach and later the railway. In the Channel Islands, people took their letters to the mail steamer when it was awaiting the tide in the harbour – the particular problem of an island mail service then. Pillar boxes allowed letters to be posted at any time and they could then be collected when a steamer was due. They were convenient and immediately successful. However, as with many innovations, the first boxes were introduced into Jersey. One of these original pillar boxes can be seen in Union Street, St Peter Port and has been maintained by Guernsey Post in its traditional red livery.

Guernsey stamps were first issued in the island during the German Occupation of 1940–1945, when there was a great shortage of British stamps, as all ties with mainland Britain had been severed by the German authorities.

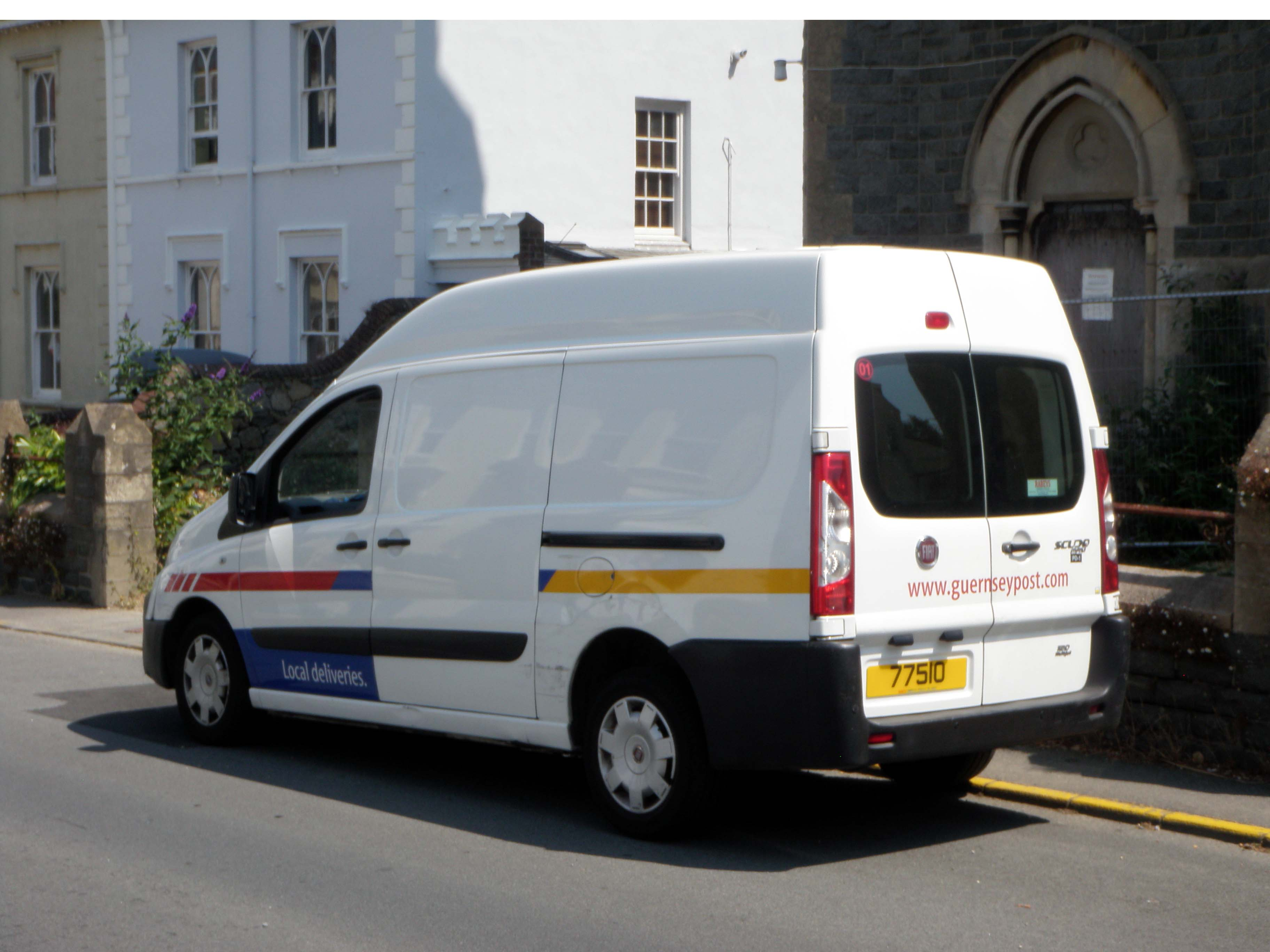
One of Guernsey Post's Fiat Scudo postal vans, in Saint Peter Port

Guernsey's government, the States of Guernsey, took over the running of postal services from the British Government in October 1969 (as did Jersey, forming Jersey Post). Since then on it has regularly issued Guernsey stamps. Guernsey is postcoded as the GY postcode area, established in 1993 as an extension of the United Kingdom postcode system.

In 2001, the States of Guernsey commercialised the Post Office, and it became Guernsey Post Ltd and was awarded the licence to operate the reserved sector postal operation and meet the Universal Service Obligation (USO). To monitor Guernsey Post and either encourage competition in the market or where it is missing provide a controlling force the Office of Utility Regulation, otherwise known as the OUR, was created.

Since 2019, Guernsey Post Ltd has operated a fully-electric home delivery fleet. The same year, the company installed 654 photovoltaic panels to the roof of the company's headquarters to power the building. Surplus energy is supplied back into the island's grid.

Guernsey Post is a member of the Small European Postal Administration Cooperation.

== Postage stamps of Guernsey ==
Guernsey and Alderney Stamps are world-renowned for their beauty and quality. The first Guernsey Postage Stamps were designed and printed during the occupation in 1941 when supplies of British stamps ran out. Over the years many aspects of island life have been commemorated and depicted on Guernsey and Alderney stamps. Topics of past philatelic issues include the sea, the natural world, agriculture and horticulture, transport, sport, Christmas, military, art and entertainment. Guernsey Stamps are produced by Guernsey Post.
