= Club de Monte-Carlo =

The Club de Monte-Carlo de l'Elite de la Philatélie was created in 1999 by sovereign decree of Prince Rainier III of Monaco to unite all of the philatelists who had convened in the Principality to exhibit major philatelic rarities. Membership of the club is restricted to institutions and one hundred prestigious collectors; the club showcases rare material on a bi-annual basis.

The club is headquartered at Monaco's Museum of Stamps and Coins. Rainier had been encouraged to start the club by the philatelist Alexander D. Kroo.

Monacophil stamp exhibition is a non-competitive stampshow being held once every two years at Monte Carlo in early December. Aside from the 100 rarities contributed by its members, there will be a special theme exhibition. Major auction firms and dealers will be present. Please visit official website for details.

The president is Olivier Stocker.
