= Poste Vaticane =

Postal service in Vatican City

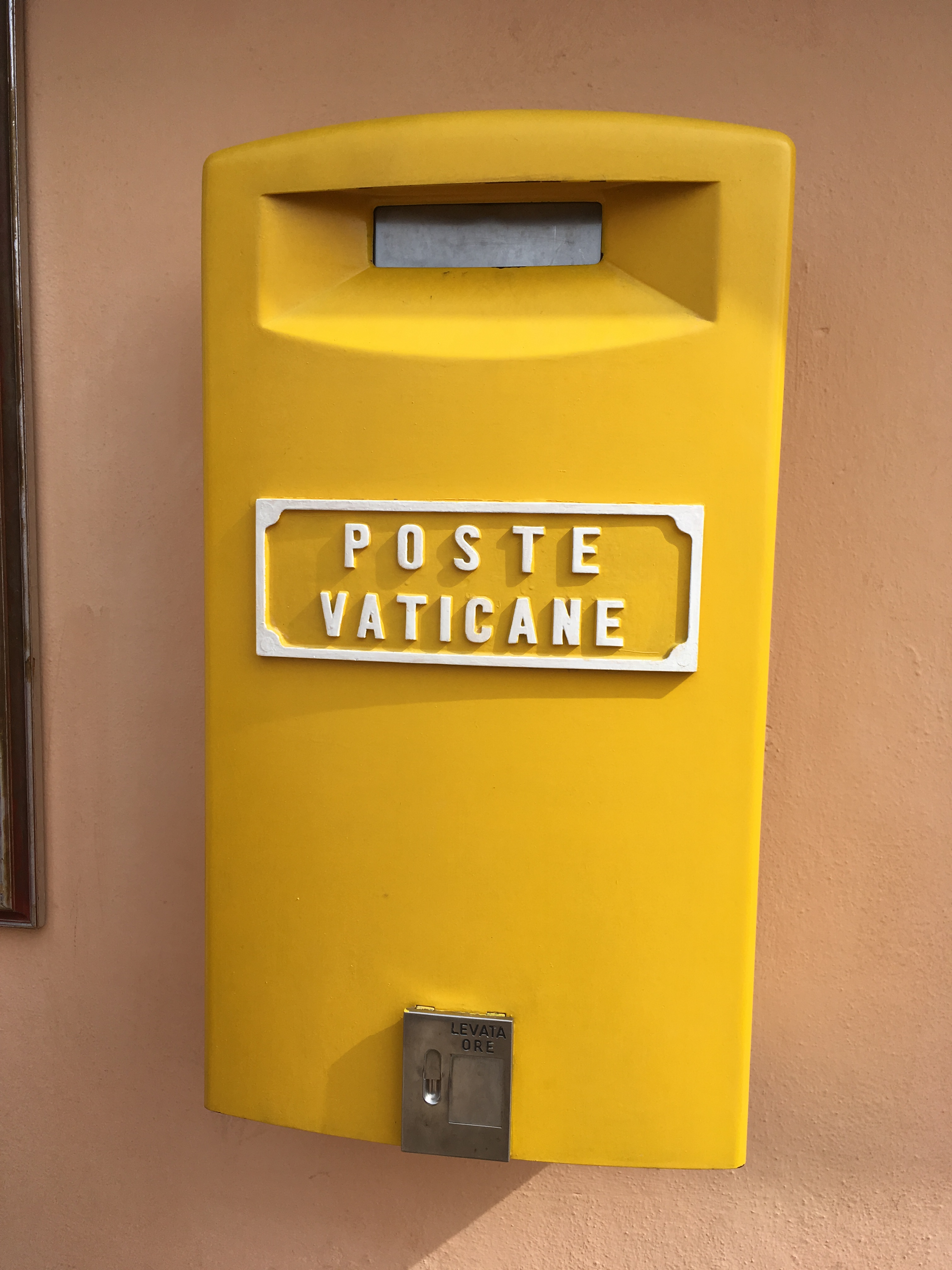
- A mailbox in Vatican City
- Founded: 1929
- Type: Postal service
- Headquarters: Vatican City
- Parent organization: Governorate of Vatican City State

Poste Vaticane is the organization responsible for the postal service in Vatican City. The organization is part of the Post and Telegraphy Service.

== History ==
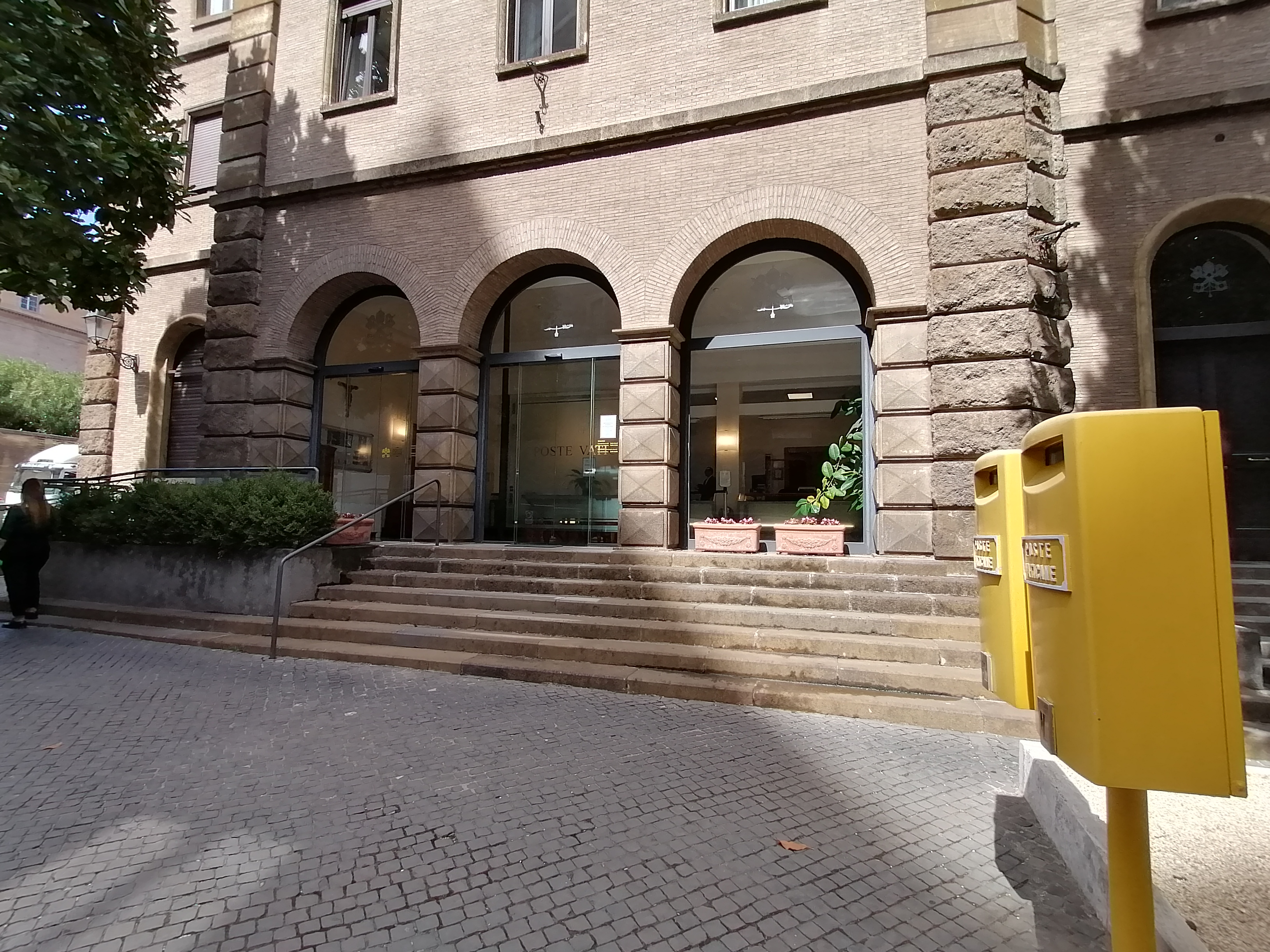
The Central Office of the Vatican Post after the Gate of St. Anna

The use of stamps was introduced in the Vatican in 1852.

Poste Vaticane was created in 1929 following the Lateran Treaty. It started operations on 1 August 1929 (or February 1929), and the Vatican joined the Universal Postal Union on 1 January 1929. Its yellow mail boxes became iconic in the landscape of the papal city. The Poste Vaticane also handled the state's telegraph communications. The air courier system was set up in 1938. The Poste Vaticane joined the European Conference of Postal and Telecommunications Administrations in 1965, and PostEurop in 2012.

In 2020, a law was passed to merge the philatelic and postal activities of the Poste Vaticane. In September 2020, the Poste Vaticane released a stamp picturing the coronavirus.

== Description ==
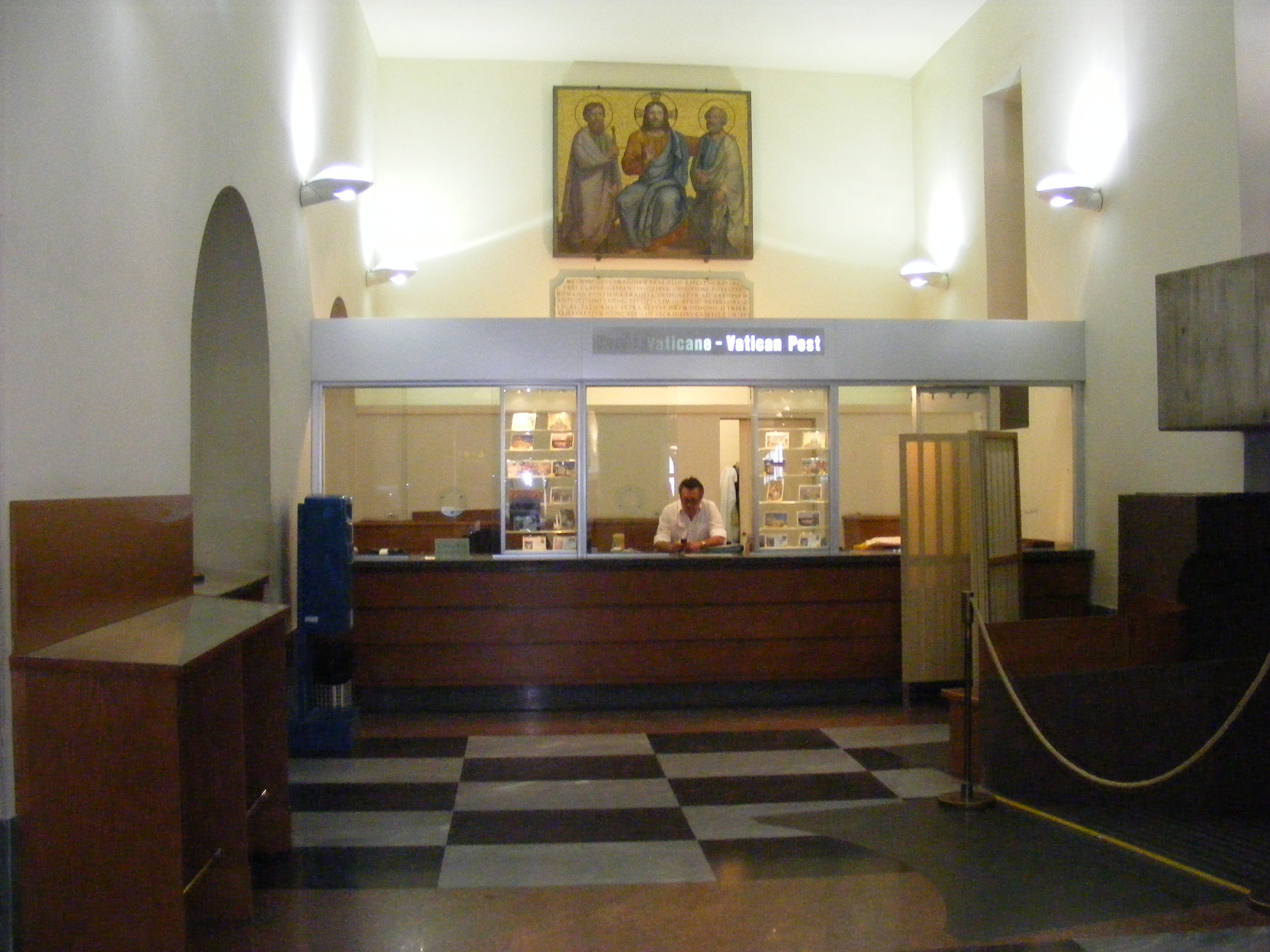
A Post office of the Poste Vaticane in the Vatican Museums

Poste Vaticane manages the Philatelic and Numismatic Office of the Vatican City State and operates four branch offices. The Poste Vaticane handles 140 tonnes of mail and six million postcards every year.

The organization's largest branch is near St. Anne's Gate. Almost all of its mail is carried via air, and only stamps from the Vatican can be used on Vatican mail. In the United States, there is an organization called the Vatican Philatelic Society that collects and studies Poste Vaticane's history, stamps, and covers.

There is a branch of Poste Vaticane within the Vatican Museum.

As of 2018, the organization has suspended services to Sudan, South Sudan, North Korea, Timor Leste, Micronesia, Niue, and the French Southern and Antarctic Lands.

== In popular culture ==
In the 1991 movie Hudson Hawk, Bruce Willis and Andie MacDowell walk through a fictional Vatican secret railway platform branded Poste Vaticane.

== See also ==
- Postage stamps and postal history of Vatican City
- Index of Vatican City-related articles
