= Liechtensteinische Post =

Postal service of Liechtenstein

- Company type: Aktiengesellschaft
- Industry: Postal service
- Founded: 2000
- Headquarters: Schaan, Liechtenstein
- Area served: Liechtenstein
- Key people: Herbert Rüdisser, CEO
- Owner: Government of Liechtenstein
- Website: post.li

Liechtensteinische Post AG (German pronunciation: [ˌlɪçtn̩ʃtaɪnɪʃə ˈpɔst], lit. 'Liechtenstein Post') is the postal service of the Principality of Liechtenstein since 2000.

== History ==
Prior to 1912, the Liechtenstein Postal system was managed by Austria, with the first post office having been set up in the village of Balzers, in operation between 1817 and 1819, and again from 1827 onwards. A second office was opened in Vaduz in 1845, with both offices managed by the Austrian government.

In 1911 the agreement with the Austrian government ended, allowing Liechtenstein control over its own postal system. From 1 February 1912, Liechtenstein was able to issue its own stamps for the first time. However, Austrian stamps were accepted in Liechtenstein until 1921.

The postal service of the principality was managed by Swiss Post from 1 February 1921 until 31 December 1999 upon the signing of a postal treaty signed between the Swiss Confederation and Liechtenstein on 10 November 1920 as part of the customs union between the two states. At the same time, Liechtenstein adopted the Swiss Franc as their official currency.

In 1930, the first Liechtenstein airmail stamps were issued. In the same year, the Postal Museum was founded. However, the permanent collection of the museum did not go on display until 1936. The museum holds in its collection a copy of every stamp made in Liechtenstein since 1912.

Postal codes were issued in Liechtenstein in 1964.

From 1 January 2000, Liechtenstein once again became responsible for its own mail with the founding of Liechtensteinische Post AG. Between 2000 and 2005, and from 2021 onwards, the state of Liechtenstein was the sole shareholder in the company. Between 2005 and 2021, Swiss Post held a 25% stake.
