= Post of North Macedonia =

- Native name: Пошта на Северна Македонија
- Company type: State-owned enterprise
- Founded: 1 June 1992
- Headquarters: Skopje, North Macedonia
- Website: www.posta.com.mk

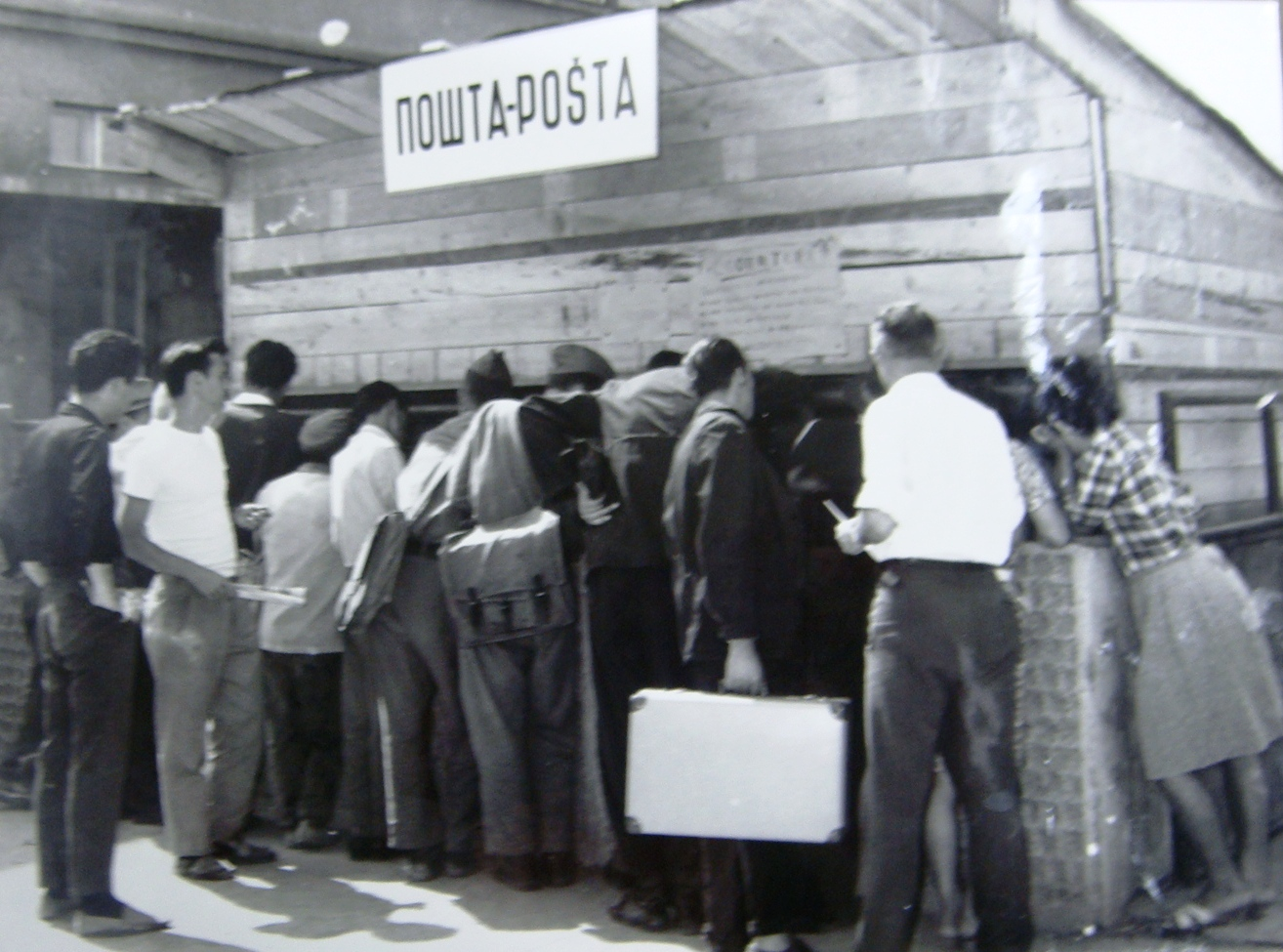
Improvised post office after the 1963 Skopje earthquake.

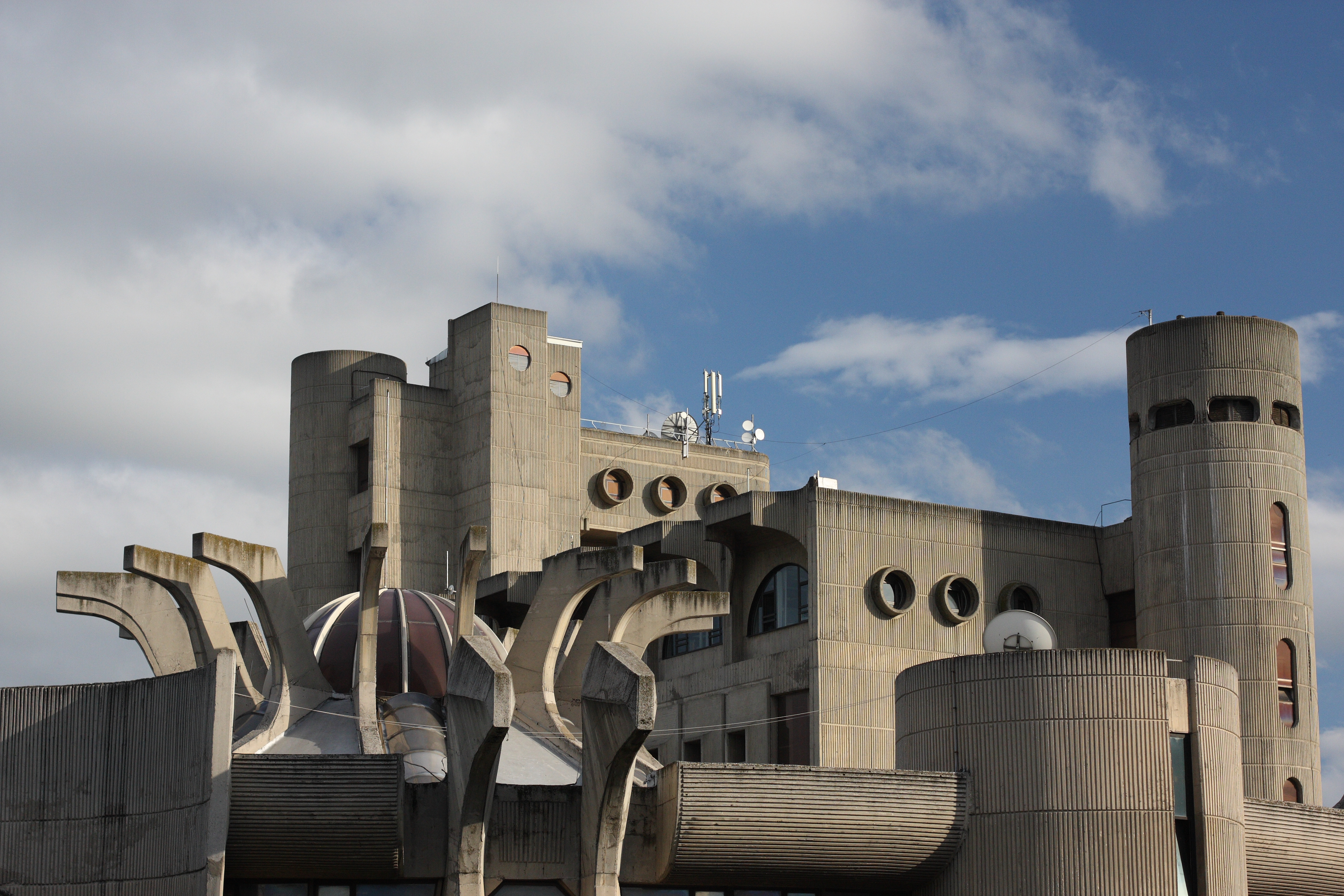
Main Post Office, Skopje

Post of North Macedonia (Macedonian: Пошта на Северна Македонија, romanized: Pošta na Severna Makedonija, Albanian: Posta e Maqedonisë së Veriut), until 2019 Makedonska Pošta (Macedonian: Македонска пошта) is the company responsible for postal service in North Macedonia. It was founded on 1 June 1992.

In 2021, the government of North Macedonia announced that it intends to privatize the company by either selling it or by creating a private-public partnership.

Scams using the company's name have appeared on Facebook.

== Stamps ==
Post of North Macedonia sells commemorative stamps. On 8 March 2025, the company, in collaboration with the UN Women Office in North Macedonia, released a stamp honoring International Woman's Day and the 30th anniversary of the Beijing Declaration and Platform for Action. On 8 May 2020, the company released a stamp to commemorate Croatia's Presidency of the Council of the European Union; this stamp caused controversy, including official complaints from the foreign affairs ministries of Serbia and Bosnia and Herzegovina, due to it featuring a map of the World War II-era Independent State of Croatia rather than modern Croatia. The company apologized and pulled the stamp from circulation the next day.

== Headquarters ==
The headquarters of the Post of North Macedonia is the Main Post Office in Skopje, a notable example of Brutalist architecture, which was designed by Janko Konstantinov after the 1963 Skopje earthquake. Parts of the building were damaged by a fire in 2013; these areas are no longer in use as of 2023. The Ministry of Culture of North Macedonia designated the office as protected cultural heritage in November 2022.

== See also ==
- Postal codes in North Macedonia
