= Jersey Post =

Mail service company in Jersey

Jersey Post International Limited
- Company type: Limited Liability Company
- Industry: Mail
- Predecessor: Committee for Postal Administration
- Founded: 1 July 2006
- Headquarters: Postal Headquarters; La Rue Grellier; Rue des Pres Trading Estate, Parish of St Saviour, Jersey
- Key people: Kevin Keen OBE (Chairman); Mark Siviter (Chief Executive)
- Parent: Government of Jersey Investments Limited (100%)
- Website: jerseypost.com

Jersey Post is the licensed universal service provider of mail service for the Bailiwick of Jersey.

== History ==
Jersey Post was established (as the Committee for Postal Administration) by the Post Office (Jersey) Law 1969, in 1969 as a result of an Order in Council which enabled the Crown Dependencies to establish independent postal services.

Jersey is postcoded as the JE postcode area, established between 1990 and 1994 as an extension of the United Kingdom postcode system. Previously, Jersey did not have postcodes (despite an unsuccessful experiment using delivery round numbers).

Jersey Post International Limited was incorporated as a Limited Liability Company by the States Assembly on 1 July 2006 when the Postal Services (Jersey) Law 2005 came fully into force allowing competition in this sector for the first time. It is licensed by the Jersey Competition Regulatory Authority as a Class II postal operator and, as such, is designated to hold significant market power and thus is liable for the universal service on the Island. Jersey Post International Limited is wholly owned by the Government of Jersey through Government of Jersey Investments Limited.

== Jersey stamps ==
In 1969, with the establishment of Jersey Post, UK postage stamps ceased to be valid in the Crown Dependencies. The Bailiwicks had previously produced stamps and operated independent postal systems during the 1940–1945 German occupation of the Channel Islands.

Jersey Post has a philatelic department which researches, designs, produces and markets Jersey postage stamps which are then sold to stamp collectors worldwide. Jersey Post is member of the Small European Postal Administration Cooperation (SEPAC), which is an organisation that represents small post offices in Europe and the United Kingdom in connection with both philatelic and postal matters.

== Postal and other services ==
Jersey Post has entered several other markets. These include Promail, its mailing house set up in 1996, and Offshore Solutions, its fulfilment service. Promail provides a bulk mail service for the offshore financial community.

In 2006, Jersey Post added a new premium service (FedEx Express) which Jersey Post calls J-express.

In December 2009, Jersey Post launched Jersey's first virtual telephone network, a pay as you go mobile telephone service called Me:Mo. In 2011, this telecoms service was terminated, and customer accounts were transferred to Airtel-Vodafone.

In 2016, Jersey Post Group acquired UK based European logistics company, Fraser Freight, now known as Woodside Logistics, this acquisition formed the basis for global logistics company JPGL.
