= Europa postage stamp =

Annual joint issue of stamps

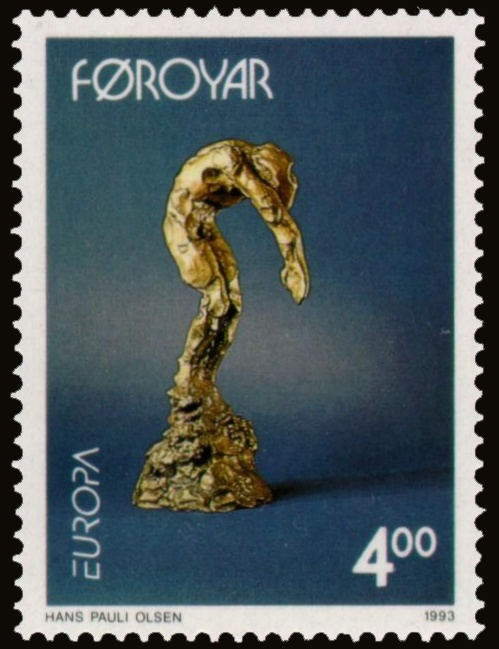
Faeroese Europa stamp of 1993, part of the contemporary art common theme, with the current EUROPA logo in the lower left corner

The Europa postage stamp (also known as Europa – CEPT until 1992) is an annual joint issue of stamps with a common design or theme by postal administrations of member countries of the European Communities (1956–1959), the European Conference of Postal and Telecommunications Administrations (CEPT) from 1960 to 1992, and the PostEurop Association since 1993. Europe is the central theme.

== History ==
=== From 1956 to 1993 ===
The first Europa issue was on 15 September 1956. The postal administrations of the founding six members of the European Coal and Steel Community (ECSC) issued stamps with a common design: a tower made up of the letters of the word "EUROPA" and surrounded by construction scaffolding.

In 1959, the European Conference of Postal and Telecommunications Administrations (CEPT) was formed, and from 1960 the initials "CEPT" were displayed on the joint issue stamps. The stamps had a common design from 1956 to 1973, (with the exception of 1957). However, many countries issued a stamp that did not feature the common pattern but just displayed the word "EUROPA". From 1974, the common design was replaced by stamps with different designs, but with a common theme.

The success of Europa issues among collectors prompted many postal administrations of small countries or territories dependent of European countries (the Channel Islands for instance) to join the issuing countries in the 70s. Andorra has issued Europa Stamps since 1966 (French) and 1972 (Spain). Andorra cannot Join PostEurop as its Postal System is looked after independently by both France and Spain. The Isle of Man and Guernsey, Crown dependencies of the United Kingdom, first issued Europa stamps in 1976, with Jersey following in 1978. The number of participants reached 35 in the 80s. Turkey participated continuously since 1960, and Yugoslavia from 1969. The collapse of the communist bloc in 1989–90 brought new issuers, reaching 57 countries in the late 90s.

=== Since 1993 ===
When CEPT decided to focus more on telecommunications in 1993, PostEurop took over the management of the Europa issues. The CEPT logo was replaced by a new logo created by PostEurop, i.e. the word "EUROPA" leaning to the right.

Although in 2006 the member countries of PostEurop chose the theme of "Integration as seen by young people" instead of a theme related to the 50th anniversary of Europa issues, several countries issued stamps showing the first common designs of the years 1950–1970. An anniversary logo (the number 50 in the middle of a star with 5 branches) is also featured on these stamps. Several non-European countries and non-PostEurop Members have issued stamps in connection with this anniversary. In Europe, some countries, including Serbia, Montenegro, Albania, Armenia, Moldova, Gibraltar, Cyprus, etc. also participated in these issues.

In order to promote Europa issues among philatelists, PostEurop created in 2002 an annual competition of the “Best Europa stamp”. Until 2006, only representatives of the various postal administrations were entitled to elect the best Europa stamp during the Plenary Assembly of PostEurop, but since 2007, the winner is elected through an open and public voting procedure on the PostEurop website.

From January 2011, the new EUROPA logo, preceded by a symbolic reminder of the mailbox, applies, and a Jury Prize Competition is designed by seven philatelic experts.

== Common designs ==
1960: Common design

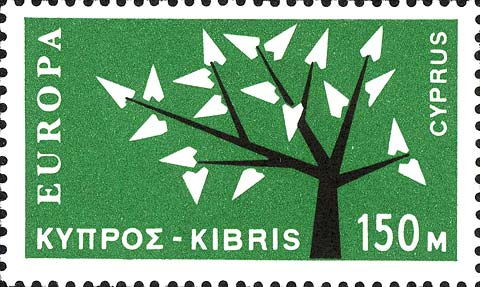
1962: A stylised tree with 19 leaves, one for each 1962 member of CEPT. Designer was Lex Weyer from Luxembourg.

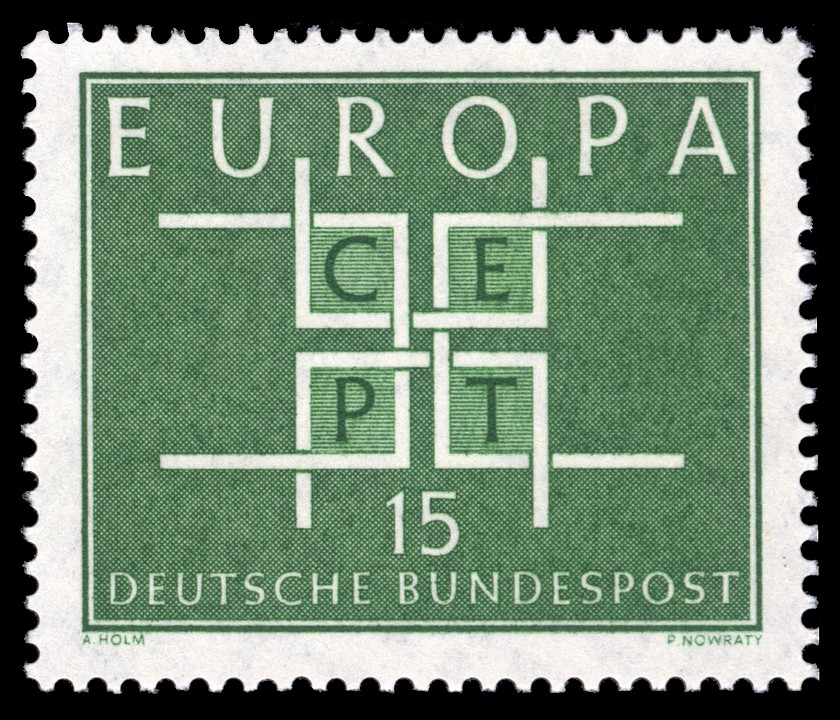
1963: A stylised cross design composed of 4 3-sided U shapes with CEPT inlaid. Designed by Arne E. Holm of Norway.

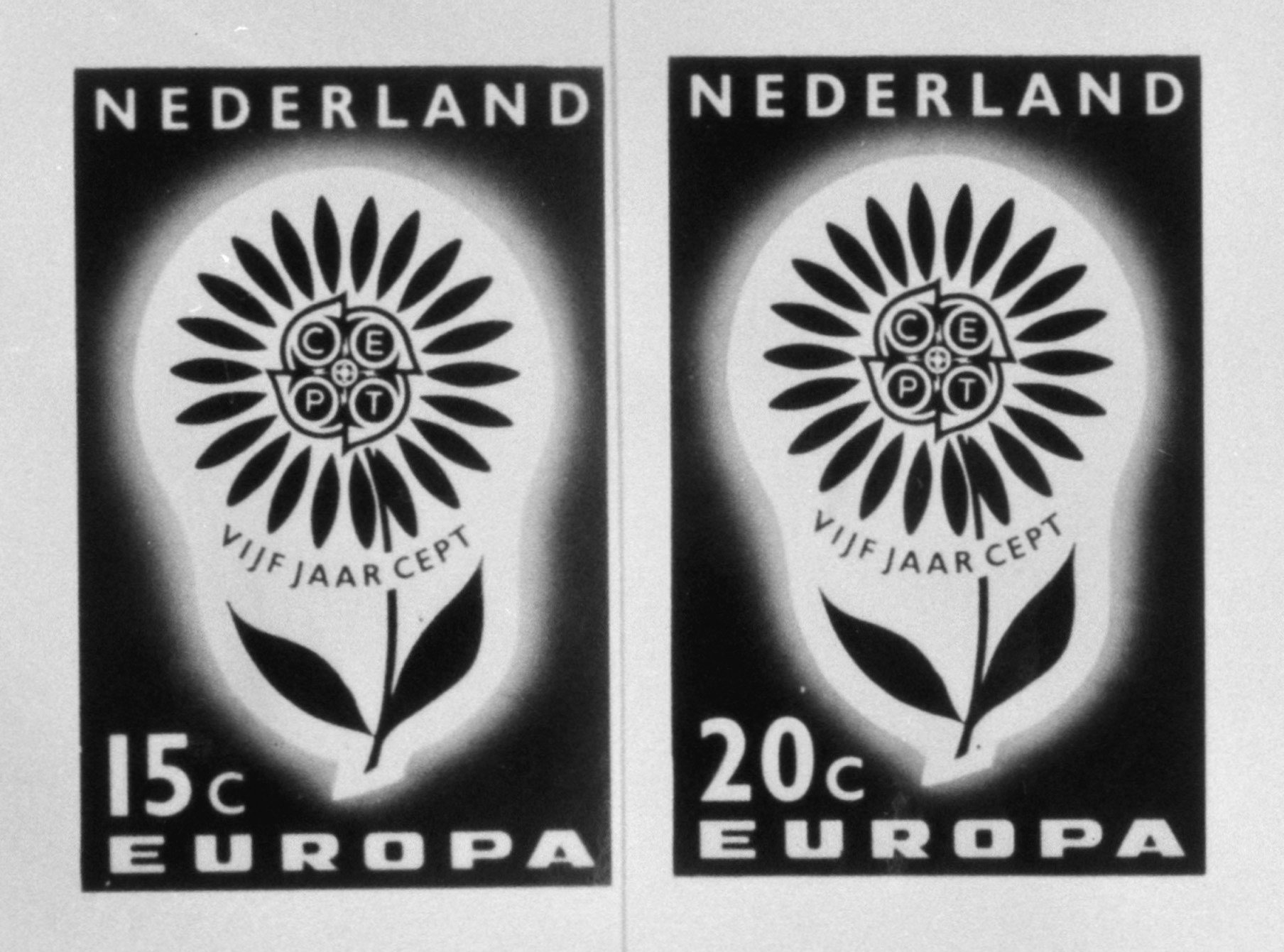
1964: Flower with 22 petals. 1 petal for each 1964 member. Designed by Georges Betemps of France.

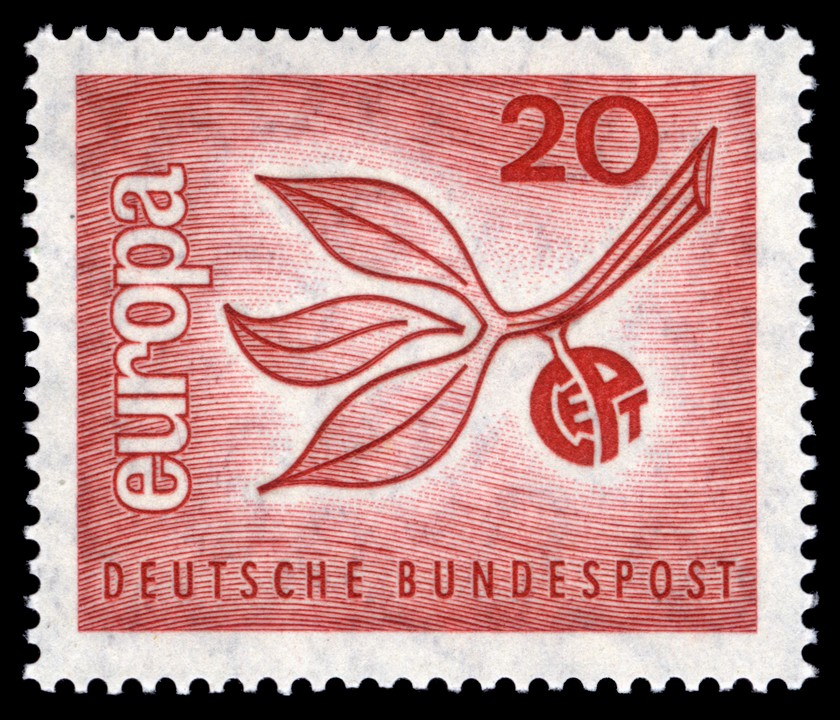
1965: Tree sprig. Three leaves said to represent posts, telegraphs and telephones. Designed by Hoerder Karlsson from Iceland.

1966: Common design

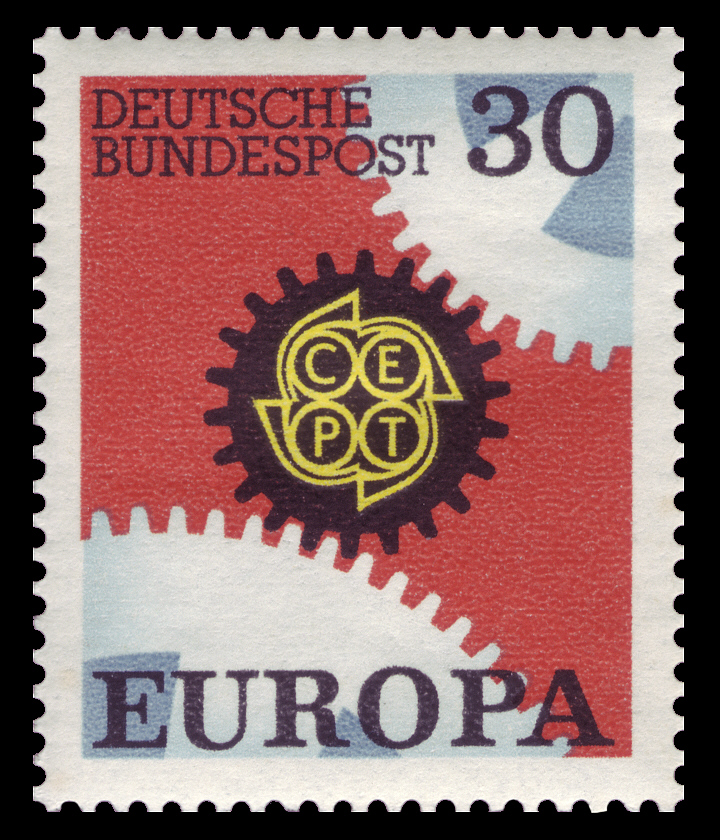
1967: Cogwheels. CEPT Wheel has 22 teeth, one tooth for each 1967 members of CEPT. Designer was Oscar Bonnevalle of Belgium.

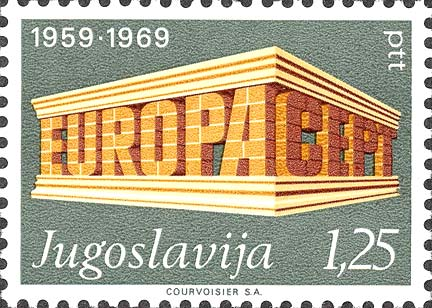
1969: EUROPA & CEPT inset on 2 sides of an architectural type colonnade. Designed by Italians Luigi Gasbara & Giorgio Belli.

1970: Common design

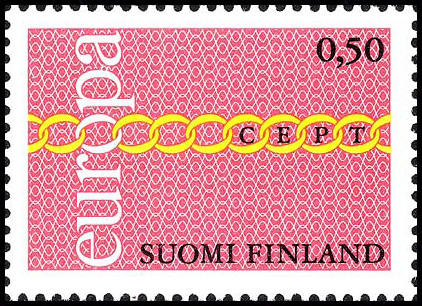
1971: Chain of O with CEPT in the links. Designer was Helgi Haflidason of Iceland.

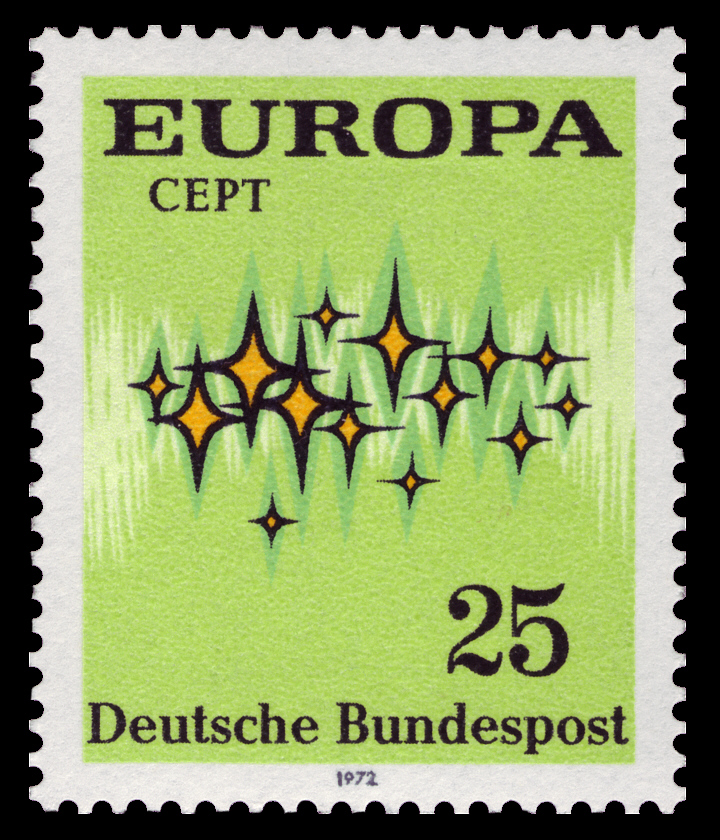
1972: Aurora borealis designed by Finnish artist Paavo Huovinen.

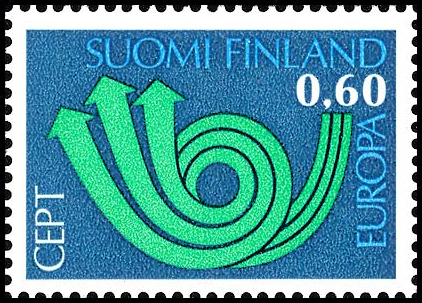
1973: Stylised post horn. Design of 3 Arrows represent posts, telegraphs & telephones. Designer was Leif Frimann Anisdahl of Norway.

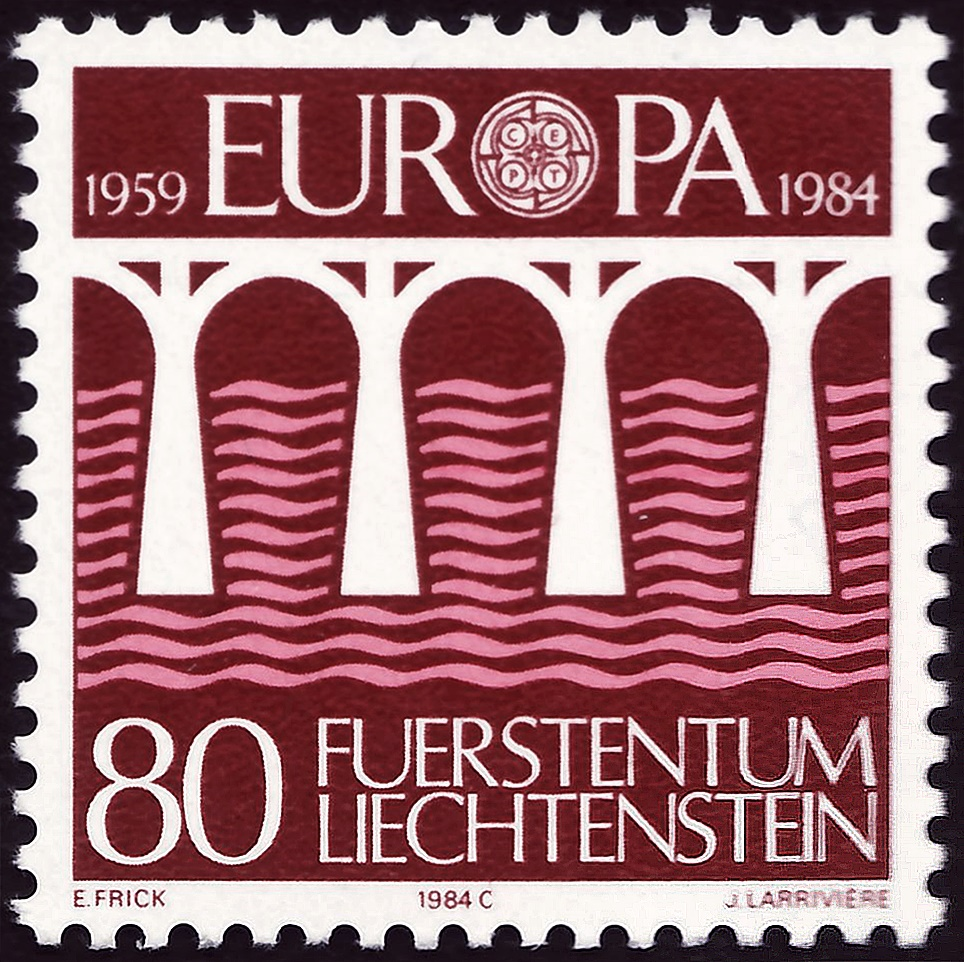
1984: Bridge designed by the French engraver Jacky Larrivière. 25th Anniversary of CEPT.

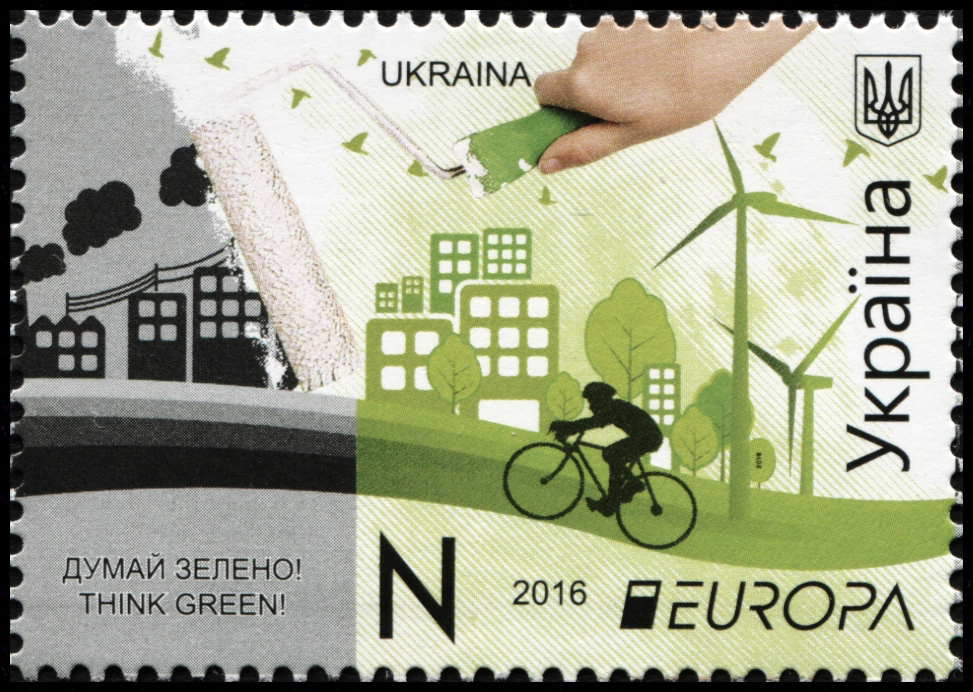
2016: "Think Green" design by Doxia Sergidou of Cyprus

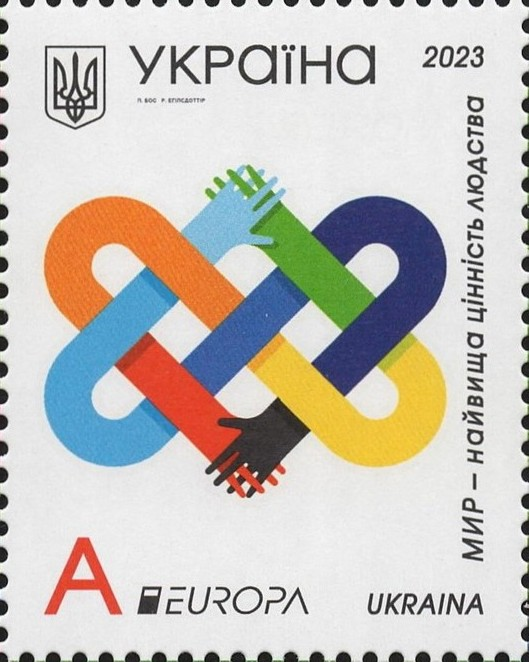
2023: “The New Peace Symbol”. Designers Linda Bos and Runa Egilsdottir from A DESIGNERS' COLLECTIVE.

2026: “70th anniversary of EUROPA stamp”. Designers Klaus Welp and Tommi Kantola of Finland.

== Common theme issues ==
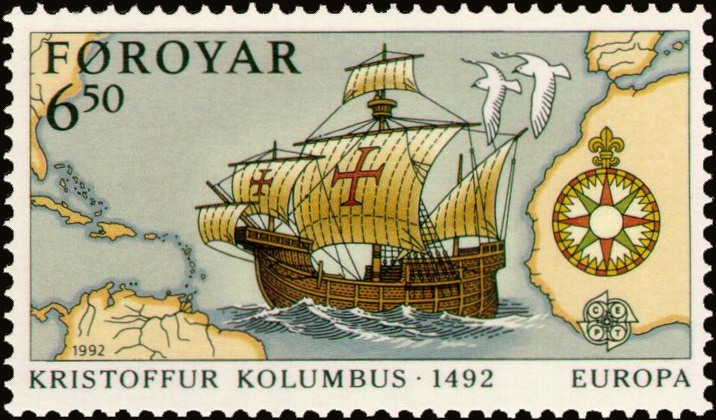
Faroese 1992 stamp, part of the Discovery of America common theme

The list includes the jury and online competition winners since 2002 when the EUROPA stamp competition started.

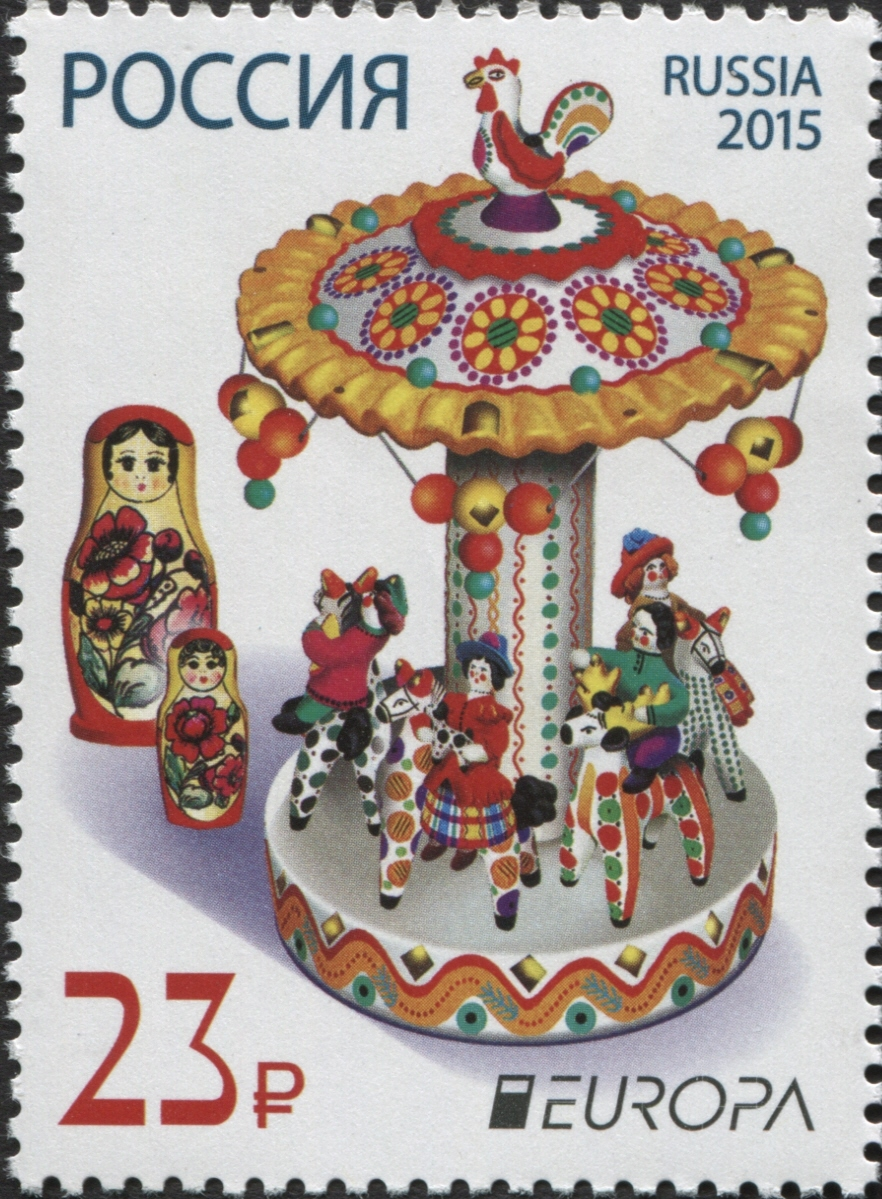
2015 competition-winning Russian stamp, with the current EUROPA logo

Year	Number of countries	New countries (post administrations)	Number of different stamps	Topic	Competition winners	ref
1956	6	Belgium, France, Germany, Italy, Luxembourg, Netherlands	13	common design	—	
1957	8	Switzerland, Saarland	17	Peace and Welfare through Agriculture and Industry	—	
1958	8	Turkey	17	common design	—	
1959	8	Austria	15	common design	—	
1960	20	Denmark, Finland, Great Britain, Greece, Iceland, Ireland, Liechtenstein, Norway, Portugal, Spain, Sweden	36	common design	—	
1961	19	Cyprus, San Marino	34	common design	—	
1962		Monaco		common design	—	
1963		—		common design	—	
1964	19	—	36	common design	—	
1965	19	—	36	common design	—	
1966	19	Andorra (French post)	37	common design	—	
1967	19	—	37	common design	—	
1968	18	—	35	common design	—	
1969	26	Vatican, Yugoslavia	48	common design	—	
1970	19	—	42	common design	—	
1971	21	Malta	44	common design	—	
1972	22	Andorra (Spanish post)	46	common design	—	
1973	24	—	50	common design	—	
1974	23	—	49	Sculptures	—	
1975	24	Northern Cyprus (unofficially)	50	Paintings	—	
1976	27	Guernsey, Isle of Man	58	Handicrafts	—	
1977	28	—	56	Landscapes	—	
1978	30	Jersey	65	Monuments	—	
1979	31	Faroe islands, Gibraltar	68	Postal history	—	
1980	32	—	67	Famous People	—	
1981	35	Azores, Madeira	69	Folklore and feasts	—	
1982	35	—	70	Historic events	—	
1983	35	—	71	Inventions	—	
1984	35	—	67	common design (25th Anniversary of CEPT)	—	
1985	35	—	73	European Music Year	—	
1986	35	—	74	Nature conservation	—	
1987	35	—	74	Modern architecture	—	
1988	35	—	79	Transportation and communications	—	
1989	35	—	80	Children's games	—	
1990	37	—	78	Post office buildings	—	
1991	41	Bulgaria, Czechoslovakia, Hungary, Poland, Romania	83	European aerospace	—	
1992	42	Albania, Croatia	90	500 years of the European discovery of America	—	
1993	45	Lithuania, Moldova, Slovenia, Slovakia, Czech Republic, Belarus (unofficially), Croat post of Bosnia and Herzegovina (unofficially)	92	Contemporary art	—	
1994	48	Åland, Greenland, Estonia, Latvia	85	Great discoveries	—	
1995	48	Russia, Bosnia and Herzegovina	90	Peace and freedom	—	
1996	52	Macedonia	89	Famous European women	—	
1997	54	Armenia, Ukraine, Serb post of Bosnia and Herzegovina (unofficially)	96	Tales and legends	—	
1998	56	Azerbaijan, Georgia, Belarus	94	Festivals and national celebrations	—	
1999	56	—	100	Nature reserves and parks	—	
2000	55	—	68	Common design: Tower of 6 Stars (not all followed the common design)	—	
2001	56	—	92	Water, a treasure of nature	—	
2002	58	—	93	The circus	(Malta) MaltaPost	
2003	57	Yugoslavia becomes Serbia-Montenegro	96	Poster art	La Poste Monaco	
2004	57	—	96	Holidays	Post Greenland	
2005	60	Croat post of Bosnia and Herzegovina, Serb post of Bosnia and Herzegovina, Kazakhstan, Montenegro	103	Gastronomy	(Iceland) Íslandspóstur	
2006	60	UNMIK Kosovo	105	Integration as seen by young people	(Ukraine) Ukrposhta	
2007	62	—	111	100 Years of Scoutism	(Armenia) HayPost (jury)	
2008	63	Nagorno Karabakh	107	Writing letters	(Hungary) Magyar Posta	
2009	63	—	112	Astronomy (International Year of Astronomy)	(Hungary) Magyar Posta	
2010				Children Books	(Hungary) Magyar Posta	
2011				Forest (International Year of Forests)	Cyprus Post (jury)	
2011				Forest (International Year of Forests)	(Turkey) Turkish PTT (online)	
2012				Visit... (for instance "Visit Russia", "Visit Hungary" etc.)	(Russia) Russian Post (jury)	
2012				Visit... (for instance "Visit Russia", "Visit Hungary" etc.)	(Hungary) Magyar Posta (online)	
2013				Postal vehicles (celebrating PostEurop's 20th anniversary)	(Finland) Itella Posti (jury)	
2013				Postal vehicles (celebrating PostEurop's 20th anniversary)	(Turkey) Turkish PTT (online)	
2014				National music instruments	(Belgium) bpost (jury)	
2014				National music instruments	(Serbia) Pošta Srbije (online)	
2015				Old toys	(Russia) Russian Post (jury)	
2015				Old toys	(Turkey) Turkish PTT (online)	
2016				Common design: Ecology in Europe – "Think Green"	Cyprus Post	
2017				Castles	(Finland) Posti Group (jury)	
2017				Castles	(Turkey) Turkish PTT (online)	
2018				Bridges	(Belgium) bpost (jury)	
2018				Bridges	(Turkey) Turkish PTT (online)	
2019				Birds	(Slovenia) Pošta Slovenije (jury)	
2019				Birds	(Armenia) HayPost (online)	
2020				Ancient postal routes	(Poland) Polish Post (jury)	
2020				Ancient postal routes	(Turkey) Turkish PTT (online)	
2021				Endangered wildlife	(Poland) Polish Post	
2022				Stories and myths	POST Luxembourg	
2023				Common design: PEACE – The highest value of humanity	POST Luxembourg	
2024				Underwater fauna and flora	(France) La Poste	
2025				Archaeological discoveries	(Norway) Posten Bring	
2026				Common design: 70th anniversary of EUROPA stamp	(Finland) Posti Group	
2027				Street art	TBD	

== Sources ==
- AskPhil – Glossary of Stamp Collecting Terms
- Encyclopaedia of Postal History
