= Worldwide use of telegrams by country =

List of telegram services by country

This is a list of telegram services by country.

== Active service ==
Country	Comments
Algeria	Algérie Poste offers telegram services under the name Barki@tic.
Argentina	Correo Argentino still offers telegram service within Argentina and to international destinations.
Aruba	Post Aruba still offers telegram service.
Austria	telegramm.at offers telegram service.
Azerbaijan	Telegrams can be sent at offices of Azərpoçt.
Bahrain	Batelco still offers telegram service. Telegrams are sent for deaths or important occasions as they are thought to be more formal than email or fax, but less so than a letter.
Belarus	Beltelecom still offers telegram service. Greetings telegrams are also offered on special cards for congratulations and condolences.
Bosnia and Herzegovina	Hrvatska pošta Mostar, BH Pošta, and Pošte Srpske offer telegram services.
Brazil	Correios still offers telegram service, only within the country. Telegrams can be sent from any post office, by telephone and by the Internet.
Canada	Telegrams Canada still offers telegram service. AT&T Canada (previously CNCP Telecommunications) had discontinued its telegram service in 2001 and later became MTS Allstream.
China	As of 2026, China Unicom still offers public telegram sending from Beijing to Beijing, Guangzhou, Shandong, Hebei and Hefei.
Colombia	As of 2015, 4-72 still offered telegram service.
Costa Rica	Correos de Costa Rica still offers telegram service.
Croatia	Hrvatska pošta still offers telegram service. Telegrams may be sent via the Internet, telephone or fax, and are optionally deliverable by telephone or fax. Illustrated and musical telegrams are available for special occasions. It's often used to send condolences.
Cuba	Correos de Cuba still offers telegram service.
Iran	Telecommunication Infrastructure Company of I.R.Iran still offers telegram service.
Israel	Israel Postal Company still offers telegram service. Telegrams may be sent via the Internet or by a telephone operator. Illustrated telegrams are available for special occasions.
Italy	Poste Italiane still offers telegram service. As of 2010 around 12.5 million telegrams were sent annually, and telegrams are considered the standard way to offer condolences.
Japan	NTT and KDDI still offer domestic telegram service. Telegrams are used mainly for special occasions such as weddings, funerals, graduations, etc. Local offices offer telegrams printed on special decorated paper and envelopes. International service was discontinued on 31 March 2026.
Jordan	Jordan Post Company still offers telegram service.
Kuwait	The Ministry of Communications maintains a local and international telegram service. A form must be filled out, and along with a copy of one's civil ID, must be delivered in person.
Latvia	Latvijas pasts offers telegram service transmitted with a special computer network between post offices.
Mauritius	Mauritius Post maintains a domestic telegram service.
Myanmar	As of 2014, MPT still offers a domestic telegram service.
Mexico	Telmex still offers telegram service as a low-cost service for people who cannot afford or do not have access to e-mail, under the name of 'telegraficos telegrama'.
Monaco	The Monaco Post Office still offers telegram service according the website of the Monaco Public Service.
Montenegro	Pošta Crne Gore still offers telegram service.
Netherlands	KPN sold its telegram service to the Swiss-based company Unitel Telegram Services in 2001.
Panama	Correos Panamá still offers telegram service.
Portugal	CTT Correios de Portugal, S.A. and Altice Portugal still offer telegram services in continental Portugal, the Azores, and Madeira. Normal telegrams are delivered the next day, and urgent telegrams are delivered the same day if handed in before 3pm.
Russia	Central Telegraph (subsidiary of national operator Rostelecom) still offers telegram service. "Regular" or "Urgent" telegrams can be sent to any address in Russia and other countries. So called "Stylish" telegrams printed on artistic postcards are also available.
San Marino	Poste San Marino offers telegram service.
Serbia	JP Pošta Srbije Beograd, the state-owned postal service, still offers telegram service. It is commonly used to express condolences, official notifications of death or to congratulate anniversaries, births, graduations, etc. Telegrams may be sent by using a special telephone number or directly at the post office. Telegrams are delivered on the same day for recipients in territories covered by post offices with telegram delivery service and are delivered as regular mail for post offices which do not have telegram delivery service. In internal traffic, the length of messages is limited to 800 characters and is charged at a flat rate while in international traffic telegrams are charged by the word. International delivery is possible for recipients in Croatia, Slovenia, Montenegro, Bosnia and Herzegovina, and North Macedonia.
Slovenia	Pošta Slovenije d.o.o. (Slovenian Post) still provides telegram service commonly used for special occasions such as births, anniversaries, condolences, graduations, etc. It is considered more formal than email or SMS. Telegrams are usually printed in a typewriter font on greeting or condolences cards delivered in a specific yellow envelope. It is also possible to send gifts (e.g. chocolates, wine, plush toys, flowers) together with a message. The telegrams can be sent from local post offices, over the phone or online to addresses in Slovenia only.
South Africa	Network Telex offer e-telegram service via its chain of E-tel Express storefronts. Telegrams can be sent within South Africa and internationally.
Spain	Correos, the state-owned postal service, provides telegraph service for both domestic and international destinations. SEUR (a DPD company) still offers telegram service.
Turkey	PTT has been providing telegram service in Turkey since 1855.
Uruguay	Antel, the state-owned postal service, provides telegraph service for both domestic and international destinations. Telegrams can be placed online, by phone, or at a post office.
Vatican City	Poste e Filatelia Città del Vaticano provides telegram services to and from the Vatican City State (including the Holy See).

== Former service ==
Country	Year service ended	Comments
United Kingdom	1982	After 1982, British Telecom maintained a telemessage service to replace telegrams. This service was sold to the Swiss-based company Unitel Telegram Services as Telegrams Online in 2003 which has since closed.
Finland	2001	Suomen Posti discontinued its international telegram service in January 2001. One can still send domestic messages that look like old-fashioned telegrams but are delivered as ordinary mail or e-mail.
Ireland	2002	Eircom discontinued telegram service on 30 July 2002.
Sweden	2002	Telia discontinued telegram service in 2002.
New Zealand	2003-2023	New Zealand Post discontinued telegram service in 1999. It later reinstated the service in 2003 for use only by business customers, primarily for debt collection or other important business notices. As of 2023 the post office makes no mention of the service, so sometime between 2003 and 2023 this service was likely discontinued.
Romania	2004	Poșta Română discontinued its telegram service in 2004 replacing it with a e-Post service.
Bulgaria	2005	Vivacom stopped telegram service in 2005, although Bulgarian Posts since 2006 offers "Telemail", which allows the sending of short text messages, graphic documents, and hand-written messages from any post office to a fax or teletype machine on Vivacom's network.
Pakistan	2006	Pakistan Telecommunication Company Ltd discontinued telegram service on 27 January 2006.
Lithuania	2007	Teo LT discontinued telegram service on 15 October 2007.
Slovakia	2007	The Slovak Post discontinued telegram service on 1 January 2007.
Thailand	2008	Thailand Post discontinued telegram service on 30 April 2008, at 20.00 local time.
Nepal	2009	Nepal Telecom discontinued telegram service on 1 January 2009.
Czechia	2010	Česká pošta discontinued the service in 2010, because it was too expensive to maintain and only 756 telegrams were sent in 2009.
Indonesia	2010	Pos Indonesia discontinued telegram service in 2010.
Australia	2011	Australia Post closed its telegram service on 7 March 2011.
Estonia	2012	Eesti Post discontinued the telegram service in 2012.
Malaysia	2012	Telekom Malaysia discontinued telegram service on 1 July 2012.
India	2013	BSNL discontinued telegram service on 15 July 2013. Telegrams to foreign countries had been discontinued in May 2013. Telegrams from other countries can still be received via the postal service.
Philippines	2013	The government's Telecommunications Office or Tanggapan ng Telekomunikasyon discontinued telegram service on 20 September 2013. The last telegram was sent on that day at 3:15 PM.
Sri Lanka	2013	Sri Lanka Post stopped its telegram service after 157 years on 30 September 2013, although still offers "Telemail" and "e-Telemail", where customers can deliver an urgent message at the counter or online, respectively, "which is then promptly forwarded to the destination office via direct telephone and delivered to the recipient within two hours."
United States	2013	The FCC ceased enforcing telegram regulations in 2013, and telegraph service was formally deregulated in 2017. Some courier and fax services advertise themselves as "telegrams" but are not in fact distinguishable from fax or registered mail.
Belgium	2017	Proximus discontinued telegram service on 29 December 2017. It sent 63,000 telegrams in 2010, which declined to 8,000 in 2017.
Poland	2018	telegramy.pl offers an online telegram service, delivering telegrams the next day as ordinary mail. Poczta Polska closed its telegram service on 1 October 2018.
France	2018	Orange S.A. closed its telegram service on 30 April 2018.
Iceland	2018	Íslandspóstur discontinued its telegram service on 1 October 2018. The first telegram in Iceland was sent in 1906 to Seyðisfjörður from the Faroe Islands.
Ukraine	2018	Ukrtelecom discontinued telegram service on 1 March 2018.
Greece	2019	OTE, the former state owned telecommunications provider closed the telegram service in March 2019.
Hungary	2021	Magyar Posta closed its telegram service on 29 April 2021
Germany	2022	Deutsche Post offered telegram service until 31 December 2022, delivering telegrams the next day as ordinary mail. Deutsche Telekom discontinued service to foreign countries on 31 December 2000.
South Korea	2023	KT Corporation ended their telegram service in December 2023.
Switzerland	1999	Swisscom discontinued telegram service in 1999 following the breakup of PTT (Switzerland) into two companies: Swisspost and Swisscom.
