= Postage stamps and postal history of Bosnia and Herzegovina =

This is a survey of the postage stamps and postal history of Bosnia and Herzegovina.

== Austria-Hungary ==
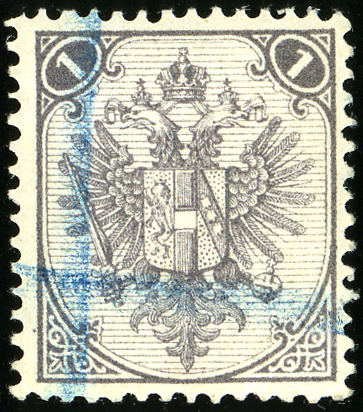
1 kreuzer first issue 1879, lithographed

The first issue in 1879 for Bosnia and Herzegovina, soon after its occupation by Austria-Hungary in 1878, is a stamp without any text, but representing the Austrian double-eagle coats of arms.

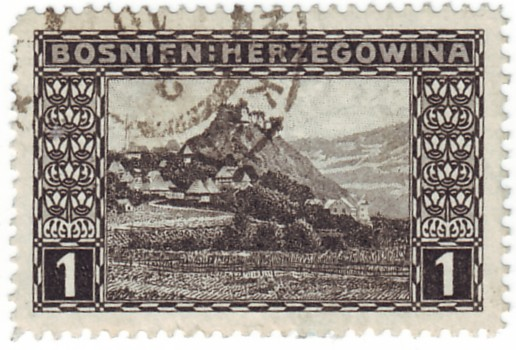
1906 stamp depicting Doboj

Stamps inscribed in German Bosnien Herzegowina were produced in 1906, featuring landscapes and monuments, including views of Doboj and the Carshija business quarter of Sarajevo.

A number of military post stamps were produced in the 1910s, many of them depicting Francis Joseph I. Newspaper stamps which included a depiction of a girl in a Bosnian costume (1913) and postage due stamps (1904 and 1916) were also produced.

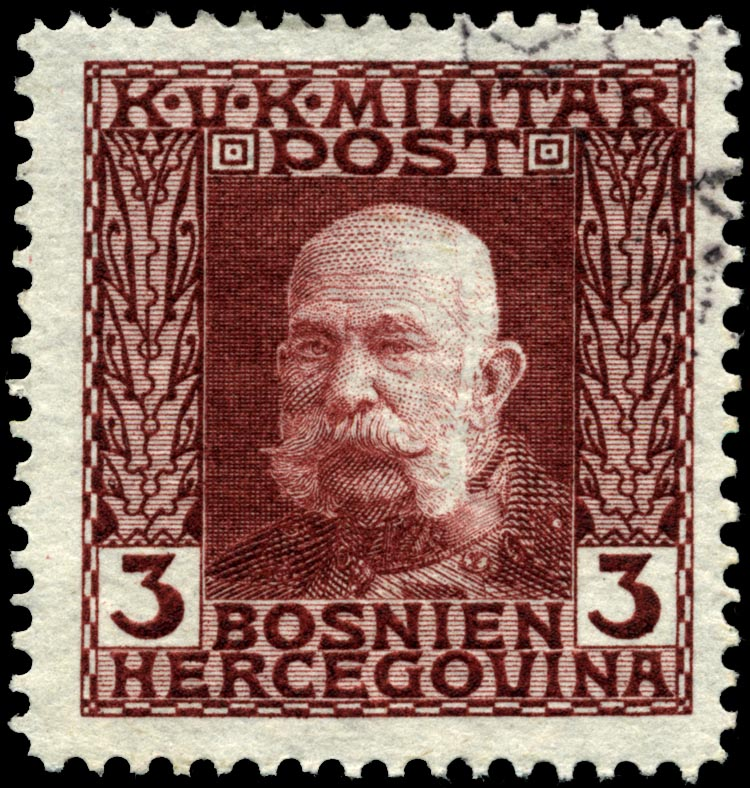
1912 military post stamp depicting Francis Joseph I

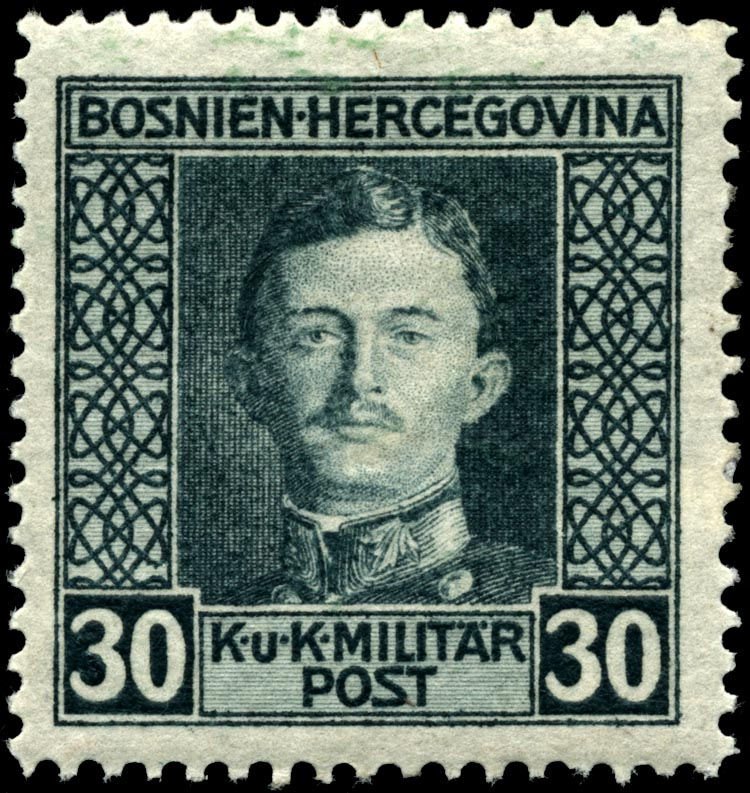
1917 military post stamp

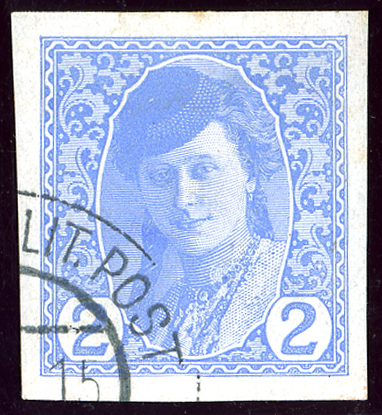
1913 newspaper stamp

== Kingdom in 1918 ==
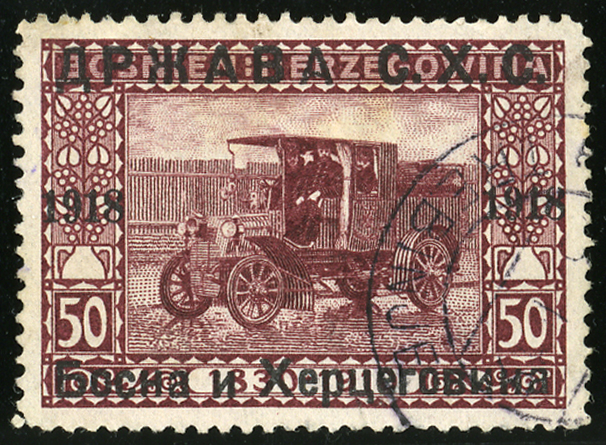
The 1910 issue of Bosnia-Herzegovina overprinted State of Serbs, Croats and Slovenes in 1918

In 1918 Bosnia and Herzegovina was merged in the newly created Kingdom of Serbs, Croats and Slovenians. Bosnia and Herzegovina issued stamps in November 1918 by were overprinting Austrian-issued pictorial stamps of 1910, some in Latin characters reading "DRZAVA S.H.S. / 1918 1918 / Bosna i Hercegovina" ("State of Slovenes, Croats and Serbs / Bosnia and Herzegovina") and others in their Cyrillic equivalent. The first stamps for use throughout the kingdom were issued in January 1921.

The name of the kingdom was changed to the Kingdom of Yugoslavia in 1929, and later becoming the Socialist Federal Republic of Yugoslavia after WWII. Bosnia and Herzegovina used Yugoslav stamps until becoming independent in 1992.

== Independence ==
After the independence in 1992, the country has three postal authorities, corresponding with ethnic and administrative division of the country. The stamps are issued by: Bosnia and Herzegovina post (BH Pošta, Sarajevo), Croatian Post Mostar (HP Mostar, Mostar), and Serbian posts (Srpske pošte, Banja Luka). In Federation of Bosnia and Herzegovina, stamps issued by BH pošta (the areas controlled by Army of Bosnia and Herzegovina in 1995) and HP Mostar (the areas controlled by Croatian Defence Council in 1995) are valid, while in Republika Srpska stamps issued by the Srpske pošte are valid.

=== Federation of Bosnia and Herzegovina ===
BH pošta issue stamps from 27 October 1993, first inscribed Republika Bosna i Hercegovina, and from 1996 just Bosna i Hercegovina. Until 1 October 1998, the currency is Bosnia and Herzegovina dinar, and after that Bosnia and Herzegovina convertible mark. HP Mostar issue stamps from 12 May 1993. Initially the stamps were inscribed by Bosna i Hercegovina / Hrvatska Republika Herceg-Bosna, or abbreviated HR Herceg-Bosna. From 1996, the stamps bear inscription Bosna i Hercegovina, but with a different logo from BH pošta in Sarajevo. Initial currency was Croatian kuna, and from 1999 Bosnia and Herzegovina convertible mark. Both postal authorities from 2011 use double label Bosna i Hercegovina / Federacija Bosne i Hercegovine (sometimes abbreviated as FBiH), maintaining different logos, and areas of use.

=== Republika Srpska ===
Srpske pošte in Banja Luka started to issue stamps on 26 October 1992. The stamps first had label Republika Srpska, and the currency was until 24 December Yugoslav dinar. From 15th of July 2003, the stamps use double label Bosna i Hercegovina / Republika Srpska. The stamps of Republika Srpska usually use the Cyrillic script, so the label reads Рeпублиҝa Српска.

== See also ==
- Postage stamps and postal history of Yugoslavia
