= Boris Novak =

Slovenian manager

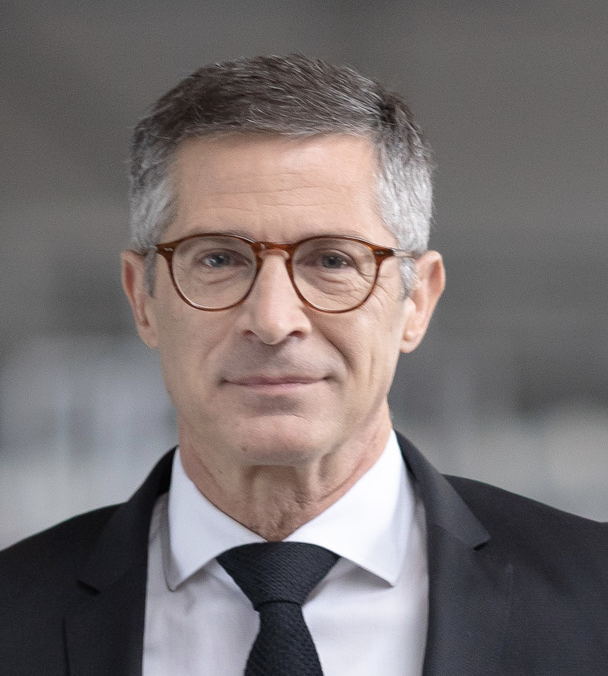
- Boris Novak
- Born: Boris Novak; June 2, 1963 (age 63); Slovenia
- Education: Lawyer
- Alma mater: University of Ljubljana
- Occupation: Manager

Boris Novak (2 June 1963) is a Slovenian manager. He was the CEO of The Post of Slovenia between 2012 and 2021.

== Education and career ==
He graduated from the Faculty of Law in Ljubljana and received his master's degree from the Faculty of Governmental and European Studies. Between 1983 and 2006, he worked as an undersecretary in the Ministry of the Interior, as an assistant director of the Criminal Police Headquarters, and in other positions in the police and the ministry. Between 2006 and 2012, he was the director of the corporate security department at Post of Slovenia.

He became the CEO of The Post of Slovenia in May 2012. In March 2017, the Supervisory Board of The Post granted him a second term. According to Večer, he convinced supervisors and owners "that he could take The Post into digitalisation and business waters, with which the managers of state property would be satisfied."

In June 2020, the government appointed Novak non-executive director of the Bank Assets Management Company (BAMC/DUTB). He also became the Chairman of the BAMC Board of Directors in June 2020. Under Novak's leadership, the post office adjusted the number of branches and replaced some with parcel machines, which resulted in both praise and criticism. The post office generates a profit under his leadership.

Among Novak's successes, the media consider also the takeover of the logistics company Intereuropa in May 2019, which Večer described as a "victory", beating the British logistics company Xpediator. Announcing the takeover in 2018, Novak expressed the view that "domestic capital should retain strategic banking, transport and logistics investments so as not to witness such and other partial interests, and I do not mean only political ones." At the time of the takeover, he said that they wanted to "be one of the best and largest logistics companies in the region and be a quality distributor of packages". When the Post of Slovenia bought 72 percent of Intereuropa, Večer wrote that Novak is "so to speak the head of the largest Slovenian logistic corporation." The purchase price was around one hundred million euros.

He is the Chairman of the Supervisory Board of Intereuropa. Novak was the chairman of the supervisory board of Večer, The Post Bank of Slovenia, Dravske elektrarne, a member of the supervisory board of the Sports Lottery, a member of the expert council for a friendly and efficient public sector at the Ministry of Justice and Public Administration, a member of the strategic council of the Faculty of Computer and Information Science, University of Ljubljana and a member of the Association of Slovenian Supervisors.

Among Novak's successes, the media also consider successful negotiations with trade unions and the improvement of the position of The Post employees. During Novak's tenure at the Post Office, he received the European Energy Manager International Award in 2013, and received the Silver Award for Quality from the Universal Postal Union. According to media reports, in 2016 the Post entered into a partnership with Deutsche Post and in 2019 the Post introduced the most advanced equipment for routing packages. He participated in international and domestic management meetings. Novak was the Post's CEO until March 2021 when Tomaž Kokot was appointed the interim CEO.

== Personal ==
As of 2021, Novak is married, has run the Berlin Marathon and the New York City Marathon. Novak told the Slovenian newspaper Finance that he earned his first money working in the construction industry for a summer job, which still benefits him today for minor house maintenance work. He also said that with a lottery win he would buy "a property in the heart of the Slovenian mountains, and part of it would be used to help promising young athletes from a socially vulnerable environment."

According to Večer, Novak was a member of the SDS and that "his heart beats more on the right." About the prime minister Janez Janša, Novak said that he was "an experienced politician with a mileage and would be a suitable prime minister at a time when we have another EU presidency." After the resignation of prime minister Marjan Šarec, the media mentioned Novak as a possible minister.
