= Post horn =

Brass instrument

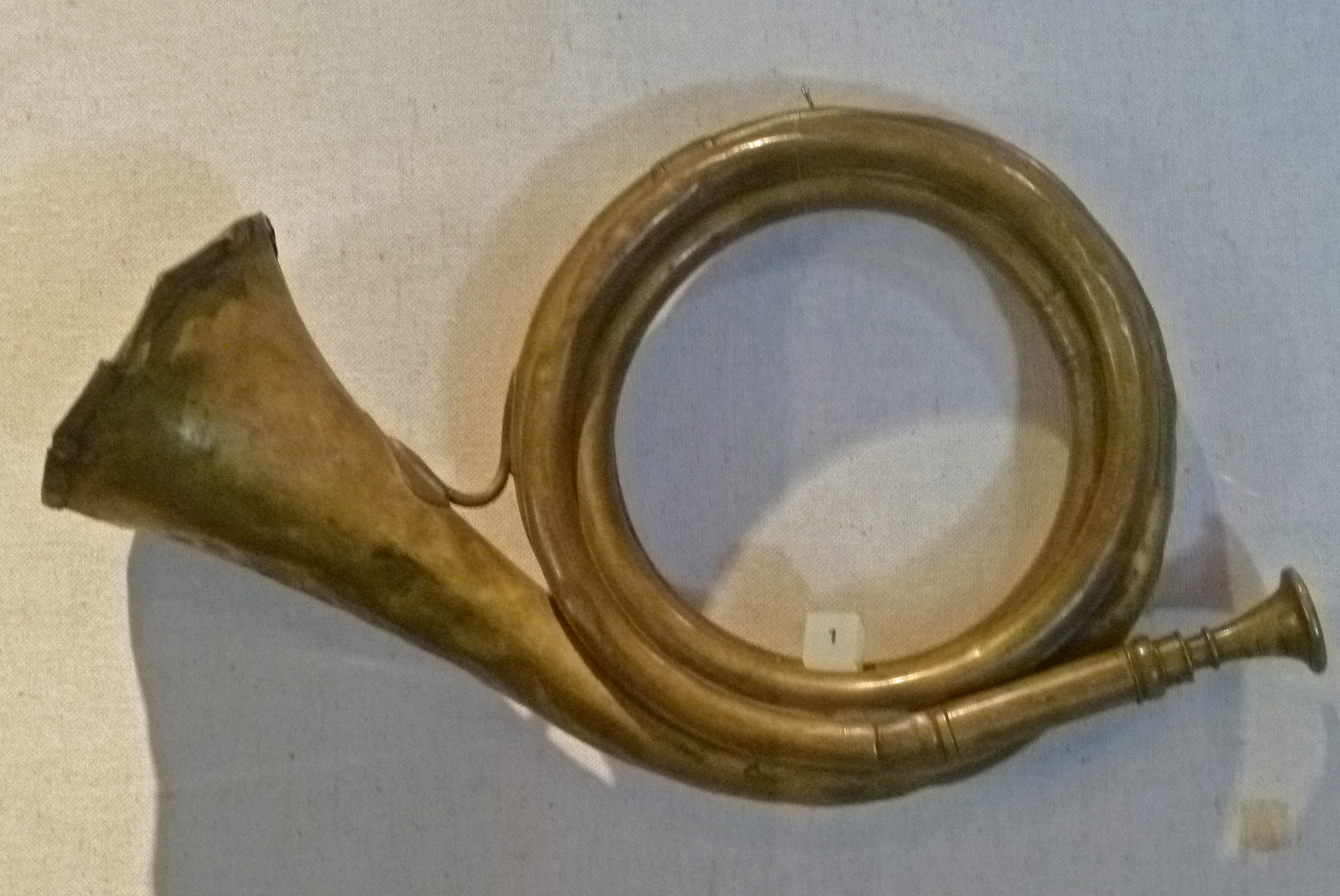
German post horn (19th century)

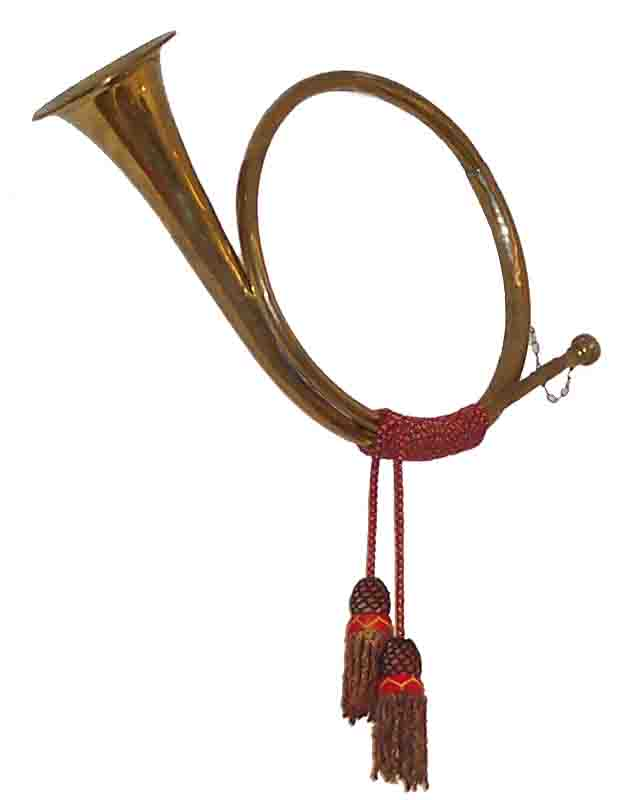
Post horn

The post horn is a valveless cylindrical brass instrument with a cupped mouthpiece. The instrument was used to signal the arrival or departure of a post rider or mail coach. It was used by postilions of the 18th and 19th centuries.

== Use and construction ==
The post horn is sometimes confused with the coach horn, and even though the two types of horn served the same principal purpose, they differ in their physical appearance. The post horn has a cylindrical bore and was generally used on a coach pulled by two horses (technically referred to as "Tonga"); hence, it is sometimes also called the Tonga horn. The coach horn, on the other hand, has a conical bore and was used on a coach pulled by four horses (referred to as a "four-in-hand"). The post horn is no more than 32 inches (810 mm) in length, whereas the coach horn can be up to 36 inches (910 mm) long. The latter has more of a funnel-shaped bell, while the former's bell is trumpet-shaped. Post horns need not be straight but can be coiled—they have a smaller bore—and they are made entirely of brass. A post horn will have a slide for tuning if intended for orchestral settings.

The instrument is an example of a buisine, a precursor to the "natural" trumpet. The cornet was developed from the cone-shaped coach horn through the addition of valves, while the cylinder-shaped trumpets remained predominantly valveless for several decades.

== Compositions with/for the post horn ==
=== Beer's Concerto ===
In the late 17th century, Johann Beer composed a Concerto à 4 in B♭, which paired a post horn with a corne de chasse as the two solo instruments, accompanied by violins and basso continuo.

=== Mozart's Posthorn Serenade ===
Mozart composed his Serenade No. 9, the "Post horn Serenade", in 1779. The second trio of the 6th movement, the Menuetto, features a solo of the posthorn.

=== Mahler and others ===
Mahler and others incorporated the post horn into their orchestras for certain pieces. On such occasions, the orchestra's trumpet player usually performs with the instrument. One example of post horn use in modern classical music is the famous off-stage solo in Mahler's Third Symphony. Due to the scarcity of this instrument, however, music written for it is usually played on a trumpet, cornet or flugelhorn.

=== Post Horn Galop ===
In 1844, the German cornet player Hermann Koenig wrote Post Horn Galop as a solo for post horn with an orchestral accompaniment. In the 20th century it became a popular piece for brass bands. It has been the walk-on music for the Leicester City Football Club since 1935.

=== Compositions for other instruments imitating a post horn ===
An imitation of the post horn's fanfare was a commonly used in music describing, or referring to, the post coach or travel in general. Notable musical examples include Capriccio on the departure of a beloved brother by Bach, which includes an "Aria di postiglione" and a "Fuga all'imitazione della cornetta di postiglione", both containing an octave jump similar to that of the postal horn.

Handel's Belshazzar includes in the second act a "Sinofonia" that uses a similar motif (subtitled Allegro postilions) depicting Belshazzar's messengers leaving on a mission. A very similar movement is included in the third "Production" of Telemann's Tafelmusik. Beethoven's Les adieux piano sonata is centered on a horn-like motif, again signifying the departure of a loved-one. Schubert's Winterreise includes the song "Die Post", of which the piano part prominently features a horn signal motif.

== Other uses ==
During World War I, in Austria-Hungary and Germany, wooden post horns were used as a means of collecting war donations via a method called the Nail Men. People would donate money, and in exchange be allowed to hammer a nail into the horn until the horn was completely covered.

== The post horn as graphical symbol ==
The post horn is used in the logo of national post services of many countries. The post horn is included in Unicode as U+1F4EF 📯 POSTAL HORN.

=== List of postal services that include the post horn in their logos ===
- Correo Argentino (Argentina)
- Australia Post (Australia)
- Bâlgarski poshti (Bulgaria)
- Belposhta (Belarus)
- Bpost (Belgium) – features a stylistic postal horn
- Česká pošta (Czech Republic)
- Correos (Spain)
- CTT (Portugal) – features a rider on horseback carrying a straight horn
- Cyprus Postal Services (Cyprus)
- Deutsche Post (Germany)
- Omniva (formerly Eesti Post, Estonia)
- Hrvatska pošta (Croatia)
- Íslandspóstur (Iceland)
- Jersey Post (Jersey)
- Lietuvos paštas (Lithuania)
- Magyar Posta (Hungary)
- MaltaPost (Malta) – features a horn with a Maltese cross in the middle
- North Macedonia Post (North Macedonia)
- Österreichische Post (Austria)
- Poczta Polska (Poland)
- Poșta Moldovei (Moldova)
- Poșta Română (Romania)
- Pochta Rossii (Russia)
- Posta Shqiptare (Albania)
- Pošta Slovenije (Slovenia)
- Post Danmark (Denmark)
- PostBus Switzerland (Switzerland)
- PTT (Turkey)
- Slovenská pošta (Slovakia)
- Tajikistan Post (Tajikistan)
- Ukrposhta (Ukraine)

Until 2002, the Finnish Postal and Telegraph Administration (Posti- ja lennätinhallitus) and its successors also featured a postal horn in their logos. The logo from 1987 onwards had a single symbol combining the postal horn and telegraph symbols.

=== Post horns in road signs ===
In Italy the post horn was featured on a sign called Obbligo di arresto all'incrocio con autobus di linea su strade di montagna ("Stop when encountering coaches on mountain roads"). Installed along winding, narrow mountain roads, the sign indicated that motorists should yield to incoming coaches, and let them pass safely. This sign was removed from the Italian Road Code in 1992.

=== Examples of post horns as graphics ===
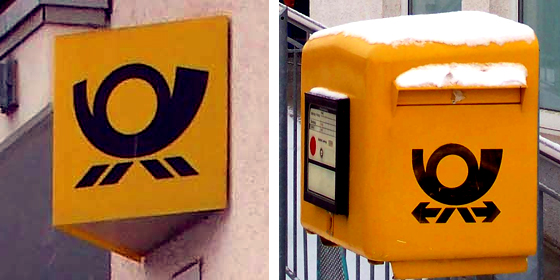
German sign and postbox with post horn logos

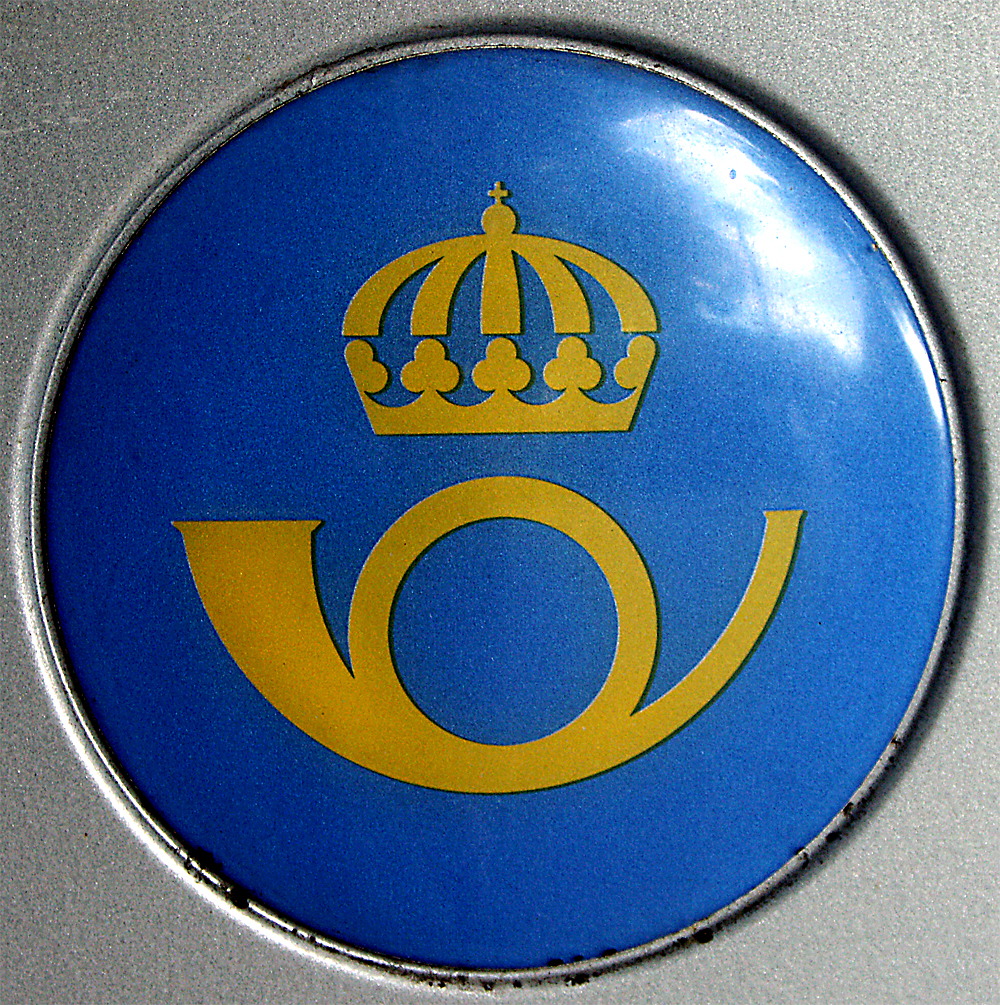
Post horn logo from Sweden

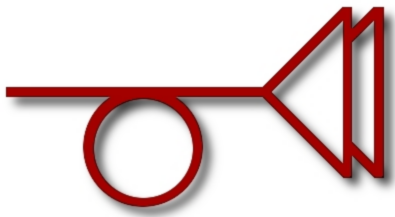
Muted post horn from The Crying of Lot 49

Postal Horn Emoji from Google Noto, U+1F4EF

Old "Stop when encountering coaches on mountain roads" road sign from Italy (removed from the Italian Road Code in 1992)

== See also ==
- French horn
- Pesthörnchen (CCC)
- Little Post Horn Squid
- The Crying of Lot 49, by Thomas Pynchon
- Postage stamps and postal history of Germany
- Postage stamps and postal history of Norway
- Serenade No. 9 (Mozart), the "Posthorn" serenade
- Long Live the Post Horn!, novel by Vigdis Hjorth
