= Postal codes in Cyprus =

Postal codes in Cyprus have been made up of four digits since 1 October 1994. They are administered by Cyprus Post.

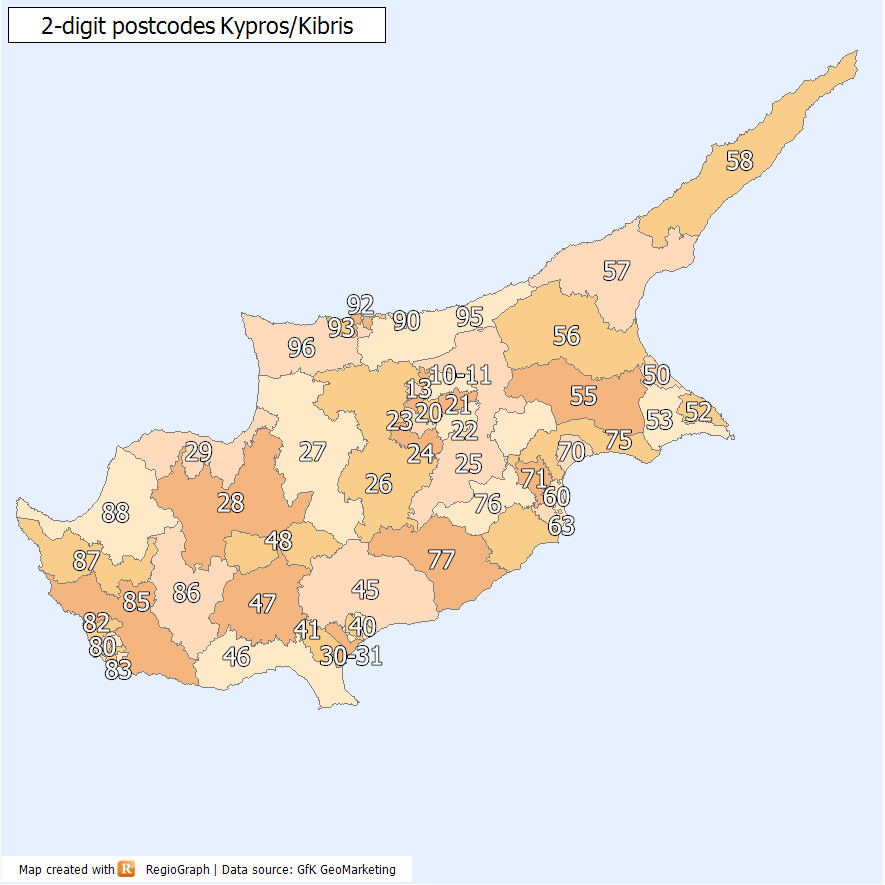
2-digit postcode areas Cyprus (defined by the first two postcode digits)

== Postal districts ==
The system is organised around the six administrative districts for local government on the island, with each district allocated a numerical range. Most of the four digit numbers are allocated to small geographic areas, such as streets, urban communes or villages, although some are reserved for government use.

District	Post code range
Nicosia District	from 1000 to 2999
Limassol District	from 3000 to 4999
Famagusta District	from 5000 to 5999
Larnaca District	from 6000 to 7999
Paphos District	from 8000 to 8999
Kyrenia District	from 9000 to 9999

== Northern Cyprus ==
Due to the division of Cyprus, only the (internationally-recognised) Republic of Cyprus uses this post code system. Mail sent to the de facto state of Northern Cyprus must instead be addressed to via Mersin 10, TURKEY via Mersin in southern Turkey. However, five-digit postcodes were introduced in northern Cyprus in 2013, in a similar format to those of Turkey, with the first two digits being 99, and the last three indicating the locality.

== British bases ==
The two British Sovereign Base Areas (or SBAs) of Akrotiri and Dhekelia are not part of the Republic of Cyprus, although the Cypriot villages within these areas use the Cyprus post code system. British military organisations and personnel use British Forces Post Office numbers, BFPO 57 for Akrotiri and BFPO 58 for Dhekelia.
