= Serenade No. 9 (Mozart) =

1779 composition by W. A. Mozart

- Posthorn
- by W. A. Mozart
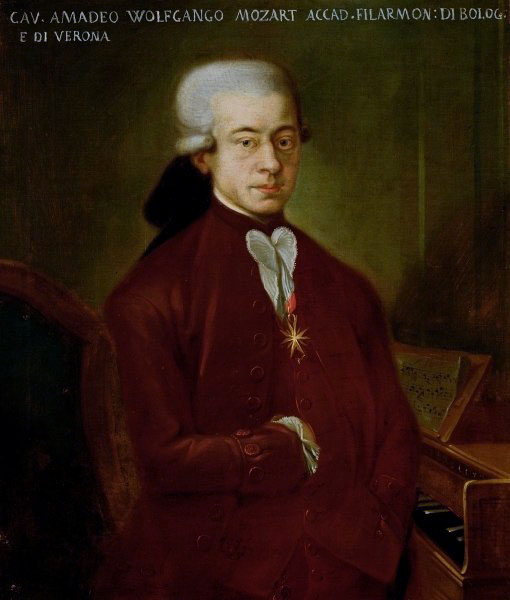
- 1777 Bologna portrait of Mozart
- Key: D major
- Catalogue: K. 320
- Occasion: End of term
- Commissioned by: University of Salzburg
- Composed: Salzburg, 1779
- Performed: 1779
- Duration: c. 45 minutes
- Movements: 7
- Scoring: Orchestra with posthorn

The Serenade for Orchestra No. 9 in D major, K. 320, Posthorn, was written by Wolfgang Amadeus Mozart in Salzburg, in 1779. The manuscript is dated 3 August 1779 and was intended for the University of Salzburg's "Finalmusik" ceremony that year.

The serenade is scored for two flutes, piccolo, two oboes, two bassoons, two horns, two trumpets, post horn, timpani and strings. This scoring is unusually large for a work of this type. Normally, the same players would play oboe and flute, but in this case they appear simultaneously. The timpani, also, were not usually part of the serenade orchestra.

It has seven movements:

1. Adagio maestoso – Allegro con spirito,
2. Minuetto, 3/4
3. Concertante: Andante grazioso in G major, 3/4
4. Rondeau: Allegro ma non troppo in G major, 2/4
5. Andantino in D minor, 3/4
6. Minuetto – Trio 1 and 2, 3/4
7. Finale: Presto,

The Concertante and Rondeau movements feature prominent concertante sections for flutes, oboes, and bassoons. These were performed on their own in a concert in the old Vienna Burgtheater on 23 March 1783, along with the Haffner symphony, an aria from Idomeneo, and several other works.

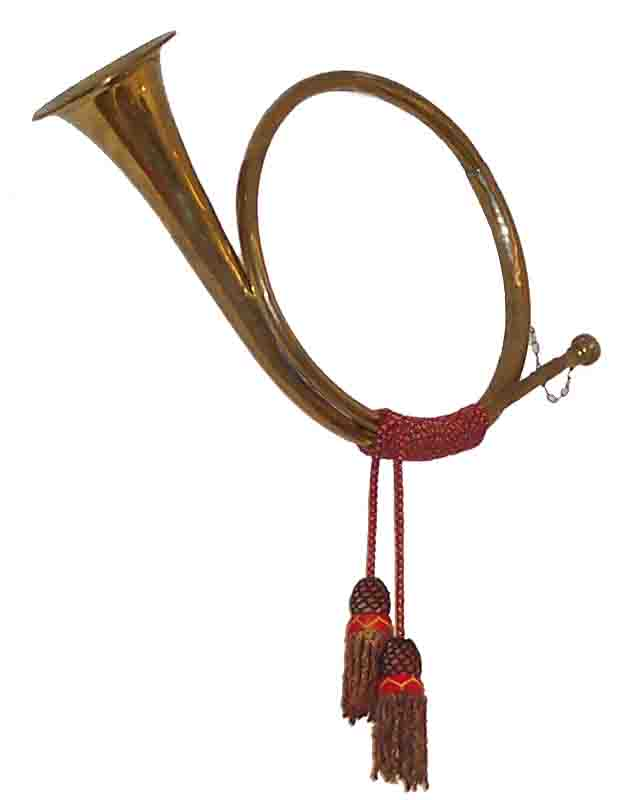
A post horn, for which this serenade is nicknamed

The first trio of the second minuet features a solo piccolo (called "flautino" in the manuscript) played over strings. The second trio of the second minuet features a solo for the post horn. This solo gives the serenade its nickname.

A typical performance lasts approximately 45 minutes and is often performed together with the two marches in D major, K. 335, each one preceding and following the serenade respectively.

== Discography ==
Below is an incomplete list of recordings.

Year	Conductor	Orchestra	Label	Has K. 335?
1983	James Levine	Vienna Philharmonic	Deutsche Grammophon	No
1984	Nikolaus Harnoncourt	Staatskapelle Dresden	Teldec	Yes
1985	Charles Mackerras	Prague Chamber Orchestra	Telarc	No
1985	Neville Marriner	Academy of St. Martin in the Fields	Philips Classics	Yes
1987	János Rolla	Franz Liszt Chamber Orchestra	Hungaroton	Yes
1990	Martin Turnovský	Capella Istropolitana	Naxos	No
1992	Claudio Abbado	Berlin Philharmonic	Sony Classical	Yes
1994	Colin Davis	Bavarian Radio Symphony Orchestra	BMG Music	No
1996	Wolfgang Gröhs	Europa Symphony	Arte Nova Classics	No
1996	Christopher Hogwood	Academy of Ancient Music	Éditions de l'Oiseau-Lyre	Yes
2014	Nikolaus Harnoncourt	Concentus Musicus Wien	Sony Classical	Yes (No. 1 only)
2024	Vahan Mardirossian	Czech Philharmonic Chamber Orchestra	Brilliant Classics	No
2025	Reinhard Goebel	Mozarteum Orchestra Salzburg	Berlin Classics	Yes
