= Johann Beer =

Austrian author, court official and composer

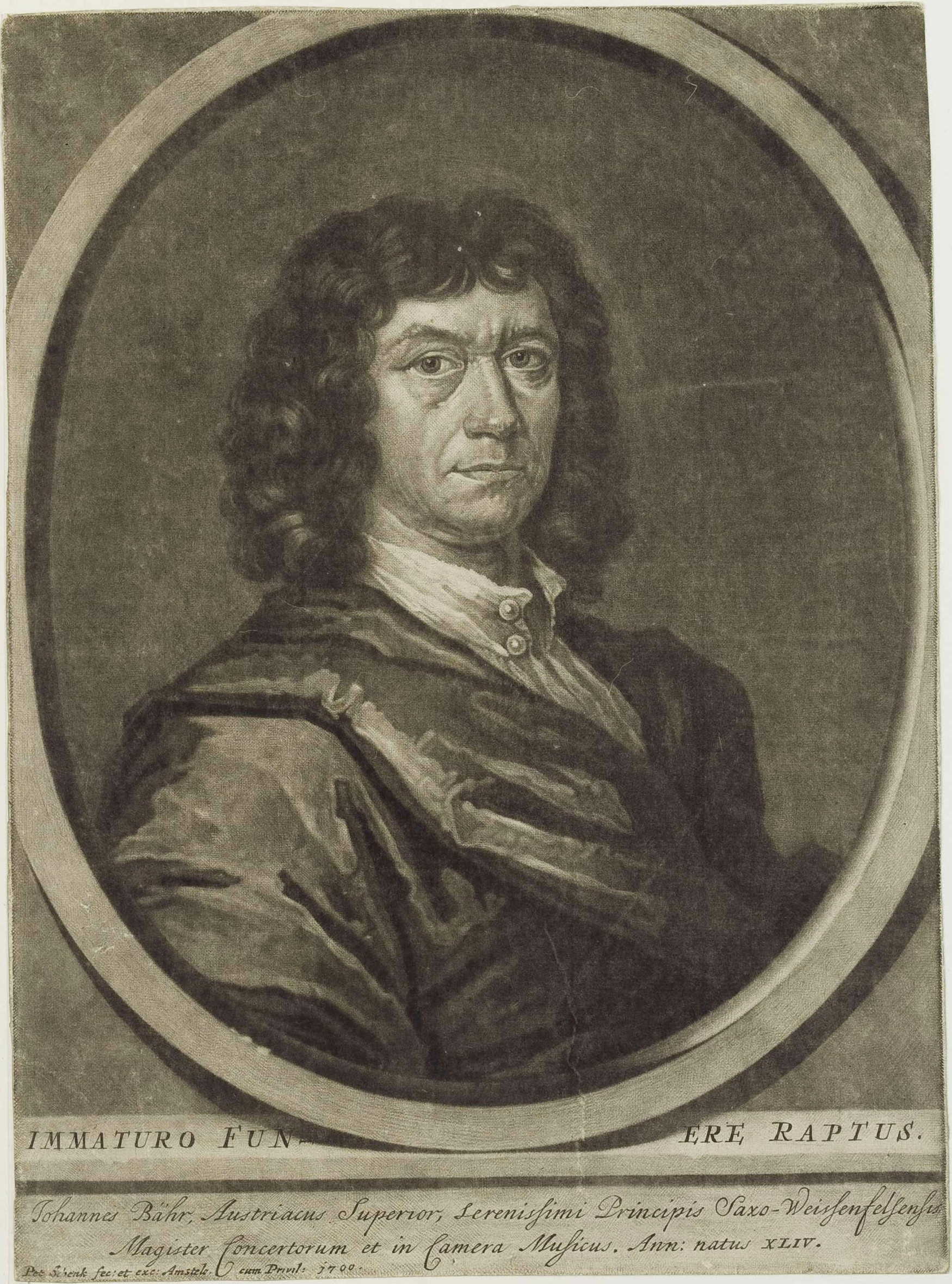
Johann Beer by Peter Schenk the Elder

Johann Beer (also spelled Bähr, Baer, or Behr, Latinized as Ursus or Ursinus; (28 February 1655, in Sankt Georgen – 6 August 1700, in Weissenfels) was an Austrian author, court official and composer.

== Biography ==
Beer was born in Austria to Protestant parents. In 1676, he entered the service of Augustus, Duke of Saxe-Weissenfels as a countertenor. In 1700, he died, aged 45, as the result of a hunting accident.

His comic writings are reminiscent of Hans Jakob Christoffel von Grimmelshausen.

His work of music theory Musikalische Discurse reveals German baroque performance practice.

== Works and editions ==
Comic novels

- Der Simplicianische Welt-Kucker. The Simplician World-Observer 4 Vols. Halle and Saale 1677–79
- Der Abenteuerliche Ritter Hopffen-Sach. The adventurous Knight Hop-Sack. Halle 1678
- Der Politische Feuermäuer-Kehrer. Leipzig 1682
- Teutsche Winternächte. Nuremberg 1682, English translation German winter nights 1988.

Music theory

- Musikalische Discurse durch die Philosophie deducirt

Music

- Missa S. Marcellini for 8 soloists and double choir.
- Concerto a 4 for posthorn, hunting horn, and strings in B-flat.

== See also ==
- List of Austrian writers
- Free scores by Johann Beer at the International Music Score Library Project (IMSLP)
