= Pošta Crne Gore =

- Company type: Joint-stock company
- Industry: Postal service
- Founded: 1841
- Headquarters: Podgorica, Montenegro
- Key people: Milan Martinović (CEO)
- Products: First-class and domestic mail, logistics
- Number of employees: 900
- Website: www.postacg.me

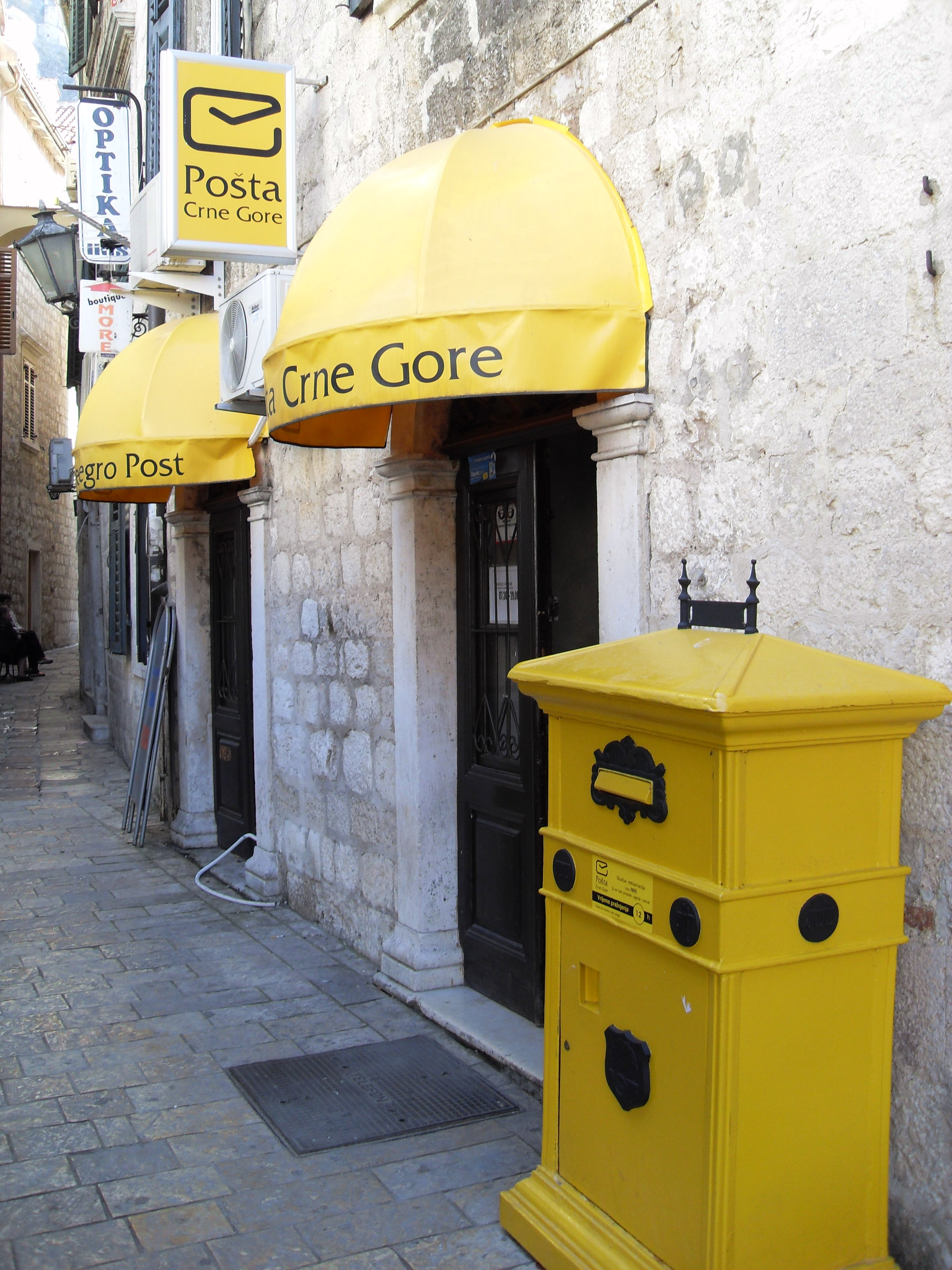
Montenegro Post office, Kotor

Pošta Crne Gore (English: Montenegro Post) is Montenegro's national postal service. It was created on 31 December 1998 following the division of PTT Montenegro into two separate organisations, one handling telecommunications (Crnogorski Telekom) and one handling postal service (Pošta Crne Gore). Montenegro has had a postal service in operation since 1841.

== History ==
Public postal traffic was introduced in Montenegro in 1841. This was followed in 1854 by the first post office built on the territory of Montenegro, on the initiative of the Austrians. The first Montenegrin stamps, with images of King Nikola were printed in 1874, with the opening of a post office in Cetinje, the first belonging officially to Montenegro. The opening of this post office was marked with a ceremony attended by King Nikola. Post boxes were introduced in 1897.

Montenegro was admitted into the Universal Postal Union on 2 October 1874. In 2024, the company celebrated 150 years of postal services and membership of the union in Montenegro. To celebrate this, and record profits of €2.5 million, they acquired 220 new mopeds for mail delivery.

In 1903, the Montenegrin Post was the first in Europe to use motor vehicles to fulfill its mission of mail delivery.

On 28 October 1998, the division of PTT Saobraćaja Crne Gore — a Montenegrin postal, telegraph and telephone company — into two new companies was approved: a postal operator (Pošta Crne Gore) and a telecommunications operator (Telekom Crne Gore). It took effect on December 31 of the same year.

== See also ==
- Postage stamps and postal history of Montenegro
