= BH Pošta =

Postal service in Bosnia and Herzegovina

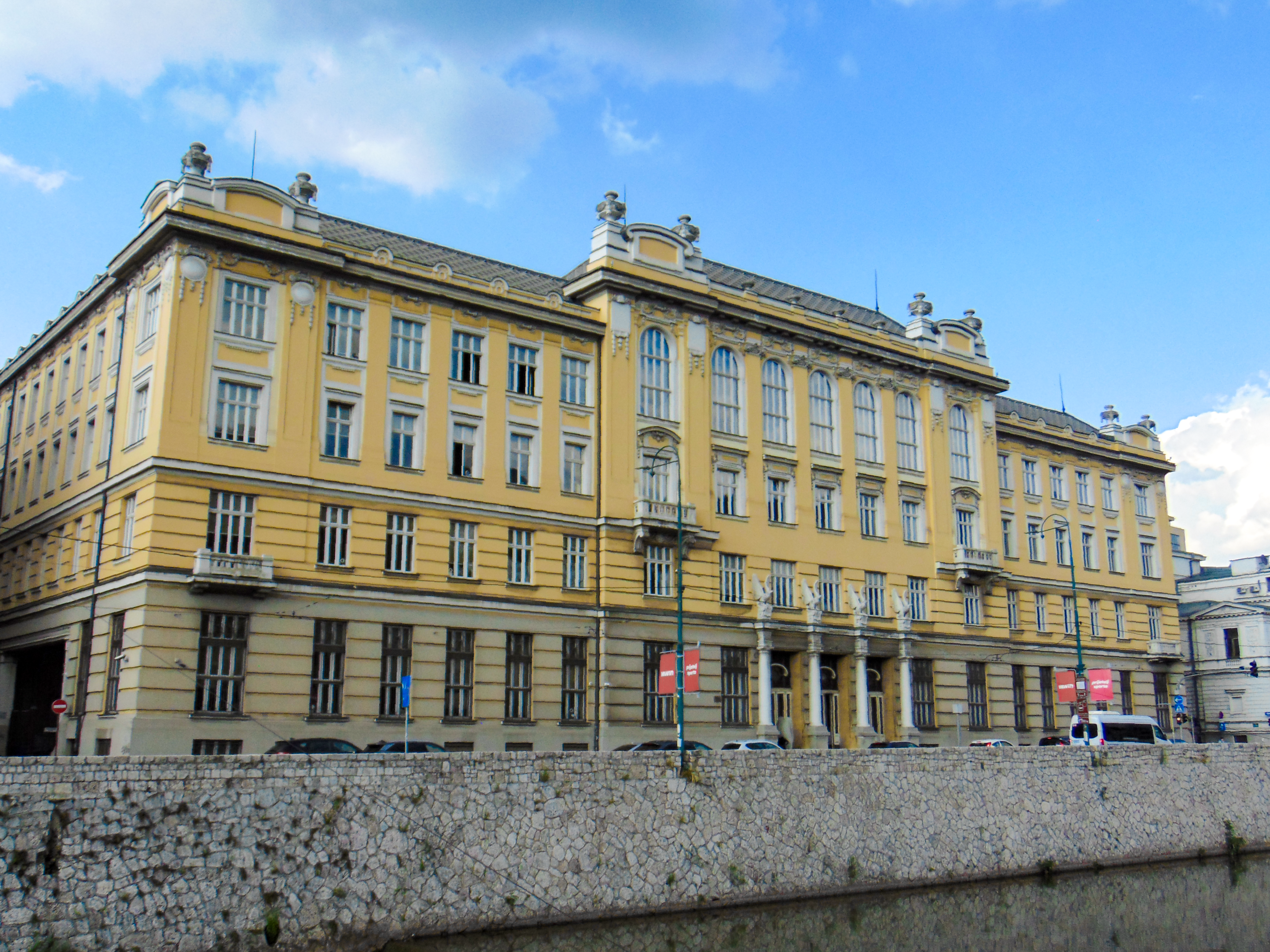
- BH Pošta headquarters in Sarajevo, Bosnia and Hercegovina
- Type: Joint-stock company
- Industry: Postal service
- Founded: 1992; 33 years ago
- Founder: Federation of Bosnia and Herzegovina
- Headquarters: Sarajevo, Bosnia and Herzegovina
- Key people: Adis Šehić (CEO)
- Products: First-class and domestic mail, logistics
- Revenue: ▲BAM 90.0 million (2015)
- Net income: ▲BAM 4.1 million (2015)
- Owner: Government of the Federation of Bosnia and Herzegovina
- Number of employees: 2,300 (2015)
- Website: posta.ba

BH Pošta, officially Više Javno preduzeće BH Pošta d.o.o., is one of three companies responsible for postal service in Bosnia and Herzegovina. The other two are Pošte Srpske and Hrvatska pošta Mostar. BH Pošta operates mainly in Bosniak-majority areas in the Federation of Bosnia and Herzegovina. BH Pošta is the largest postal operator in Bosnia and Herzegovina with a wide network of post offices consisting of 386 units with 822 active counters in total, providing a full spectrum of domestic and international postal services.

== History ==
Early history (1918–1992)

With the introduction of the Banovinas of the Kingdom of Yugoslavia, Bosnia and Herzegovina was administratively divided into three zones, followed by a corresponding division of post offices, so that the offices in Bosnia and Herzegovina were subordinate to the post, telegraph and telephone offices in Sarajevo, Split, Cetinje and Zagreb.

Until the beginning of the Second World War, the postal network of Bosnia and Herzegovina consisted of 188 telegraph and telephone post offices, and in the 1930s, the establishment of a telephone network was started, and the modest beginnings of the introduction of automatic telephone exchanges were recorded in Sarajevo, Ilidža and Trebinje.

After the end of World War II and the establishment of the SFR Yugoslavia, the PTT Directorate in Bosnia and Herzegovina functioned within the framework of the Yugoslav PTT Association (JPTT).

Until 1992, it provided the services of a complete postal network of postal traffic, telephone networks, telegraph networks, and modern data monitoring networks.

During and after the Bosnian War (1992–present)

With the independence of Bosnia and Herzegovina from the Socialist Federal Republic of Yugoslavia (SFRY) in early 1992, the need for a state-owned postal company arose, and thus the present-day company BH Pošta was founded, headquartered in Sarajevo.

During the war in Bosnia and Herzegovina, the postal network of Bosnia and Herzegovina suffered enormous damage, estimated at 900 million US dollars. The greatest symbol of this was the destruction of the main post office building in Sarajevo by the Army of Republika Srpska on May 2, 1992, when it was completely burned down.

In 1993, BH Pošta became a member of the Universal Postal Union.

With the signing of the Dayton Peace Agreement in 1995, which resulted in the end of the war in Bosnia and Herzegovina, the postal network of Bosnia and Herzegovina was divided into three public operators: Pošte Srpske in the territory of Republika Srpska, Croatian Post Mostar in the area formerly controlled by the Croatian Defense Council, and BH Pošta in the area controlled by the Army of the Republic of Bosnia and Herzegovina.

On February 16, 1997, Postbank BH–Postal Bank of Bosnia and Herzegovina was founded, headquartered in Sarajevo.

Due to the diversity of services, a decision by the government of the Federation of Bosnia and Herzegovina on December 20, 1997 resulted in the division of PTT of Bosnia and Herzegovina into BH Telecom and BH Pošta, which have since operated independently.

In addition, in 2001, the reconstruction and adaptation of the main post office building in Sarajevo was completed, for which Ferhad Mulabegović was in charge, and the building once again became the headquarters of the BH Post Office.

== Express Mail ==
BH Post under the name "Express Mail Service" (EMS) provides express delivery services, so-called. Express mail, which consists, in addition to normal express mail, of Urgent Mail and Very Urgent Package.

Any shipment, money order or package can be submitted as an urgent shipment if it contains perishable goods, while it cannot be submitted as an urgent shipment for a wider delivery area, postal threat and poste-restante. In addition, the urgent shipment is sent to the recipient before other shipments. Any package can be submitted as a Very Urgent package, regardless of its type and content, while packages with live animals or perishable goods must always be submitted as a Very Urgent package.

Since February 1, 2010, BH Pošta has also provided express mail services in the areas where Croatian Post Mostar and Pošte Srpske operate as public postal operators, thus ensuring the provision of EMS services for recipients throughout Bosnia and Herzegovina.

From 1 October 2016, a new joint project of the Pošte Srpske, the Croatian Post of Mostar and the BH Pošta, entitled "Fast Post at the level of BiH", will come into effect, which allows the recipient to receive a shipment or package in a maximum of 24 hours, which was not the case until then.

== Electronic money transfer ==
Since March 2016, BH Pošta, in agreement with the Post of Serbia and the Post of Montenegro, has provided the service of sending and receiving money electronically from all branches of these postal operators. Sending money is done at the post office counter, without opening a bank account, and the payment is made within half an hour of the moment of payment.

The price of the electronic money transfer service is 3.66% of the amount paid, which may not be less than 8 KM or more than 50 KM. The price of the service is paid only by the person who sent the money.

BH Pošta plans to provide electronic money transfer services with other countries as well.

== Insurance representation ==
BH Pošta also provides insurance representation services in its branches in the Zenica-Doboj Canton and Sarajevo Canton. Since 15 December 2010, BH Pošta has provided this service in the Sarajevo Canton, and since 8 March 2011 in the Zenica-Doboj Canton. Currently, BH Post represents Sarajevo Insurance and Bosna-Sunce Insurance.

== Philatelic issues ==
In its postage stamp issuance program, BH Pošta distinguishes between commemorative stamps and regular stamps. To date, BH Pošta has also issued stamps in cooperation with other postal operators, such as the postal services of Kuwait and Turkey.

- Commemorative stamps are specially produced to mark a specific event and can typically only be purchased during a specific quarter.
- Regular stamps are issued annually for a specific recurring theme or event.

Regular postage stamps (as of 2016) include:

- Holidays – New Year
- Lakes – Pannonian Lakes in Tuzla
- Cultural and historical heritage – Yellow Fortress
- Traffic safety – Road safety for citizens
- Bridge of Freedom – "Bridge under the bridge"
- World Telecommunication and Information Society Day – Relay on Hum hill
- Religious buildings – Sulejmanija – Šarena Mosque, Travnik
- National monuments/cultural landscapes – Pliva Lakes with the complex of watermills on the river Pliva near Jajce

== Postal codes ==
List of postal codes of the 5 largest municipalities where BH Pošta operates:

Sarajevo: 71000
Zenica: 72101, 72102 and 72112
Tuzla: 75001
Mostar: 88104
Brčko: 76120
