= Cyprus Postal Services =

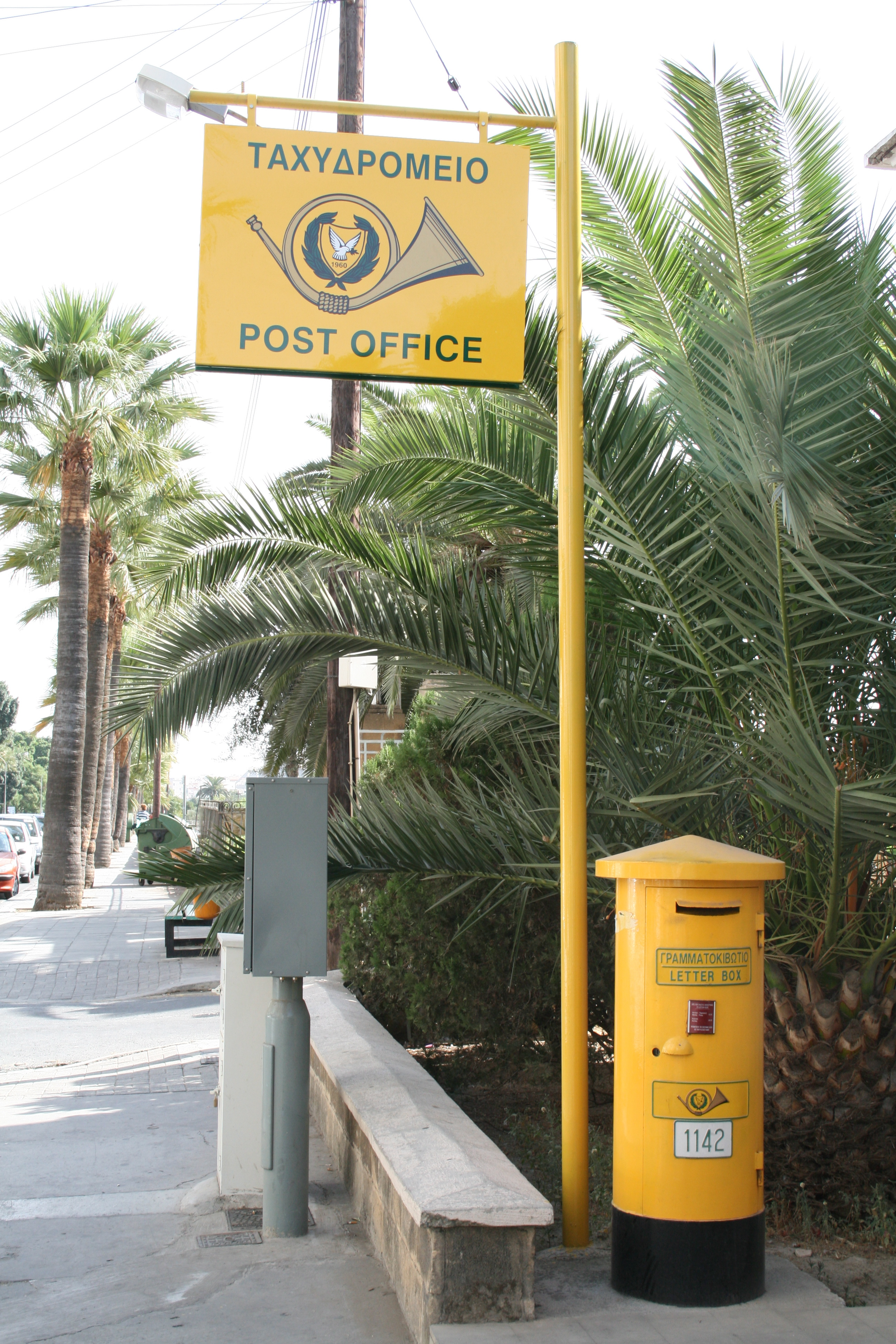
Typical post office sign with modern pillar box

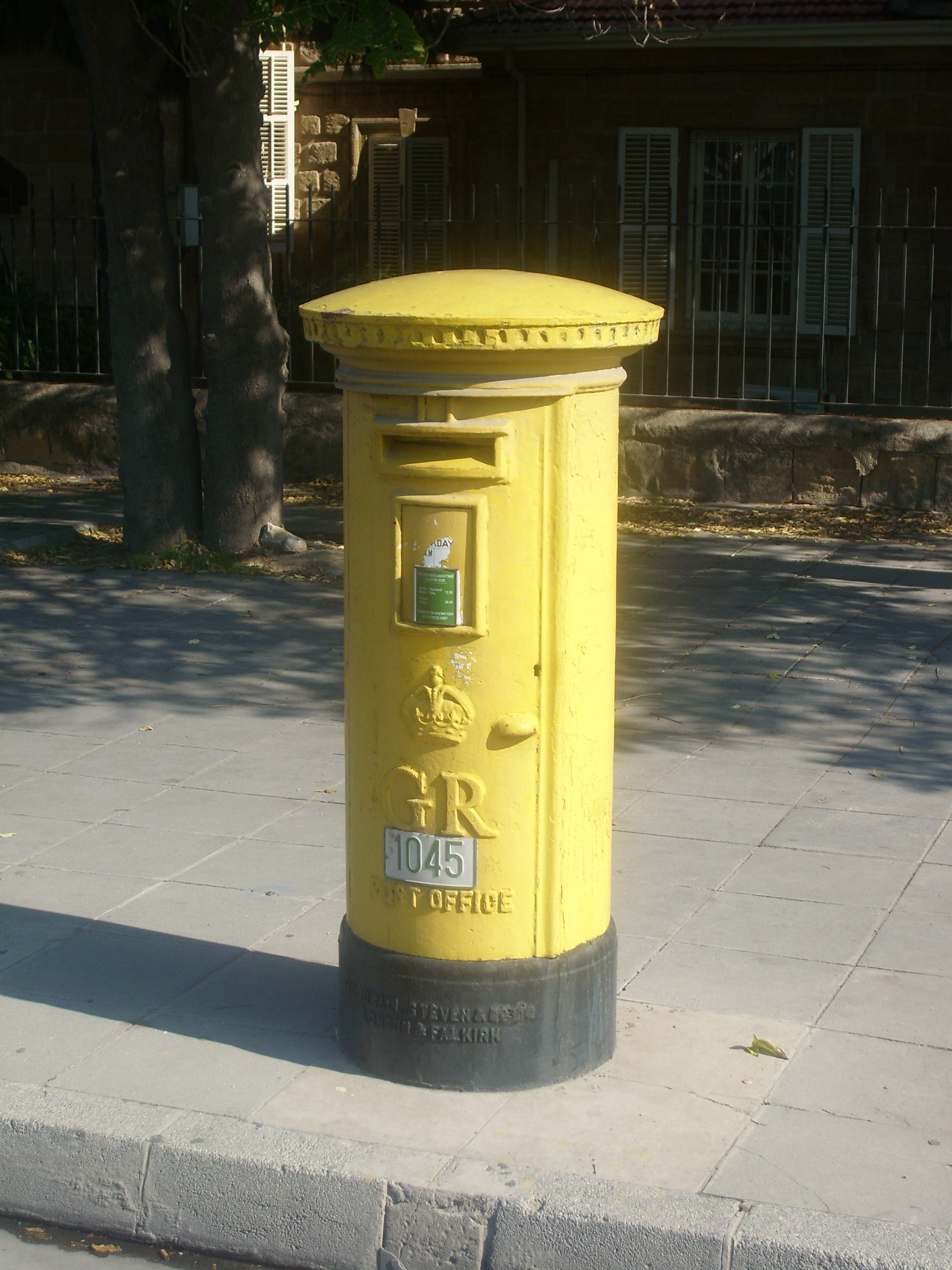
Old pillar box

Cyprus Postal Services, or Cyprus Post (Greek: Κυπριακά Ταχυδρομεία), is the postal operator of Cyprus and operates the government-operated Post Office. A legacy of British colonial rule is the use of pillar boxes (mail boxes) with the initials of the British monarch, although after independence they were painted yellow.

== History ==
Modern postal services in Cyprus began with the takeover of the island by Britain in 1878. Almost immediately the British colonial administration under first British High Commissioner and Governor of Cyprus, Sir Garnet Wolseley, set about establishing a British-style postal service on the island, with S.R. French being dispatched from the General Post Office in London.

In 1994 Cyprus adopted a new postcode. The alphanumerical code precedes the name of the town or city, hence:

CY-1900 NICOSIA
CYPRUS

The 'CY' prefix is only required for mail originating from abroad.

The postcode number ranges for the administrative areas are:

- Nicosia District: 1000–2999
- Limassol District: 3000–4999
- Famagusta District: 5000–5999
- Larnaca District: 6000–7999
- Paphos District: 8000–8999
- Kyrenia District: 9000–9999

The system covers the entire island, including the disputed area under Turkish occupation known as the 'Turkish Republic of Northern Cyprus', but only a few have been allocated. Mail to that part of the island must be sent via 'MERSIN 10, TURKEY', as it is not recognised by the Universal Postal Union.
