= Pošte Srpske =

Postal service company in Republika Srpska

- Company type: Joint-stock company
- Industry: Postal service
- Founded: 1996; 30 years ago
- Headquarters: Banja Luka, Bosnia and Herzegovina
- Key people: Miladin Radović (CEO)
- Products: First-class and domestic mail, logistics
- Revenue: ▲€28.58 million (2016)
- Net income: ▼ (€0.25 million) (2016)
- Total assets: ▲€55.33 million (2016)
- Total equity: ▲€33.35 million (2016)
- Number of employees: 2,267 (2016)
- Website: postesrpske.com

Pošte Srpske (officially Preduzeće za poštanski saobraćaj Republike Srpske a.d.; Serbian Cyrillic: Поште Српске) is one of three companies responsible for postal service in Bosnia and Herzegovina. The other two are BH Pošta and Hrvatska pošta Mostar. Pošte Srpske operates in Republika Srpska. Before the war conflicts in Bosnia and Herzegovina, Post Yugoslavia was responsible for postal services on the territory of SR BiH. However, at the beginning of the war in Bosnia and Herzegovina, the postal system in Bosnia and Herzegovina fell apart. At the beginning, there were frequent occurrences of armed attacks on Post Office vehicles and roadblocks, which made it impossible to carry out postal exchange.
