= Hrvatska pošta Mostar =

Croatian postal service in Bosnia and Herzegovina

Hrvatska pošta d.o.o. Mostar
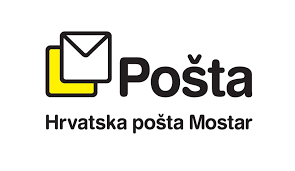
- Company type: Joint-stock company
- Industry: Postal service
- Founded: 1993; 33 years ago
- Headquarters: Tvrtka Miloša bb, Mostar, Bosnia and Herzegovina
- Key people: Mate Rupčić (CEO)
- Products: First-class and domestic mail, logistics
- Number of employees: 728
- Website: www.post.ba

Hrvatska pošta Mostar (lit. 'Croatian Post Mostar') is one of three companies responsible for postal service in Bosnia and Herzegovina. It operates mainly in Croat-majority areas in the Federation of Bosnia and Herzegovina and its headquarters are in Mostar. It was established in 1993. The other two postal operators in the country are BH Pošta (covering the majority of other customers in the Federation of Bosnia and Herzegovina) and Pošte Srpske (operating in Republika Srpska).
