= Post of Slovenia =

State-owned postal organization

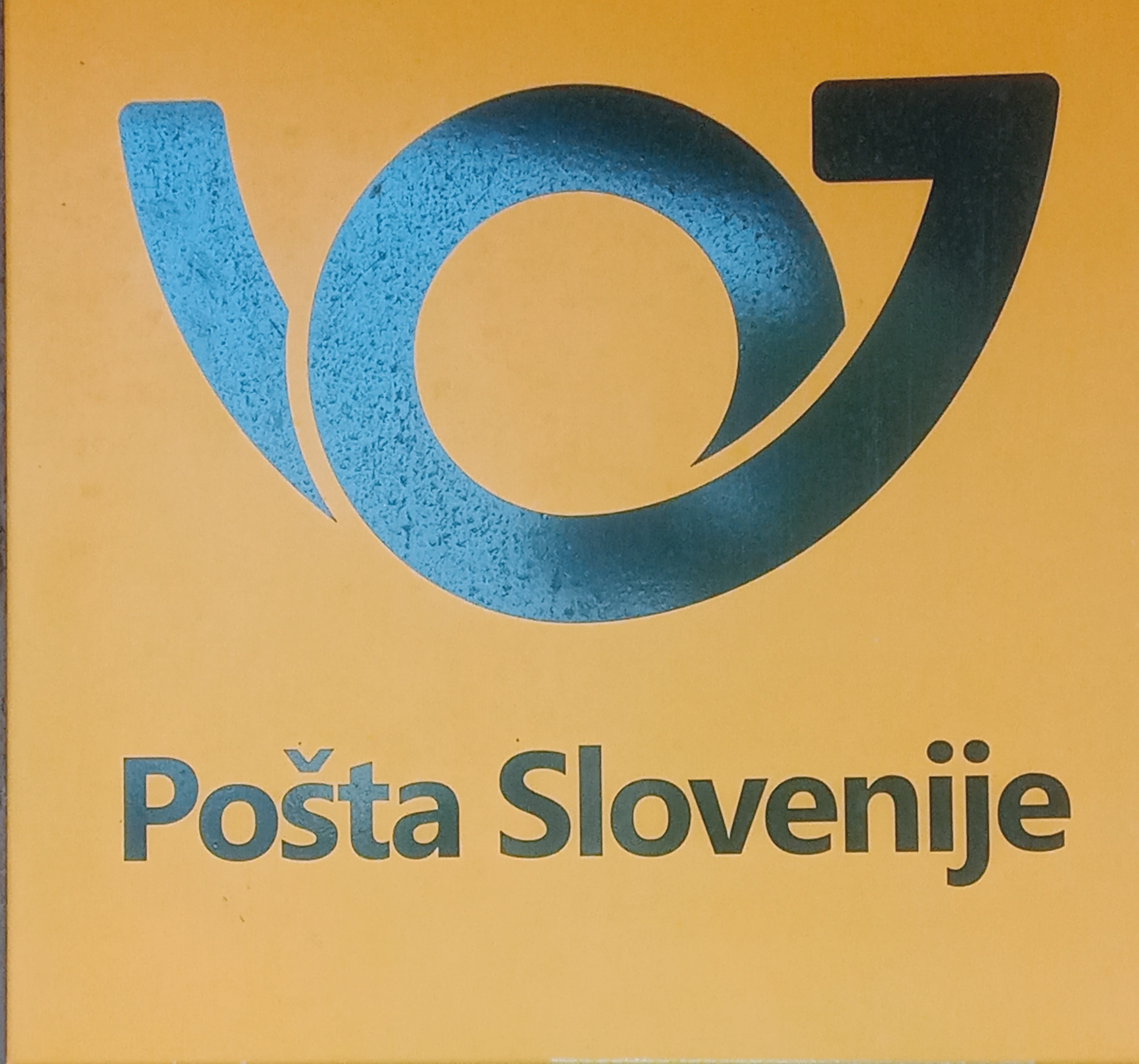
- Native name: Pošta Slovenije d.o.o.
- Company type: Limited liability company with State control
- Predecessor: PTT
- Founded: 1 January 1995
- Headquarters: Maribor, Slovenia
- Website: www.posta.si

The Post of Slovenia (Slovene: Pošta Slovenije; PS) is a Limited liability company with State control, responsible for postal service in Slovenia. The headquarters is located at Slomšek Square 10 (Slomškov trg 10) in Maribor. The current CEO of the Post of Slovenia is Marko Cegnar.

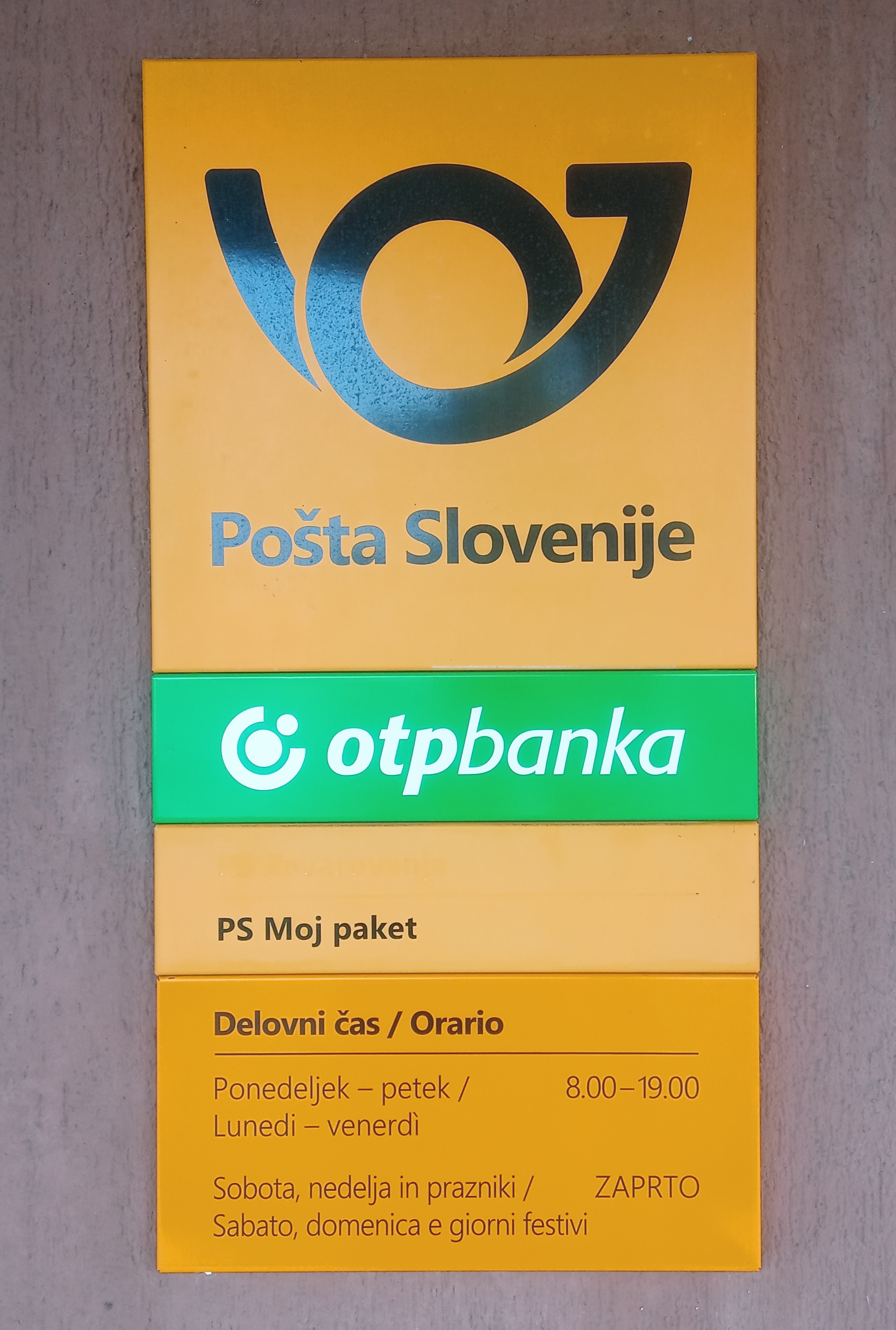
Post office inscription with Post of Slovenia logo (2024)

Slovenia is member of Universal Postal Union (UPU) since 27 August 1992. Pošta Slovenije's executive manager Marjan Osvald, has been elected Deputy Director General of the International Bureau of the UPU for the period 2022-2025.
