= Pillar box =

British free-standing post box

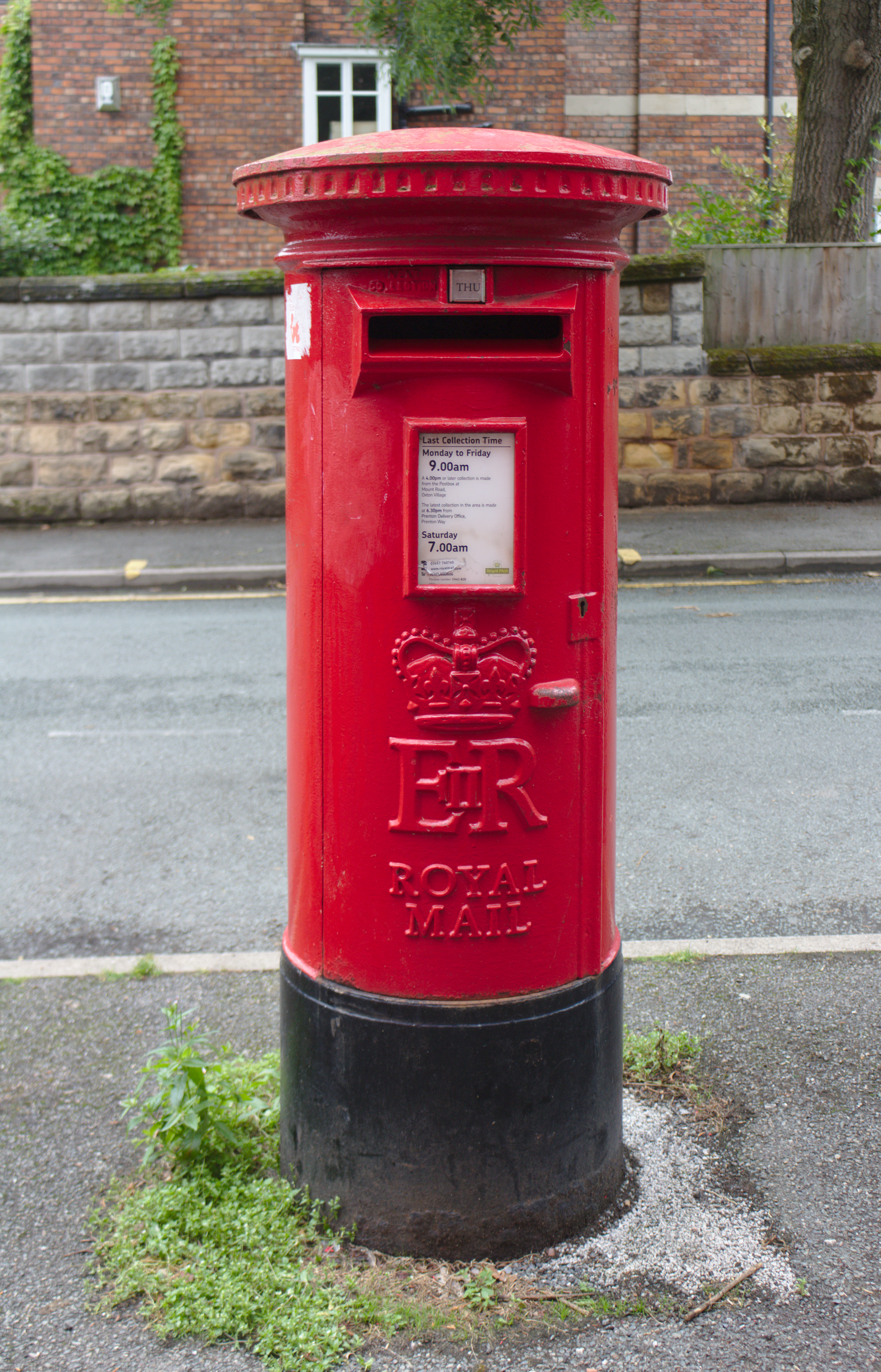
A Queen Elizabeth II Type A pillar box in Birkenhead

Audio description of a George V-era pillar box in Maida Vale by Sir Tony Robinson

A pillar box is a type of free-standing post box. They are found in the United Kingdom and its associated Crown Dependencies and British Overseas Territories, and, less commonly, in several members of the Commonwealth of Nations such as Cyprus, India, Gibraltar, Hong Kong, Malta, New Zealand and Sri Lanka, as well as in the Republic of Ireland. Pillar boxes were provided in territories administered by the United Kingdom, such as Mandatory Palestine, and territories with agency postal services provided by the British Post Office such as Bahrain, Dubai, Kuwait and Morocco. The United Kingdom also exported pillar boxes to countries that ran their own postal services, such as Argentina, Portugal and Uruguay.

Mail is deposited in pillar boxes to be collected by the Royal Mail, An Post or the appropriate postal operator and forwarded to the addressee. The boxes have been in use since 1852, just twelve years after the introduction of the first adhesive postage stamps (Penny Black) and uniform penny post. For the first twenty years, they were found in different colours, but in 1874, they were standardized across Britain to be painted red.

Mail may also be deposited in lamp boxes or wall boxes that serve the same purpose as pillar boxes but are attached to a post or set into a wall. According to the Letter Box Study Group, there are more than 150 recognised designs and varieties of pillar boxes and wall boxes, not all of which have known surviving examples. Like the red telephone box, the red post box is regarded as a British cultural icon. As of 2002, Royal Mail estimates there are over 115,000 post boxes in the United Kingdom.

== Construction ==
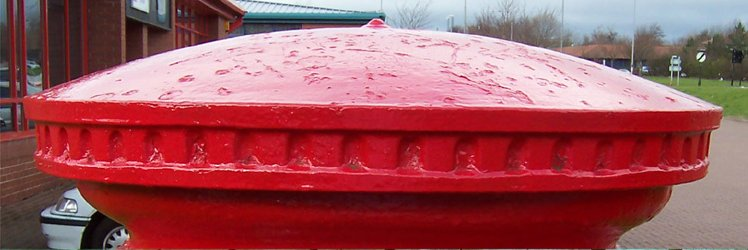
Cast iron cap of a PB42/1 sits atop the box and is secured by bolts

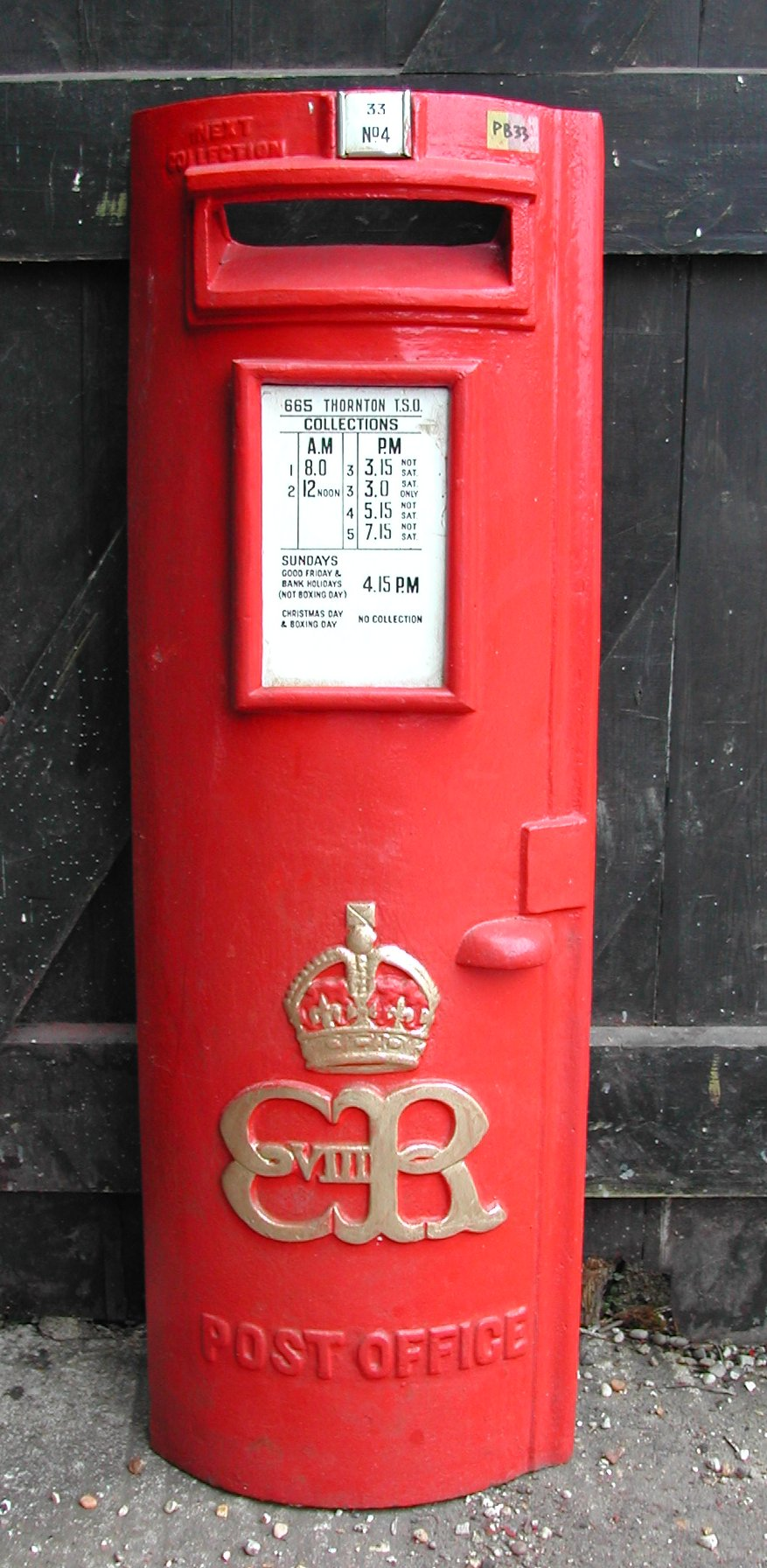
This rare Edward VIII pillar box door shows the built-in posting aperture, collection plate and the royal cypher at Colne Valley Postal History Museum, Halstead, Essex

Most traditional British pillar boxes produced after 1905 are made of cast iron and are cylindrical. Other shapes have been used: the hexagonal Penfolds, rectangular boxes that have not proved to be popular, and an oval shape that is used mainly for the large "double aperture" boxes most often seen in large cities like London and Dublin. In recent years boxes manufactured in glass-fibre or acrylonitrile butadiene styrene (ABS) plastic have been produced that do not follow these general outlines. These are for use in secure indoor locations such as supermarkets.

Cast iron pillar box construction comprises three distinct main parts:

The cap sits on top of the carcass and is usually bolted down from inside. Some designs after 1965 do not have a separate cap. Caps can also be fitted with a separate bracket, normally of cast iron, which supports a Post Office Direction sign (POD) indicating the nearest Post Office.

The door contains the aperture or posting slot. It is hinged, should display the royal cypher of the monarch who was reigning at the time of installation, and may also be fitted with a collection plate showing the times of collection from that location. It is fitted with a brass security lock on the inside. The contractor for these locks has been the Chubb Locks company for many years. They are five-lever locks and each one can exhibit more than 6,500 combinations. There is no skeleton key for these locks. Each post box has its own set of keys and postal workers have to carry large bunches with them when clearing the boxes.

The carcass or body of the box supports the door and cap, and may protrude substantially down below ground level. This provides security and stability to the pillar box. There is a wirework cage inside to prevent mail falling out when the door is opened, a hinged letter chute to allow mail to fall into the collecting bag or sack, and a serrated hand-guard to prevent unauthorised tampering with the mail through the aperture.

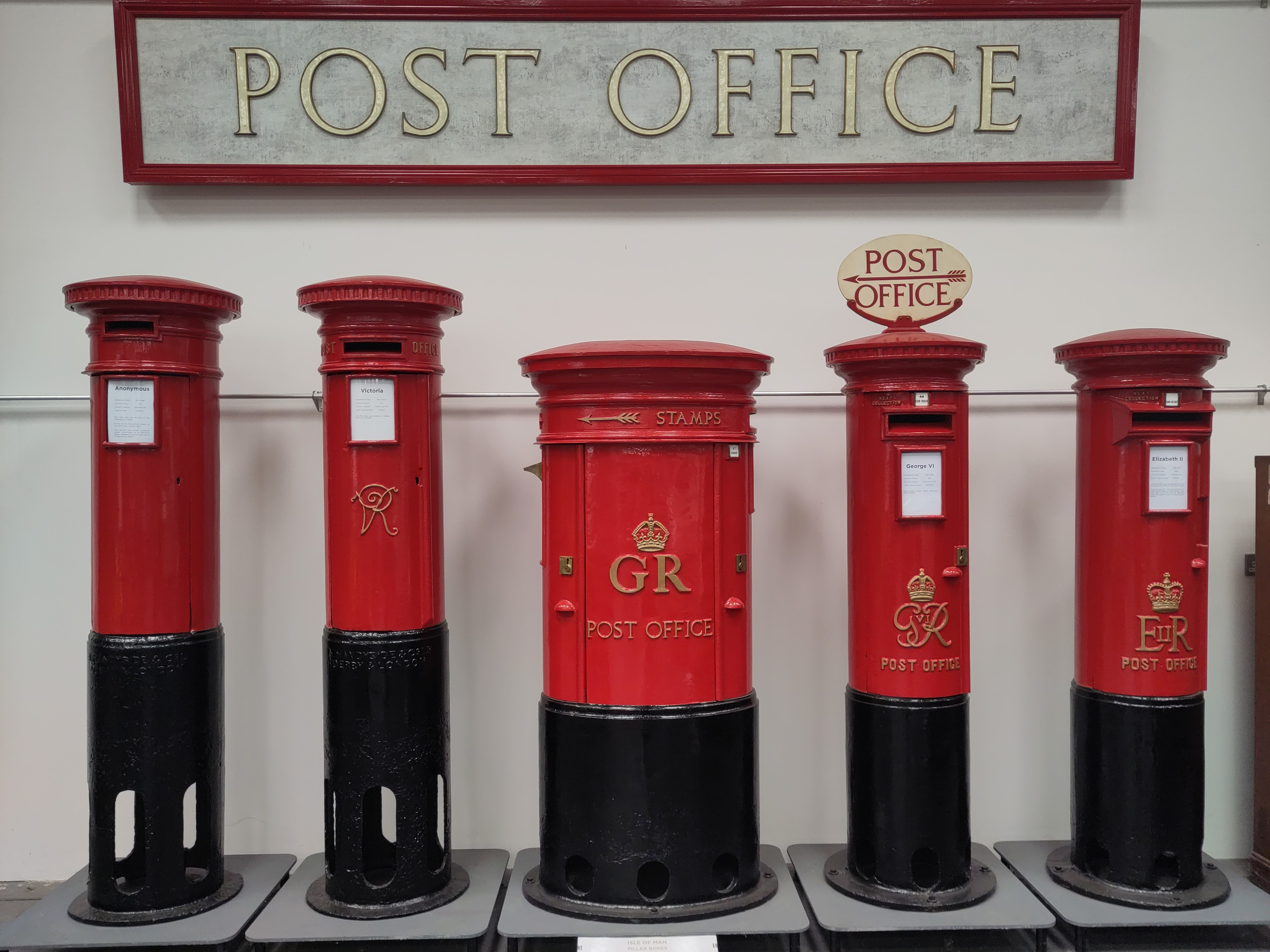
A line of 5 Red pillar boxes under a large "Post Office" sign, showing the black carcasses and how they extend below ground level

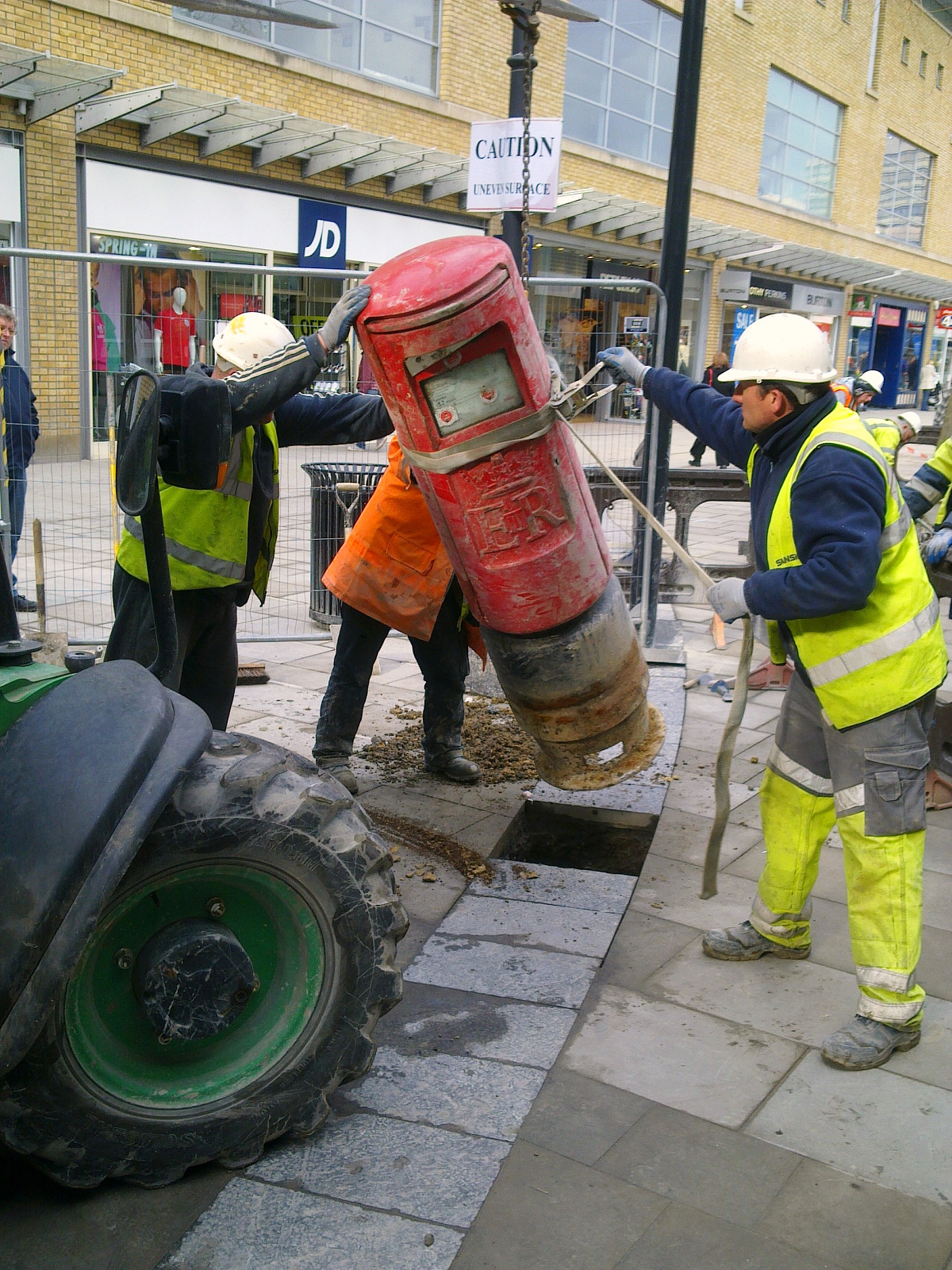
Installing a used Type K in Swindon

== History ==
=== Pre-history ===
Before the introduction of pillar boxes, in the UK, it was customary to take outgoing mail to the nearest letter-receiving house or post office. Such houses were usually coaching inns or turnpike houses where the Royal Mail coach would stop to pick up and set down mails and passengers. People took their letters, in person, to the receiver, or postmaster, purchased a stamp (after 1840) and handed over the letter.

=== Channel Islands problem ===
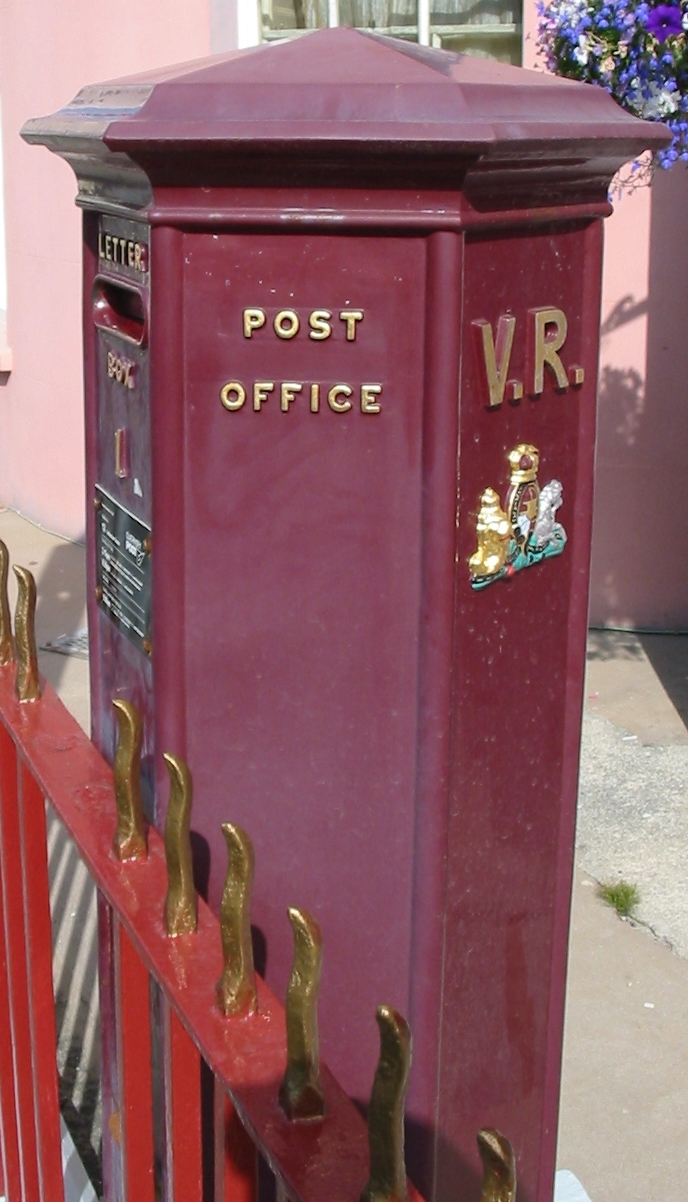
This VR box in Guernsey is the oldest box in use in the British Isles

The advent of the British wayside letter box can be traced to Sir Rowland Hill, Secretary of the Post Office, and novelist Anthony Trollope, his Surveyor for the Western District. Hill sent Trollope to the Channel Islands to ascertain what could be done about the problem of collecting the mail on a pair of islands. The problems identified in the Channel Islands were caused by the irregular sailing times of the Royal Mail packet boats serving the islands due to weather and tides.

Trollope subsequently arrived in Jersey in the early Spring of 1852 and proceeded to survey both islands. His recommendation back to Hill was to employ a device he may have seen in use in Paris: a "letter-receiving pillar". It was to be made of cast iron, about 1.5 metres high, octagonal in design and painted olive green. Trollope estimated that four would be needed for Guernsey and five for Jersey. The foundry of Vaudin & Son in Jersey was commissioned to produce them and the first four were erected in David Place, New Street, Cheapside and St Clement's Road in Saint Helier and brought into public use on 23 November 1852. Guernsey received its first three pillar boxes on 8 February 1853.

They were an instant success, despite some obvious problems with rainwater ingress. One Vaudin box still stands in Union Street, Saint Peter Port, Guernsey whilst another is in the British Postal Museum & Archive collection in London.

=== First mainland and Isle of Wight boxes ===
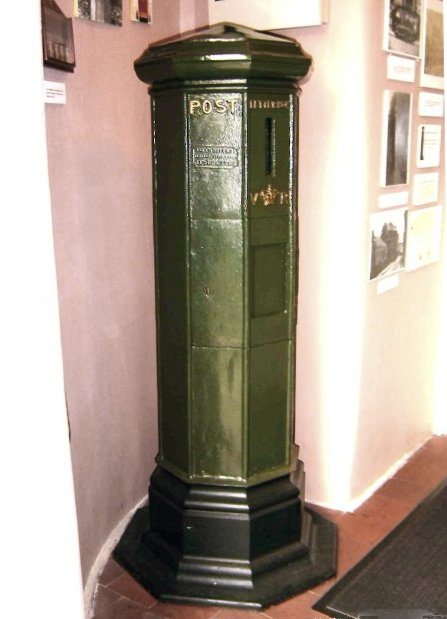
Early British John Butt box (type PB1/1) in Haverfordwest Town Museum

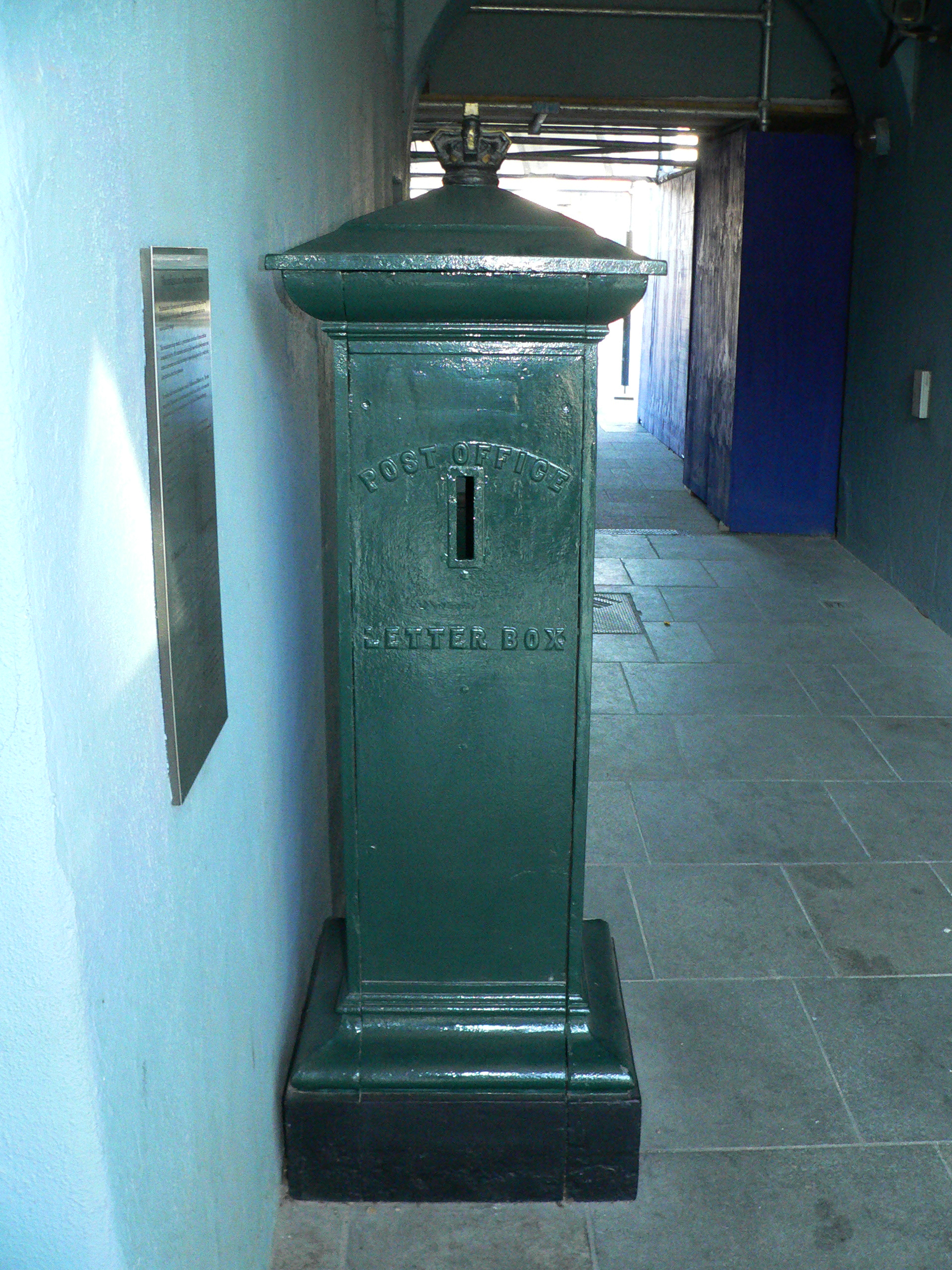
Preserved "Ashworth" early Irish pillar box at the National Museum of Ireland, Dublin

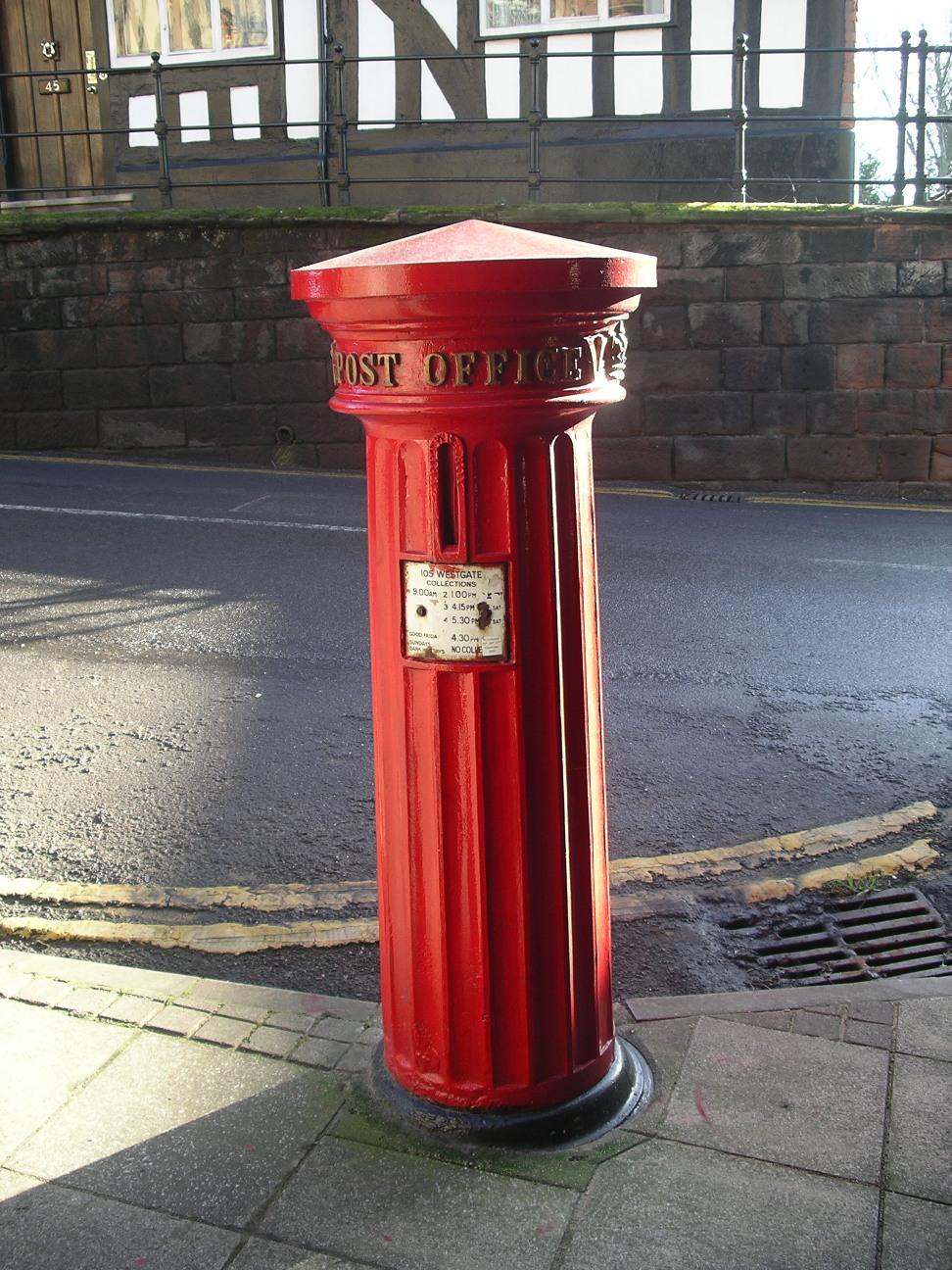
1856 type PB1/viii at the West Gate, Warwick, Warwickshire, England

The very first boxes erected in Great Britain and Ireland are not recorded, but the designs varied from area to area, as each district surveyor issued their own specifications and tendered to their own chosen foundries. The earliest ones were essentially experimental, including octagonal pillars or fluted columns, vertical slits instead of horizontal ones, and other unusual features.

The Post Office archives record that the first box in mainland Britain was erected in Botchergate, Carlisle, in 1853. This fact is commemorated today with a replica Penfold box, located outside the Old Town Hall in Carlisle city centre. The first six in London were installed on 11 April 1855. The earliest surviving British designs are four Butt boxes made in Gloucester for the Western Area. These are at Barnes Cross, near Sherborne, Dorset, inside the former Royal Naval Hospital, Stonehouse, Plymouth, in the Haverfordwest town museum (formerly at Merlin's Bridge) and in the British Postal Museum & Archive store at Debden (formerly at Ventnor railway station, Isle of Wight). All date from 1853 to 1859, with Barnes Cross being one of the later batch. The oldest pillar boxes still in use by the Royal Mail are at Framlingham in Suffolk; this pair were founded by Andrew Handyside and Company of Derby in 1856 and are at Double Street and College Road. A third octagonal pillar of this type was at Gosberton in Lincolnshire and is now in the Museum of Lincolnshire Life in Lincoln. 1856 also saw various designs introduced in Scotland and the Midlands. The postbox believed to be the oldest in Scotland, is a wall box which sits on the front of the Golspie Inn (formerly the Sutherland Arms Hotel); it carries the royal cypher of Queen Victoria and dates back to 1861.

=== Design problems ===
The first design for London, by Grissel & Son of Hoxton Ironworks was rather stubby and rectangular, although surmounted by a decorative ball. Erected in 1855, they were replaced because people complained that they were ugly. One survived and was earmarked for preservation in the early part of the 20th century. It was stored in a contractor's yard in London which was subject to a direct hit from a German bomb during the Blitz, thus destroying forever some important boxes. A photograph of this Grissel box together with a Giant Fluted box and a Penfold in the contractor's yard appeared in The Letter Box by Jean Young Farrugia.

=== Moving towards a standard design ===
Standardisation of sorts came in 1857 with the deliberations of the Committee for Science & Art of the House of Lords. The committee designed a very ornate box festooned with Grecian-style decoration but, in a major oversight, devoid of any posting aperture, which meant they were hewn out of the cast iron locally, destroying the aesthetic of the box. Fifty were made for London and the big cities and three survive. One is in Salford Museum, Greater Manchester and the other two are at the BPMA in London. A similar, much-simplified version has survived painted green by An Post at the Cork Kent railway station, Ireland. Also to be found only in Ireland is one of the early boxes, now at the An Post exhibit on the history of the Irish postal service in the General Post Office, O'Connell Street, Dublin. It is the sole surviving "Ashworth" box of 1855 for the Northern District, that included all of the island of Ireland.

Prior to 1859 there was no standard colour, although there is evidence that the lettering and royal cypher were sometimes picked out in gold. In 1859, a bronze green colour became standard until 1874. Initially, it was thought that the green colour would be unobtrusive. Too unobtrusive, as it turned out – people kept walking into them. Red became the standard colour in 1874, although ten more years elapsed before every box in the UK had been repainted.

=== First National Standard boxes ===
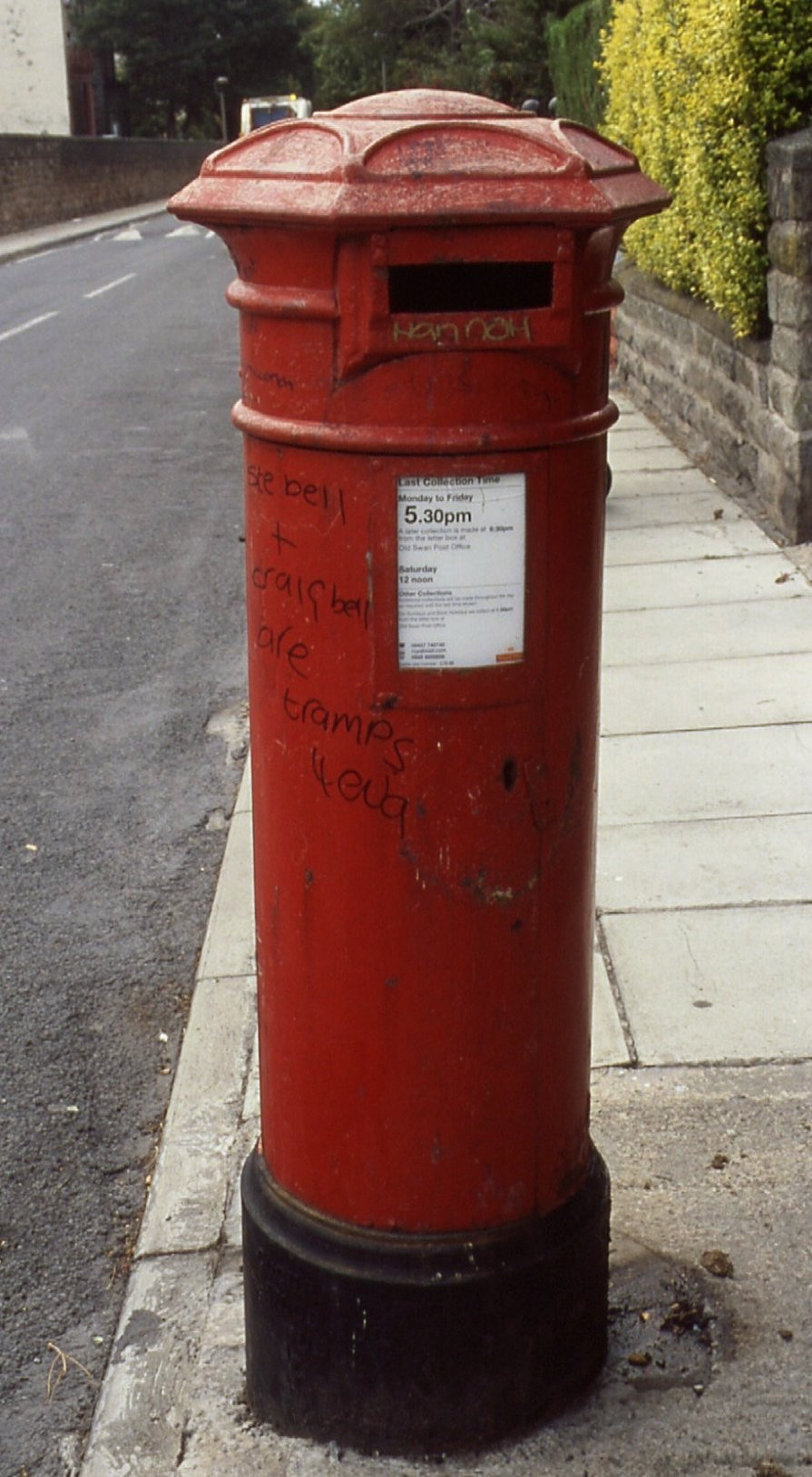
First National Standard (small size), formerly at Sandown Rd, Liverpool

The first real standard design came in 1859 with the First National Standard box. These were also cast in two sizes for the first time to allow for heavier usage in big metropolitan areas. A number have survived across the UK, including Aberdeen, Brighton, Stoke, Worthing, London, World's End Hambledon, Bristol, Congresbury, and Newport, Isle of Wight. Similar boxes have also survived in Mauritius.

In the busy city of Liverpool, even these boxes could not provide the capacity and security required, so a special design was commissioned from the foundry of Cochrane Grove & Co of Dudley. Known as "Liverpool Specials", three survive from a batch of six. Two of these are in Liverpool and the other is in the BPMA collection in London. Cochrane became the foundry that made all the Penfold boxes from 1866 to 1879.

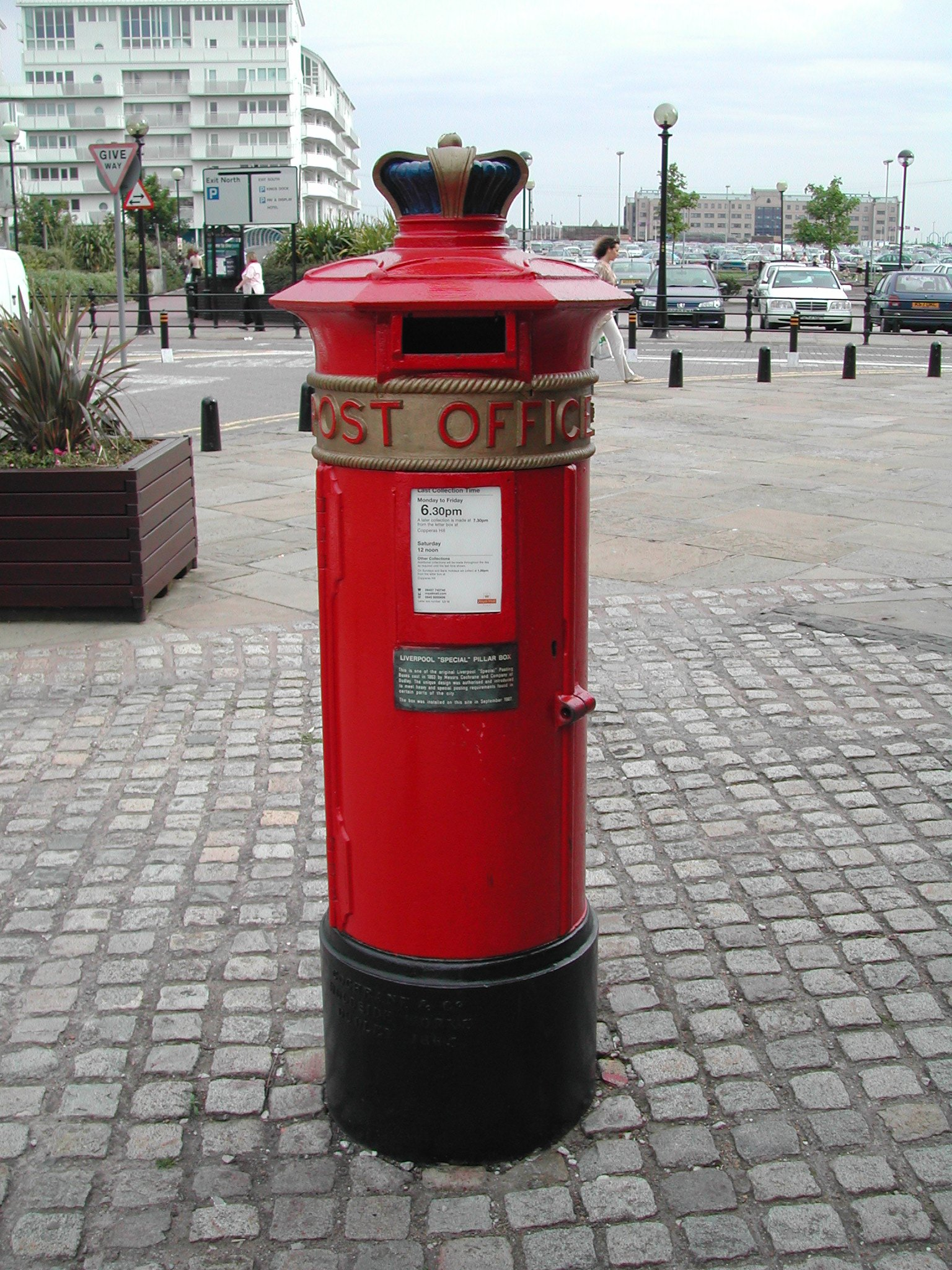
"Liverpool Special" at Albert Dock

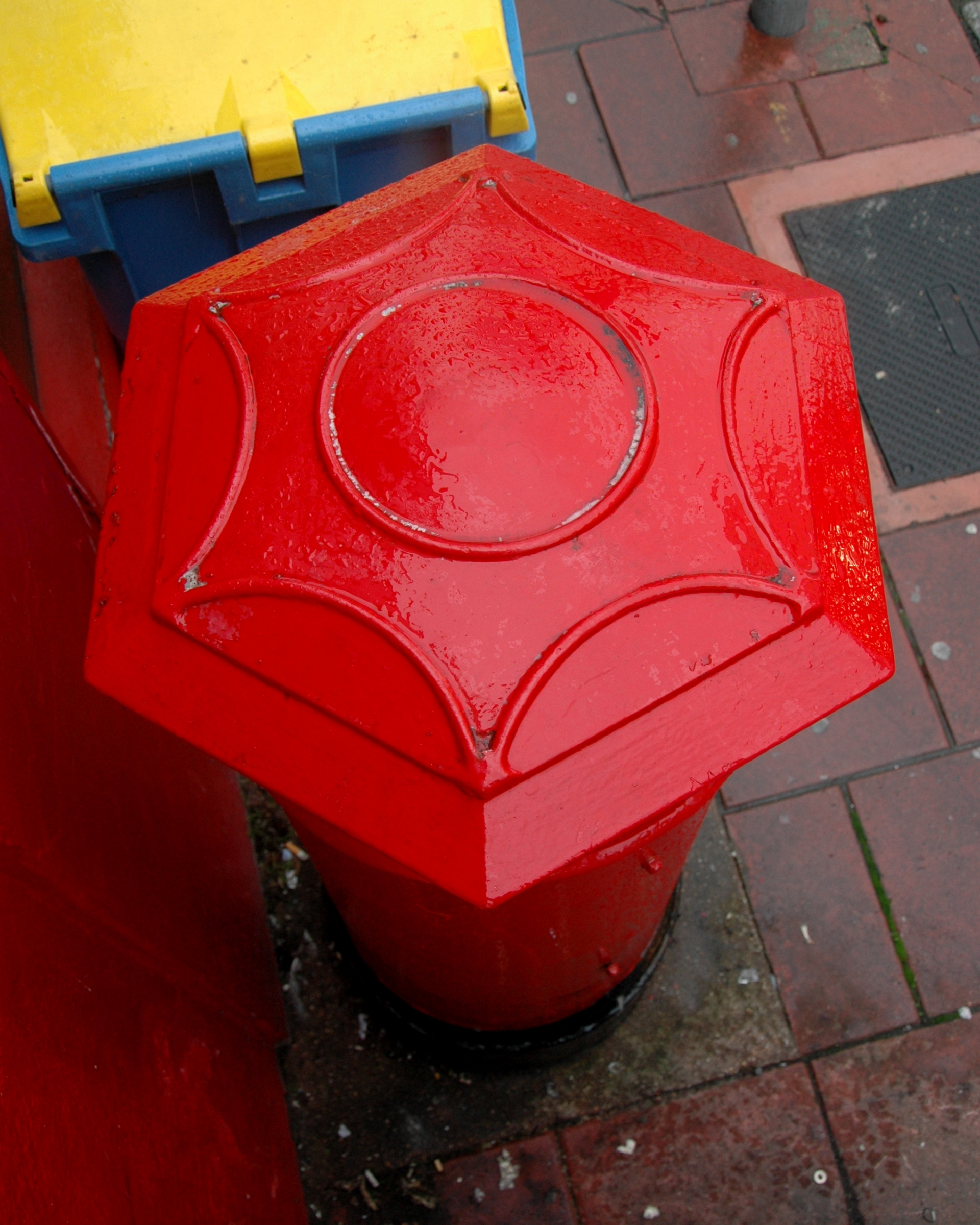
Top of First National Standard in Montpelier Road, Brighton

=== Penfolds ===
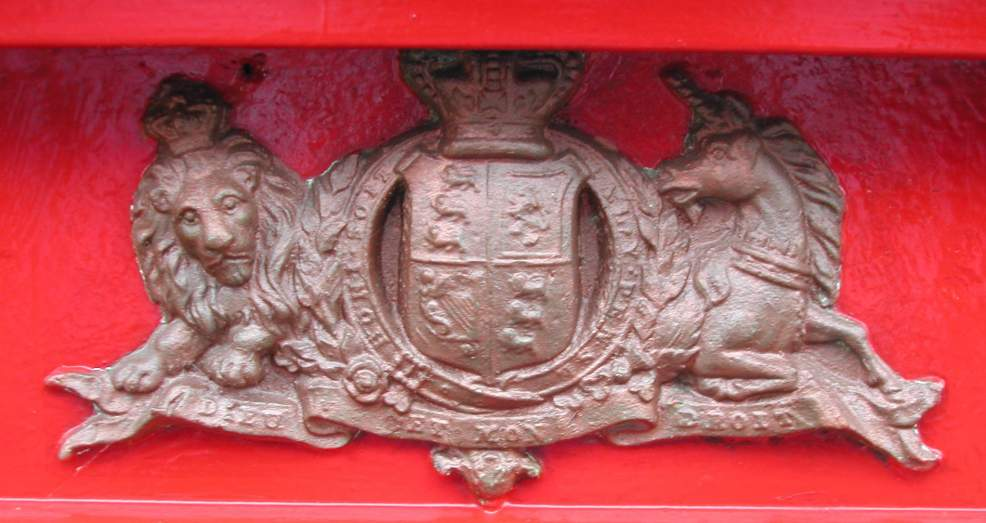
Queen Victoria coat of arms details from Penfold at the former Neyland railway station, Wales.

The most famous of the early designs is that named after the architect who designed it, John Penfold. Penfold boxes come in three sizes and altogether there are nine different types. They are very widespread, with the biggest accumulations in London and Cheltenham. Others are spread across England, Ireland, India (including locally made copies), British Guyana, Australia and New Zealand. An export order from the postal service of the Republic of Uruguay resulted in nine boxes of the Penfold design being exported there in 1879, of which six are believed extant, including one in the philatelic department of the central Post Office in Montevideo. In 1993 the Correo Uruguayo commemorated Penfold post boxes with a set of stamps of various denominations.

There are no original Penfolds in Scotland, but 1989-built replicas have been erected in these areas, as well as other deserving sites where they are suitable. The first replica Penfold was erected at Tower Bridge, in London, on the south embankment and carries a commemorative plaque. Genuine Penfolds can be seen at the British Postal Museum & Archive Museum Store in Debden, Essex, The Farm Museum in Normanby by Scunthorpe, the National Railway Museum at York, Beamish, Meyrick Road and Grove Road (East Cliff), Bournemouth, Open Air Museum, the Black Country Museum, Crich National Tramway Museum, Oakham Treasures, near Bristol (see link below), Carshalton Beeches in Surrey, The Isle of Wight Postal Museum near Newport, Isle of Wight, Milestones Living History Museum in Basingstoke and outside the Town Hall in Chester. A rare large capacity original Penfold is in public use at the Pavilion Gardens in Buxton Derbyshire. The Severn Valley Railway, Blists Hill Victorian Town and the Talyllyn Railway have replica Penfolds. Penfolds, which are distinguished by their hexagonal construction and acanthus bud surmounting the cap, were originally exclusively city-based, but have now been installed rural areas as well. About 300 were made, of which 150 survive. Nearly 100 replicas, made at the end of the 1980s, have also been installed.

The New Zealand boxes are the only Penfolds to bear the cypher of King Edward VII; all others in the former British controlled territories have the cypher of Queen Victoria. Penfold boxes in Uruguay bear the national coat of arms of Uruguay and are painted either yellow or black with a yellow band. Boxes made in Madras, India for the kingdom of Travancore carry that kingdom's emblem of a stylised Turbinella pyrum seashell. The acanthus bud and leaves decoration on the top of Penfold boxes was also emulated in a design of cylindrical post boxes for New Zealand and Australia.

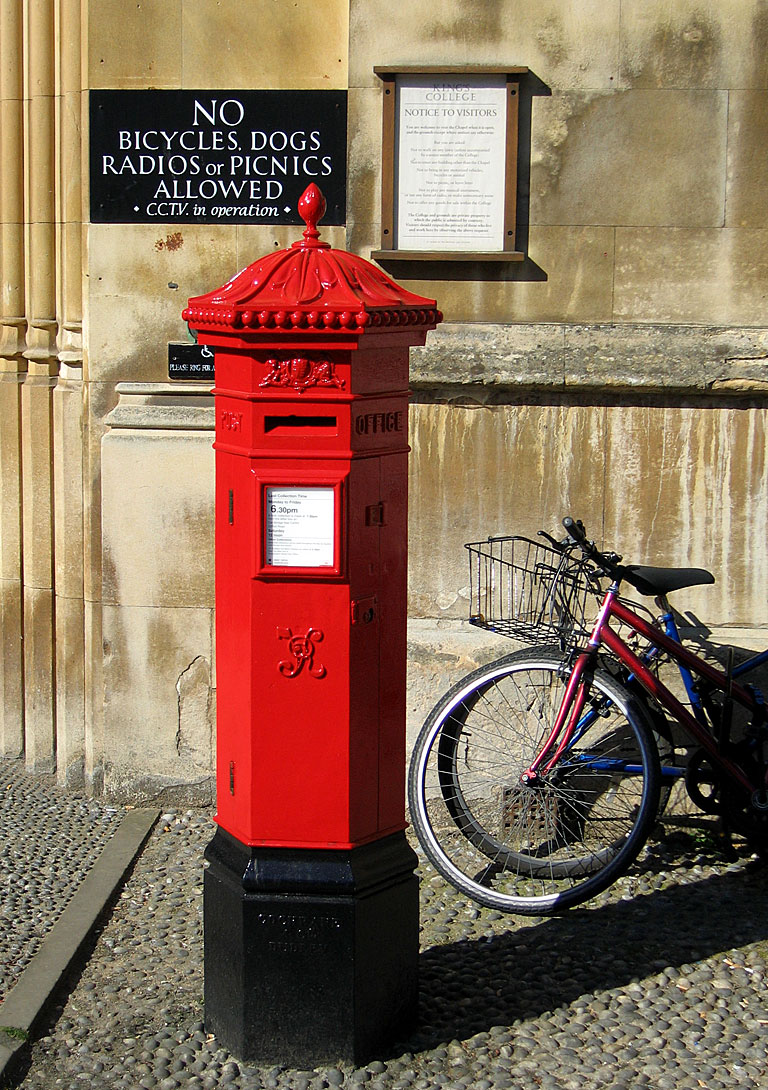
Penfold Type PB8/1 at King's Parade, Cambridge.

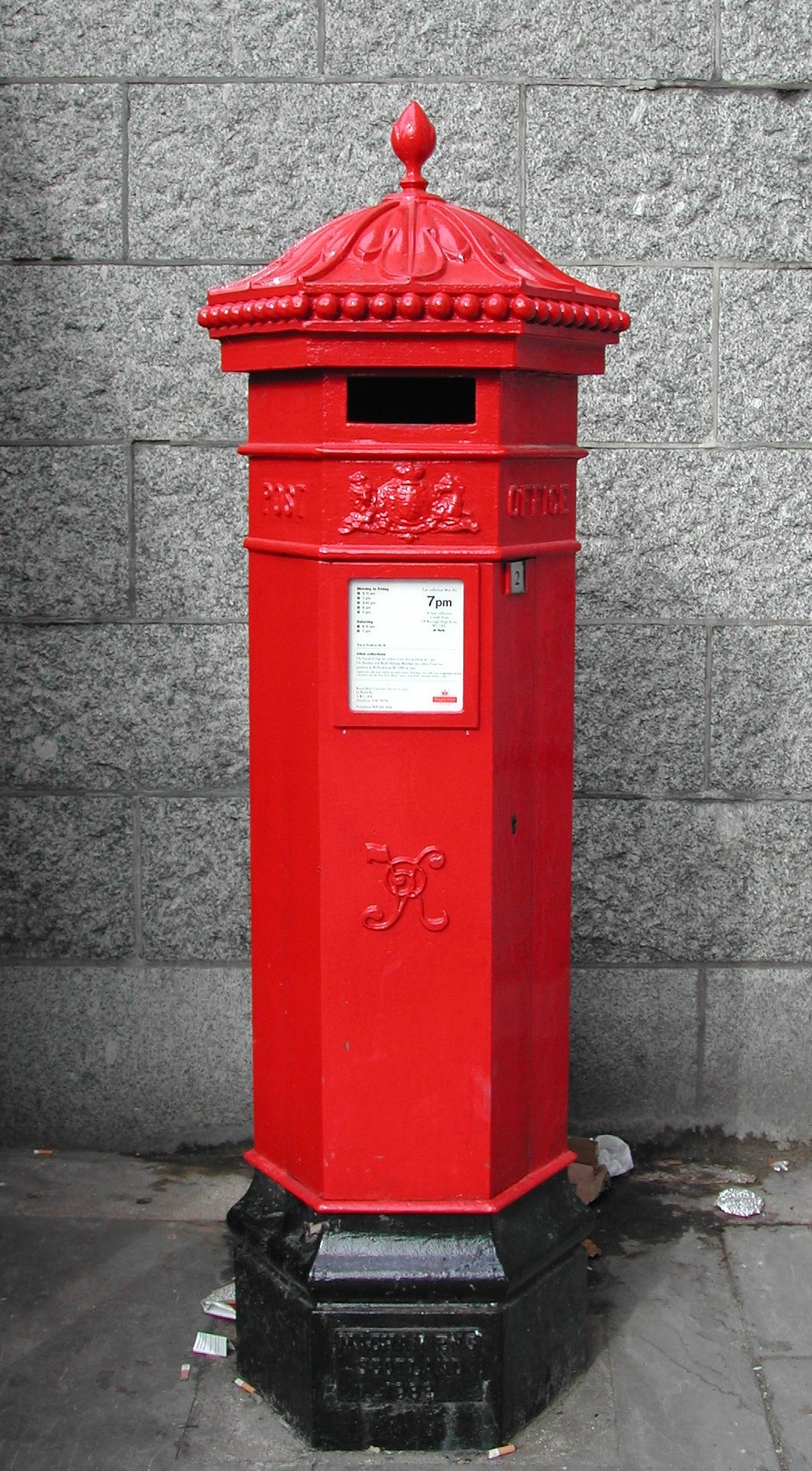
Replica Penfold, erected at Tower Bridge in 1989.

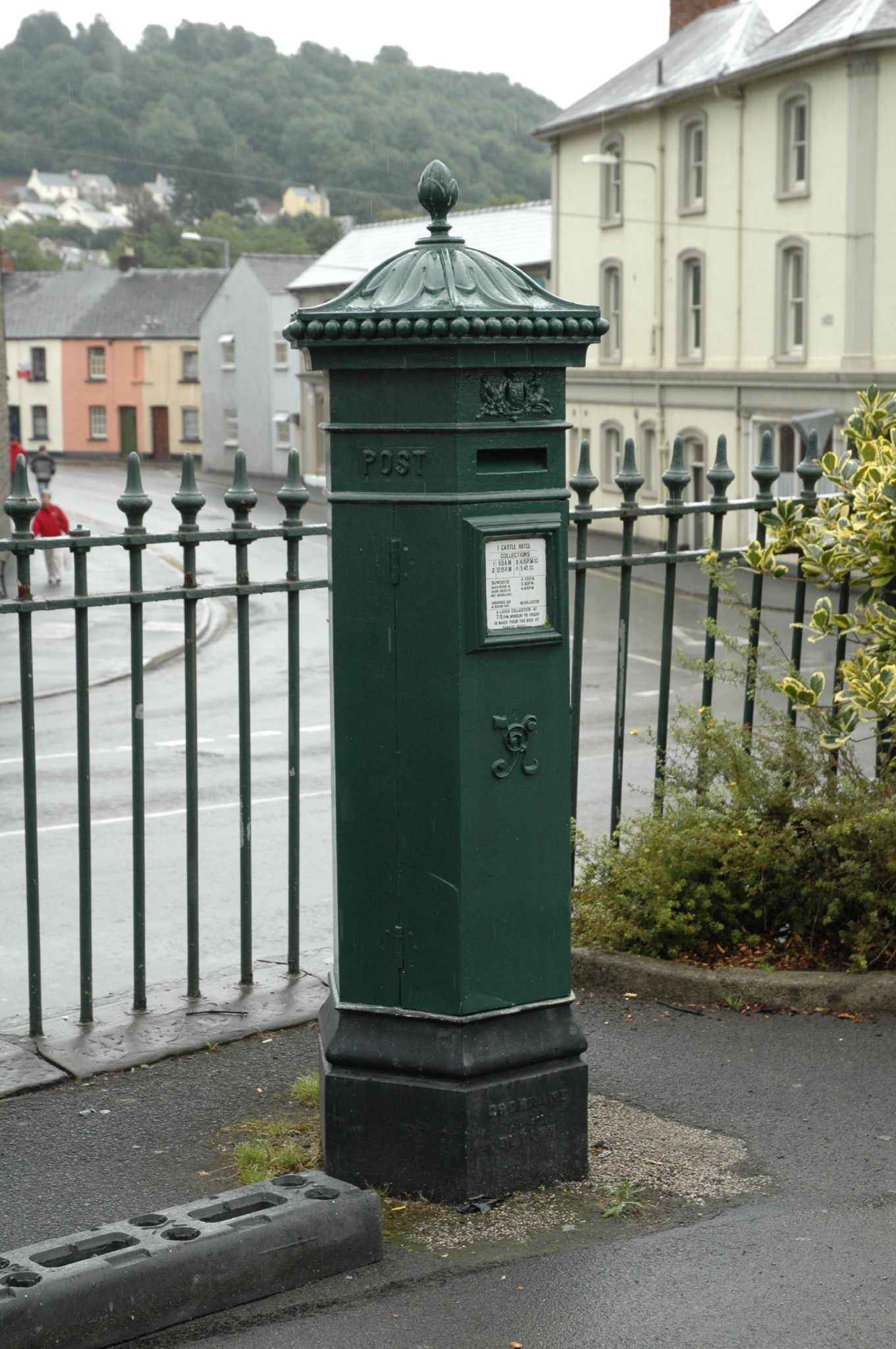
Disused green Penfold PB8/1 outside Brecon Museum, Wales.

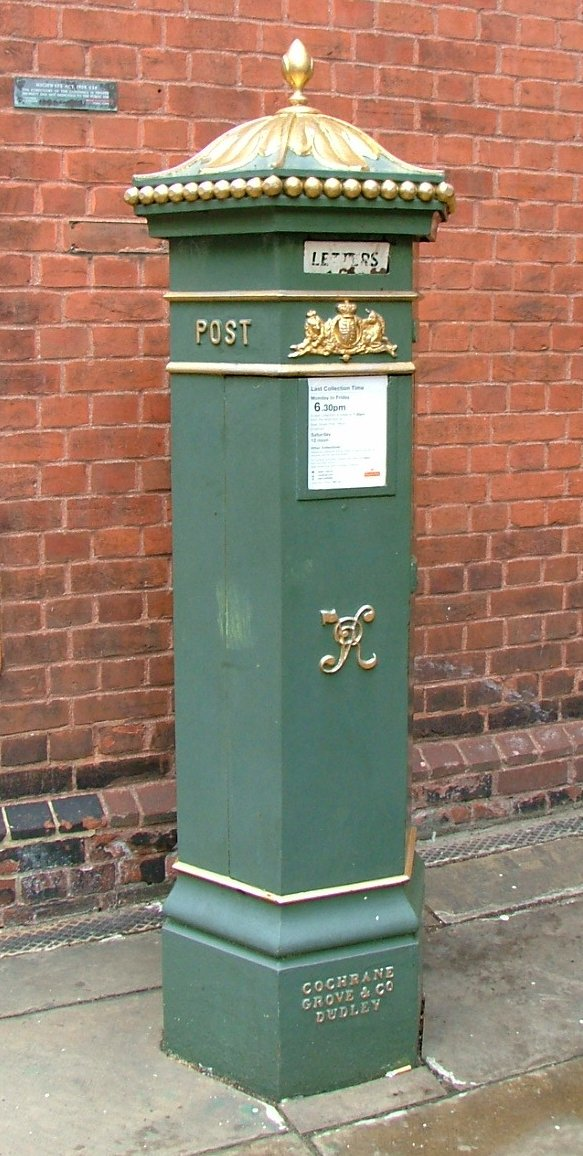
Original bronze-green livery Penfold on High St Rochester, Kent showing enamel Letters flap.

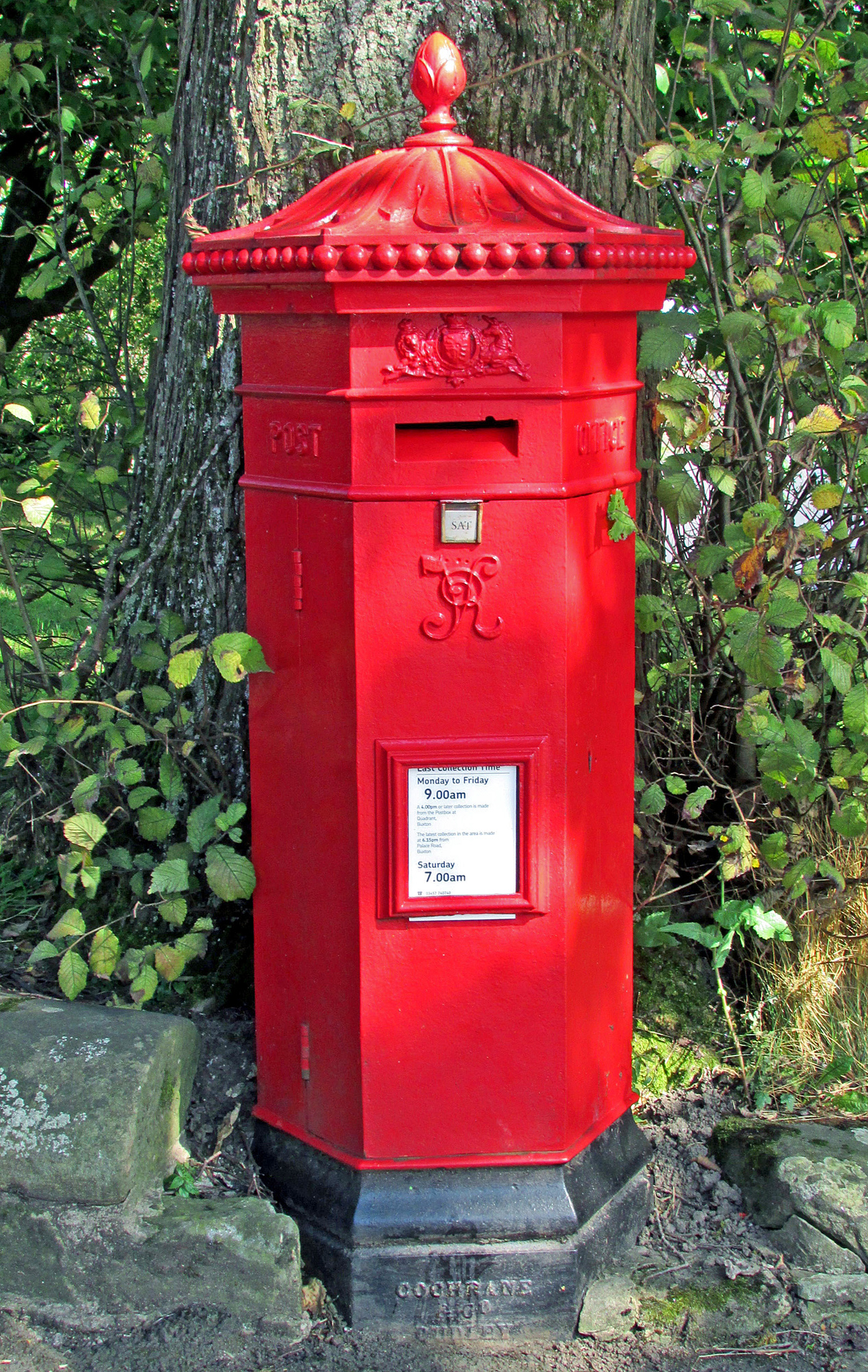
Large size Penfold box type PB9/1 in public use at Buxton, Derbyshire, England.

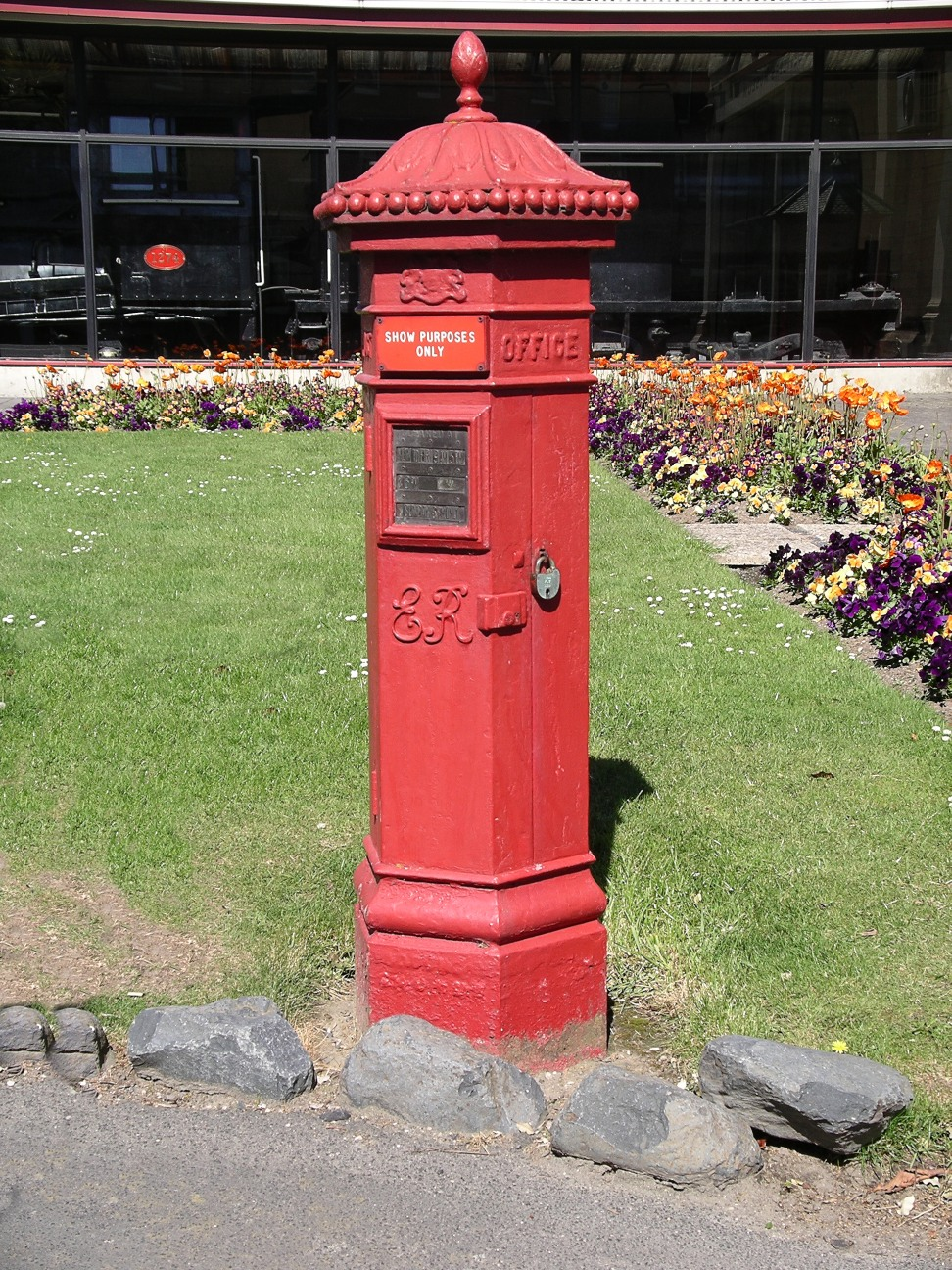
Edward VII Penfold PB8 in Dunedin, New Zealand

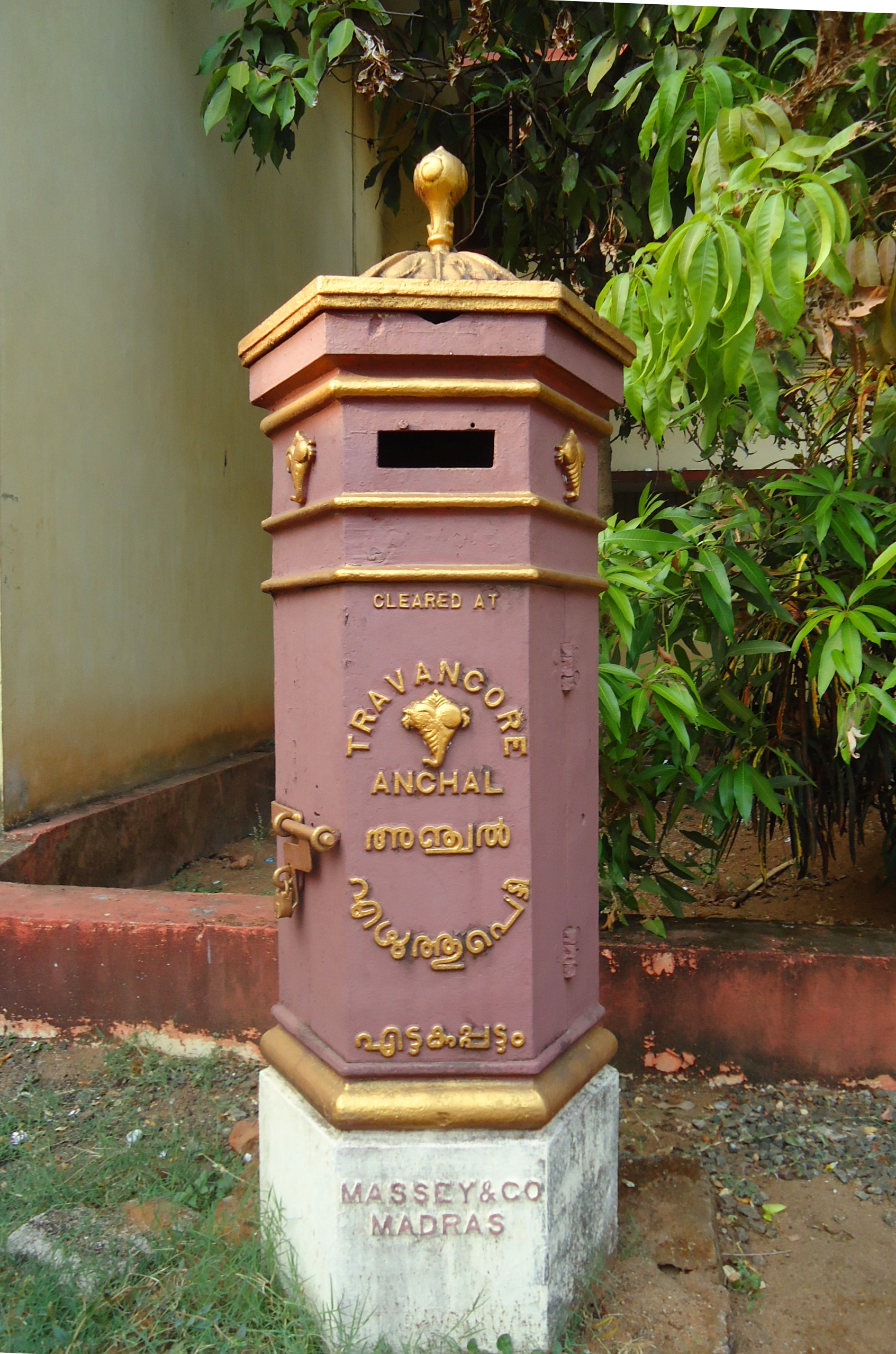
Pillar box in Perumbavoor, Kerala, made in Madras for the Indian kingdom of Travancore

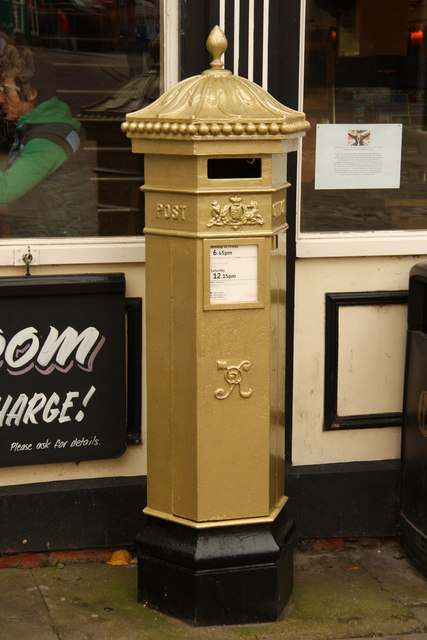
Gold postbox in Lincoln, painted in honour of the gold medal won by Sophie Wells

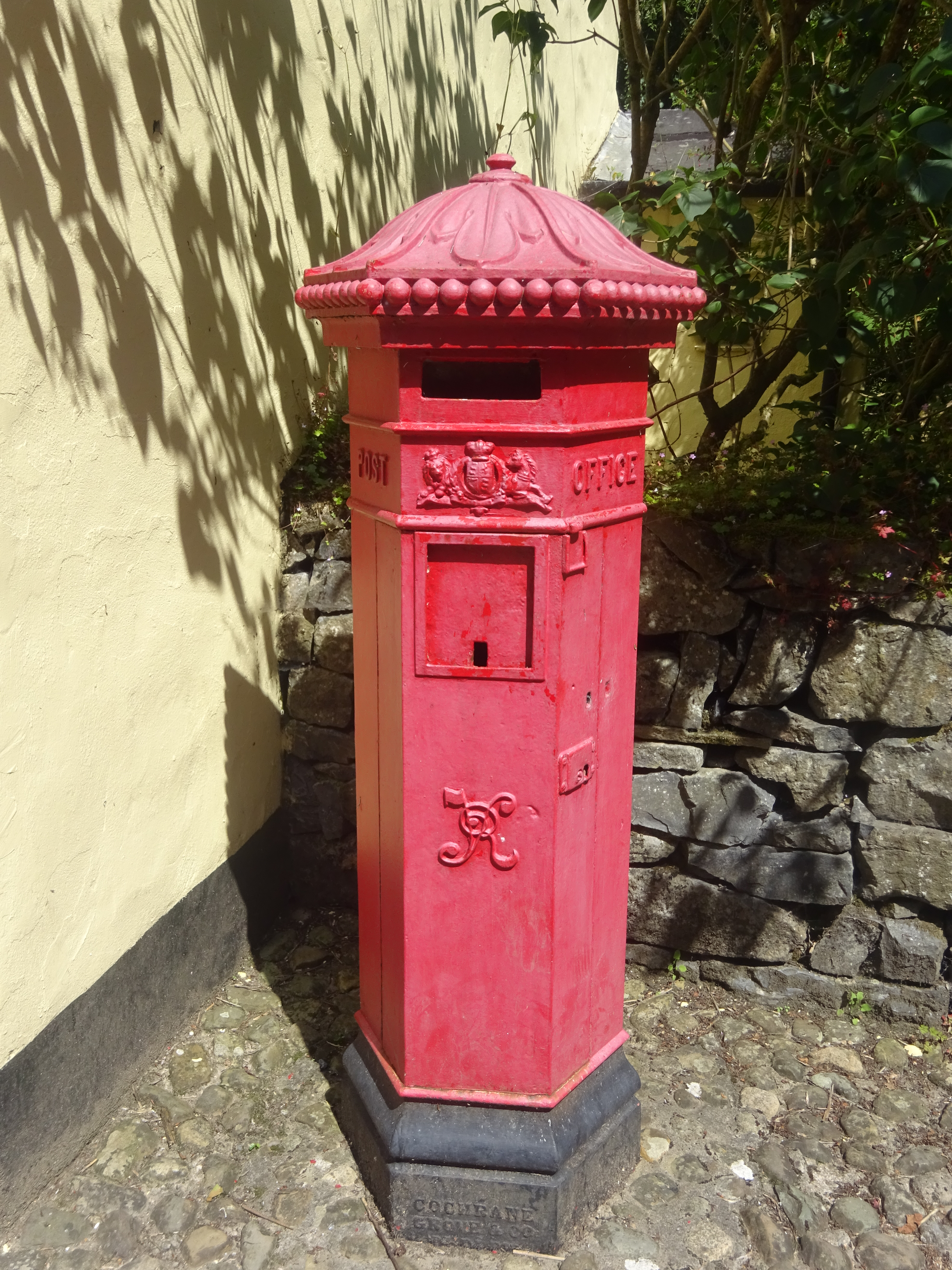
Penfold in Bunratty Folk Park, Ireland

=== Anonymous boxes ===
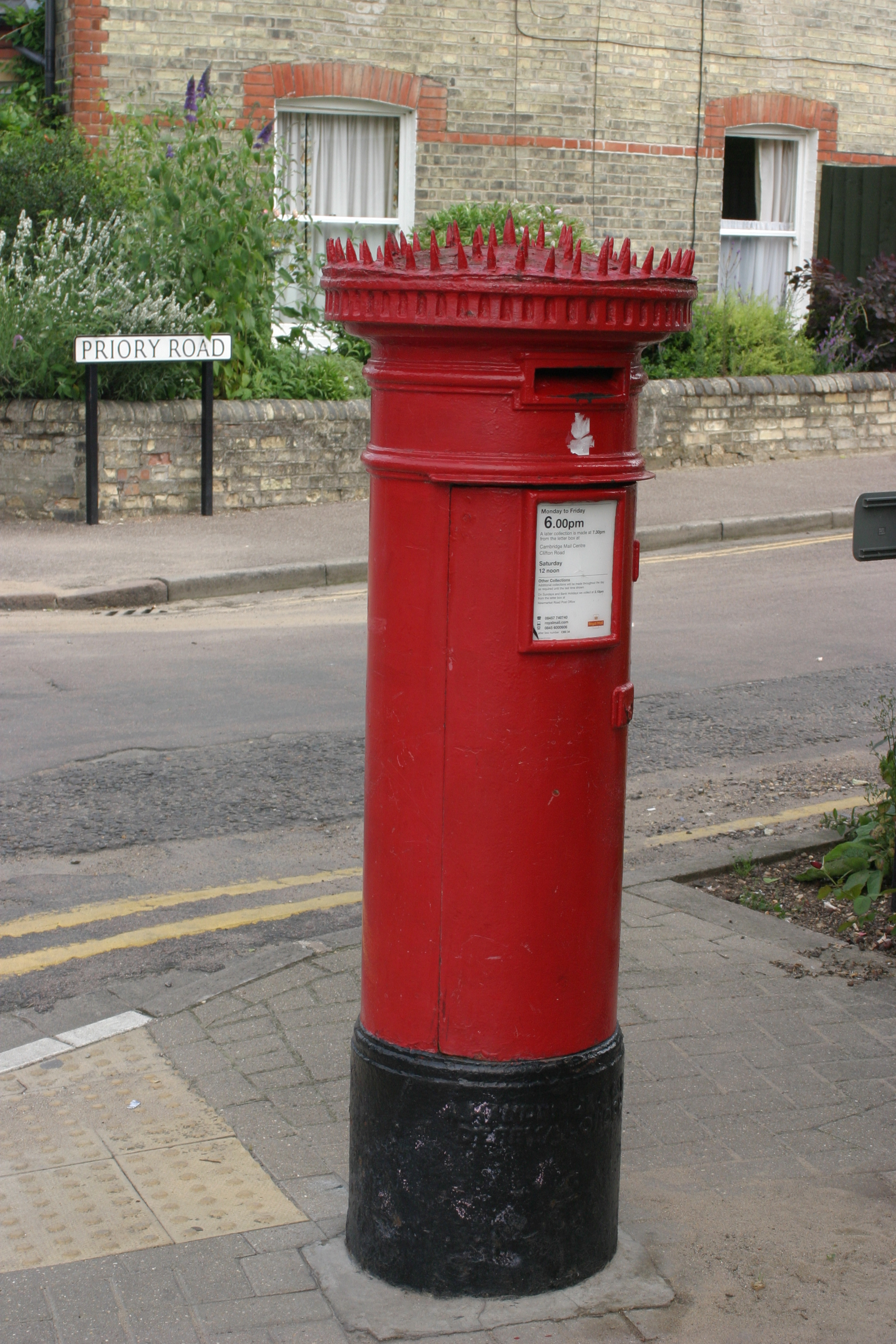
Spiked top Anonymous high aperture type VR box in Priory Road, Cambridge

A return to cylindrical boxes followed with the so-called Anonymous boxes of 1879. Andrew Handyside of Derby was the foundry, but omitted the royal cypher and the words "Post Office" leading to the Anonymous sobriquet. It took 13 years before this change was reversed, even though the box had undergone a major design change during that time. This involved lowering the position of the aperture relative to the top of the box. The original "High Aperture" design was prone to mail becoming caught under the rim of the cap. This was solved by lowering the aperture so that it falls centrally between the two raised beading lines. Consequently, the second style is known as "Low Aperture".

The Portuguese post office adopted the original high-aperture design, which were made for it by Andrew Handyside & Co. Portugal later adopted its own modified design based on Types A and B. Numerous examples of each design remain in use.

=== Late 19th and early 20th century boxes ===
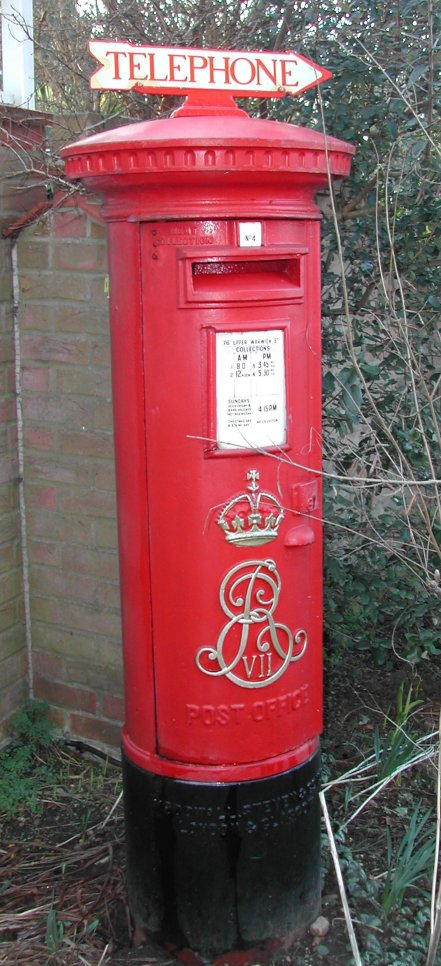
Edward VII box with aperture on door, post 1905, fitted with telephone direction sign

New post box designs were ordered in 1887 for the Golden Jubilee of Queen Victoria. For the first time there was a lamp-post mounted letter box for use in London squares, but which soon established themselves in rural areas (see lamp boxes). For the big cities, a double-aperture oval-shaped pillar (designated Type C) was introduced in 1899, initially in London, partly to increase capacity but also to allow mail to be pre-sorted by region, normally with apertures marked separately for "London" and "Country". All pillar and lamp boxes now had the distinctive Imperial cypher of Victoria Regina, whilst the wall-mounted boxes continued to show only a block cypher VR. The new pillar box design saw out the reign and remained little changed until 1905, when the basic design was refined.

The Edward VII boxes now had the posting aperture as part of the door, rather than the body of the box. That eliminated the chance for mail to get caught up in the top of the box. This basic design remains the same today, having served well throughout the reigns of George V, Edward VIII, George VI and Elizabeth II.

An experiment of 1932 was the addition of a stamp vending machine to the end of the post box. This necessitated an oval planform for the box even though it was only provided with a single posting aperture. At one end of the oval is the stamp machine and at the other is the posting aperture. The boxes have two doors; one for clearance of mail and one for emptying the cash and reloading the stamp machines. The machines were set to vend two halfpenny stamps in exchange for one old penny, the stamps being supplied in a long continuously wound roll known as a coil. Boxes were again made in two sizes, designated Type D and Type E, and carried raised lettering on the castings indicating the position of the stamp vending machine, as well as an array of small enamel plates warning users of the danger of bent coins and the need to wait for stamps to be issued before inserting more money. Several of each have survived in use in England and in the Isle of Man.

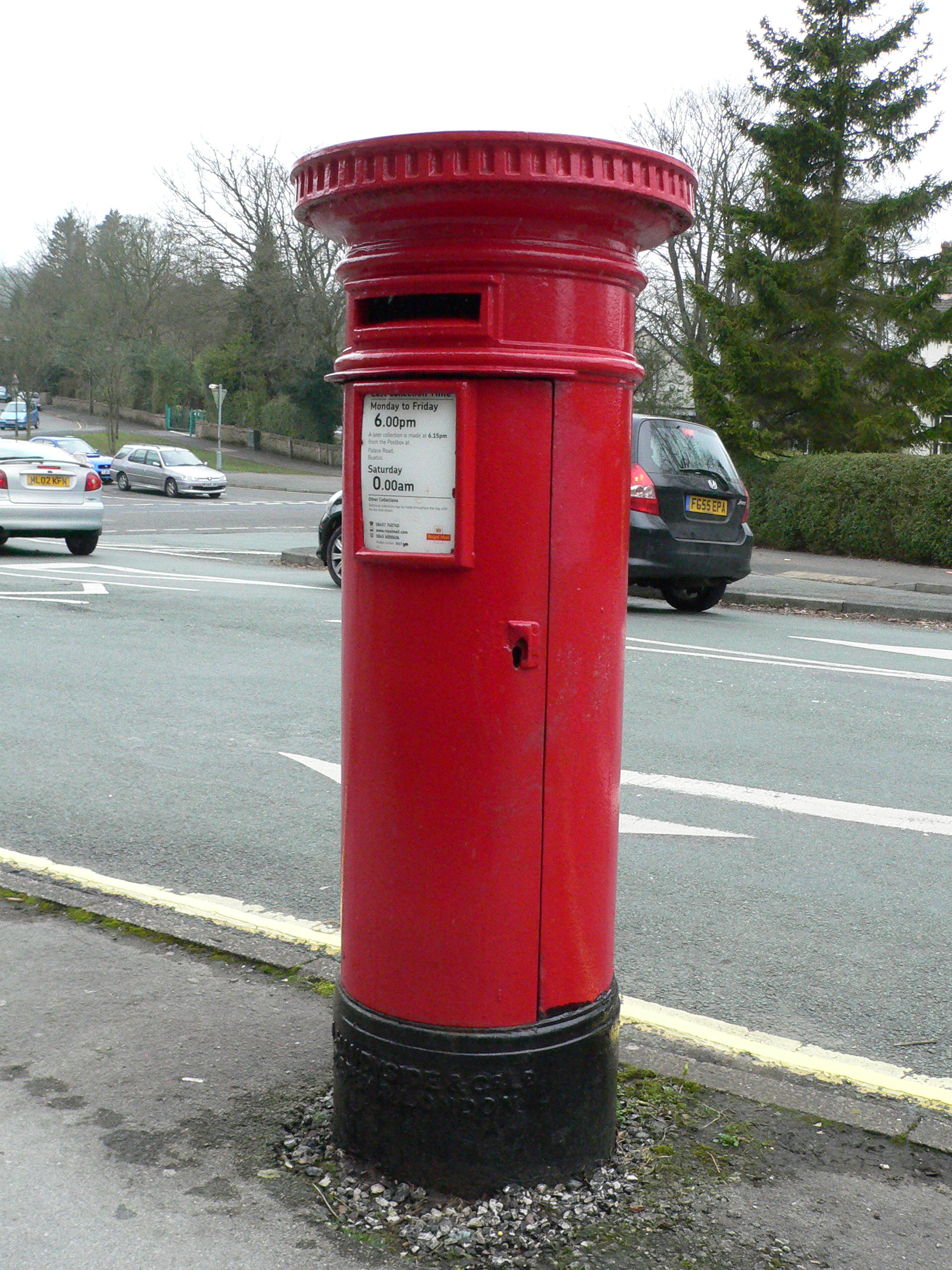
Type B 'Anonymous' pillar box in Buxton, Derbyshire, England.

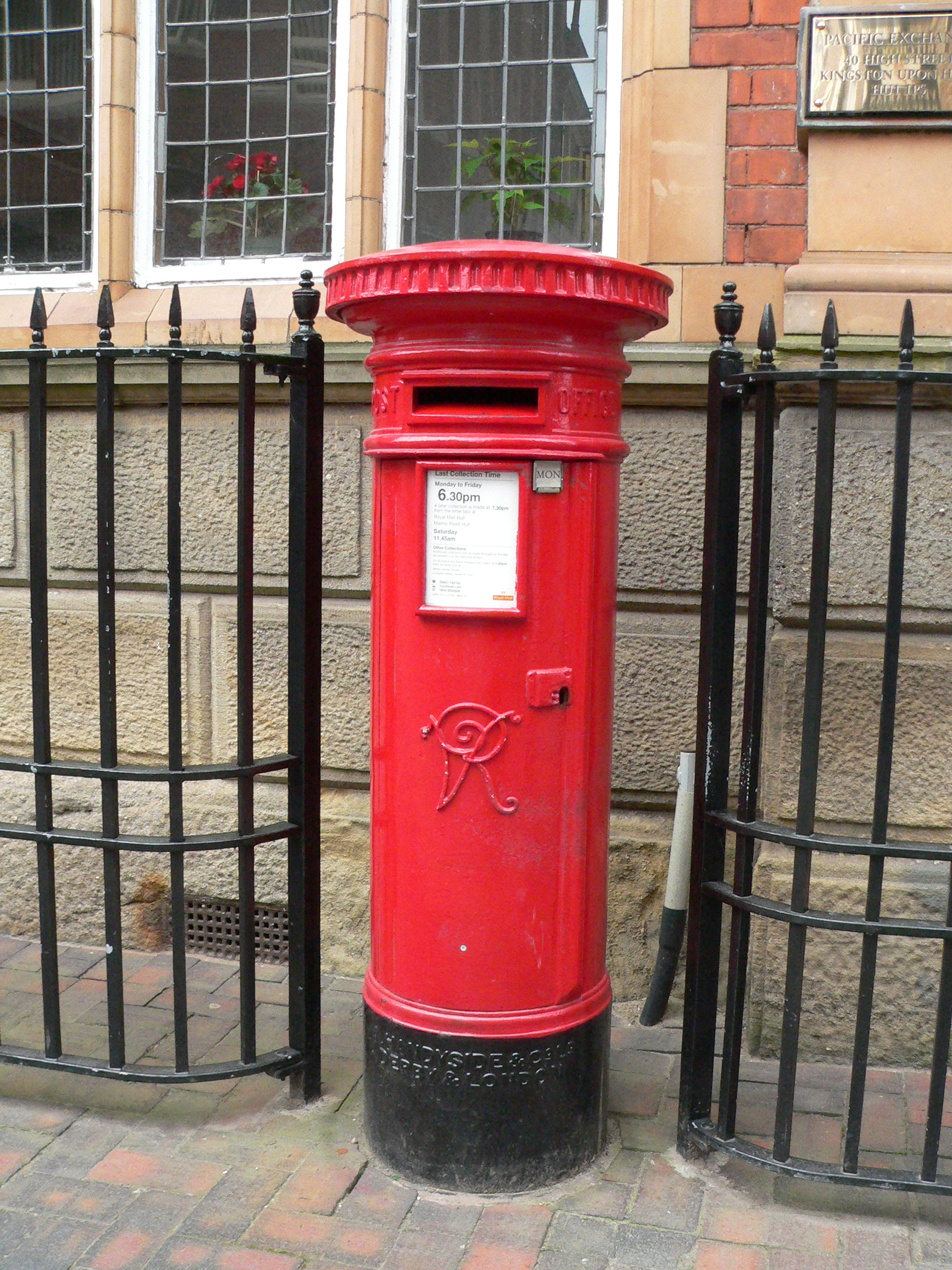
VR Type B pillar box in Hull.

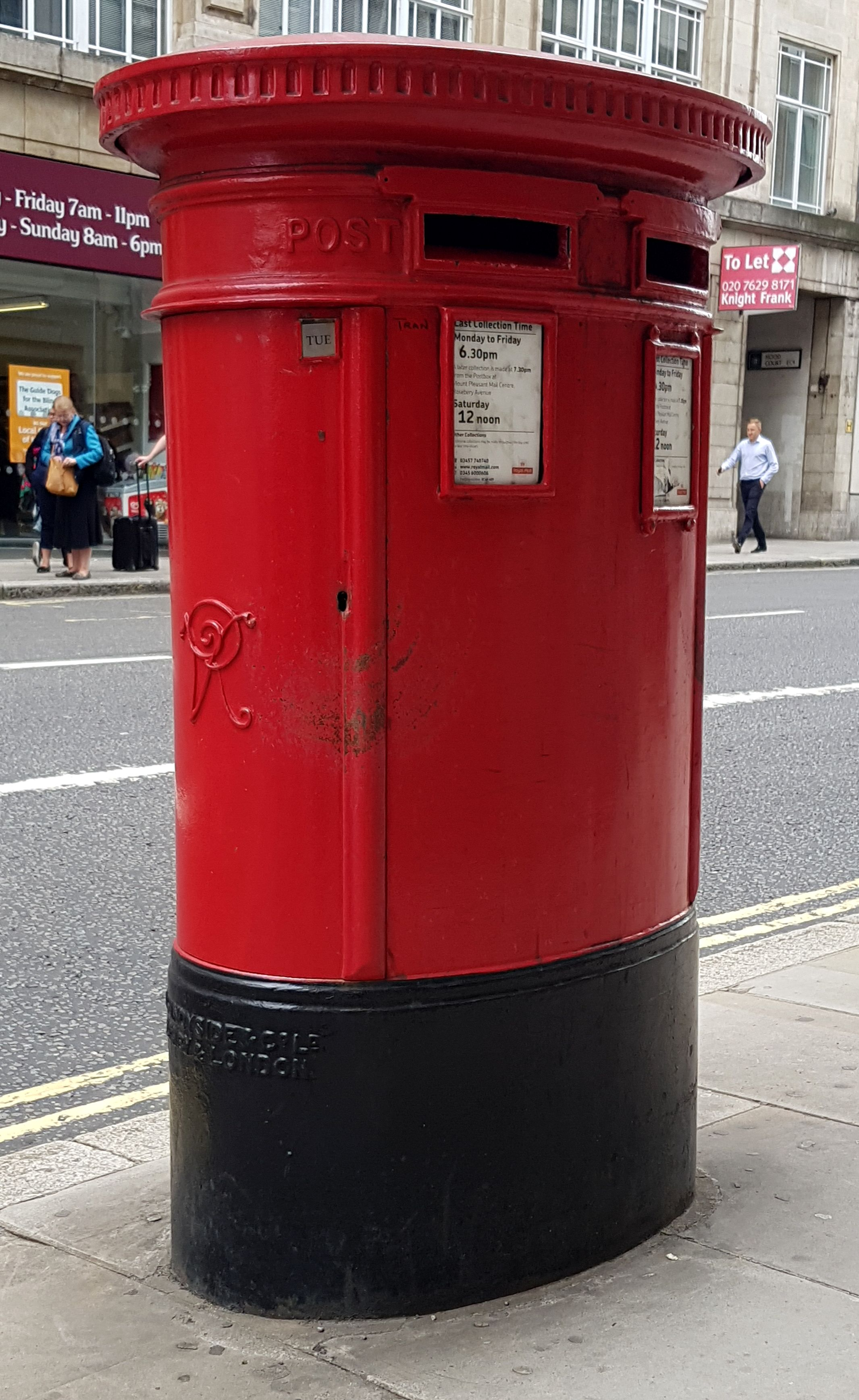
A double aperture pillar box in Fleet Street, London. This pillar box was made between 1899 and 1901, as it bears the Royal cypher 'VR' for Queen Victoria.

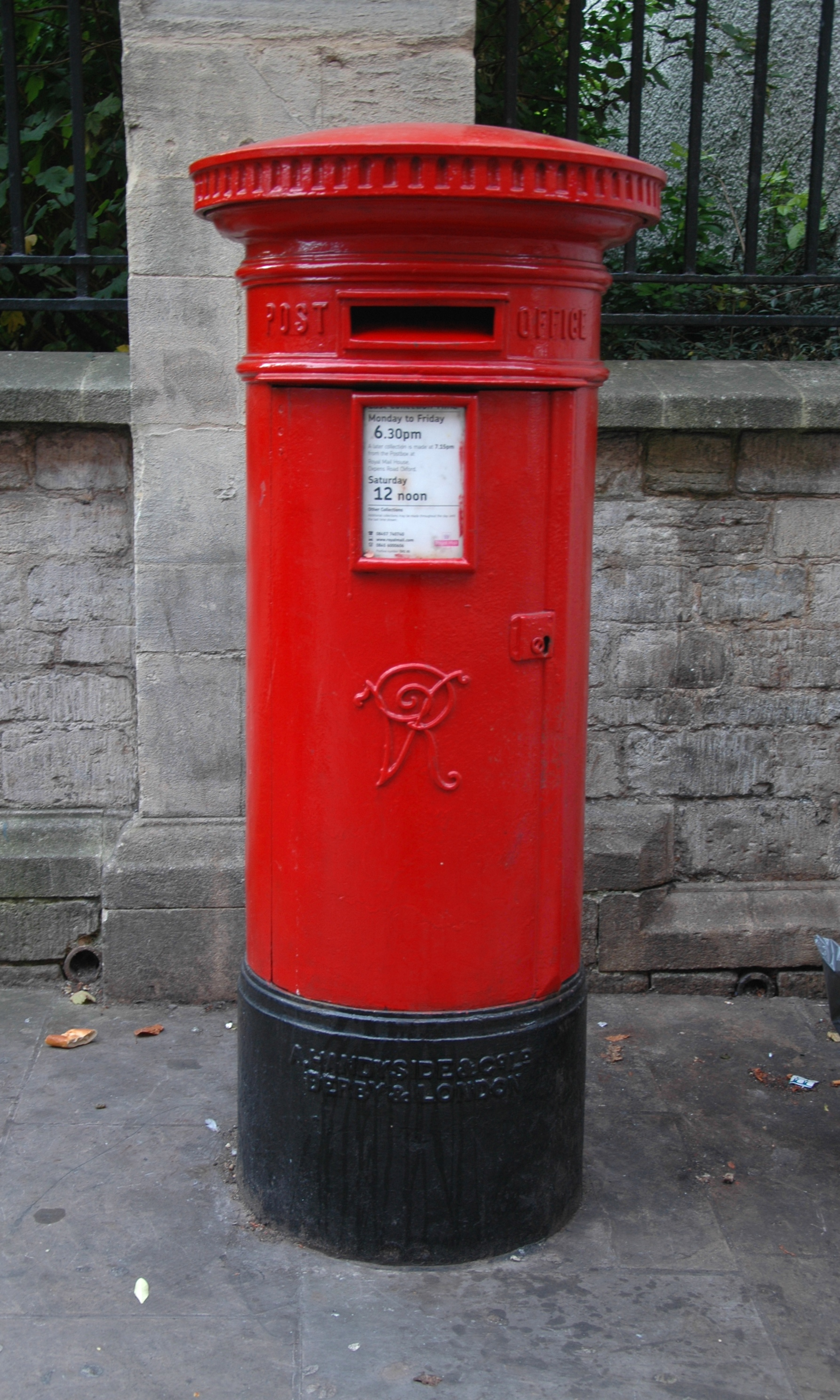
VR pillar box in Oxford, cast by A. Handyside.

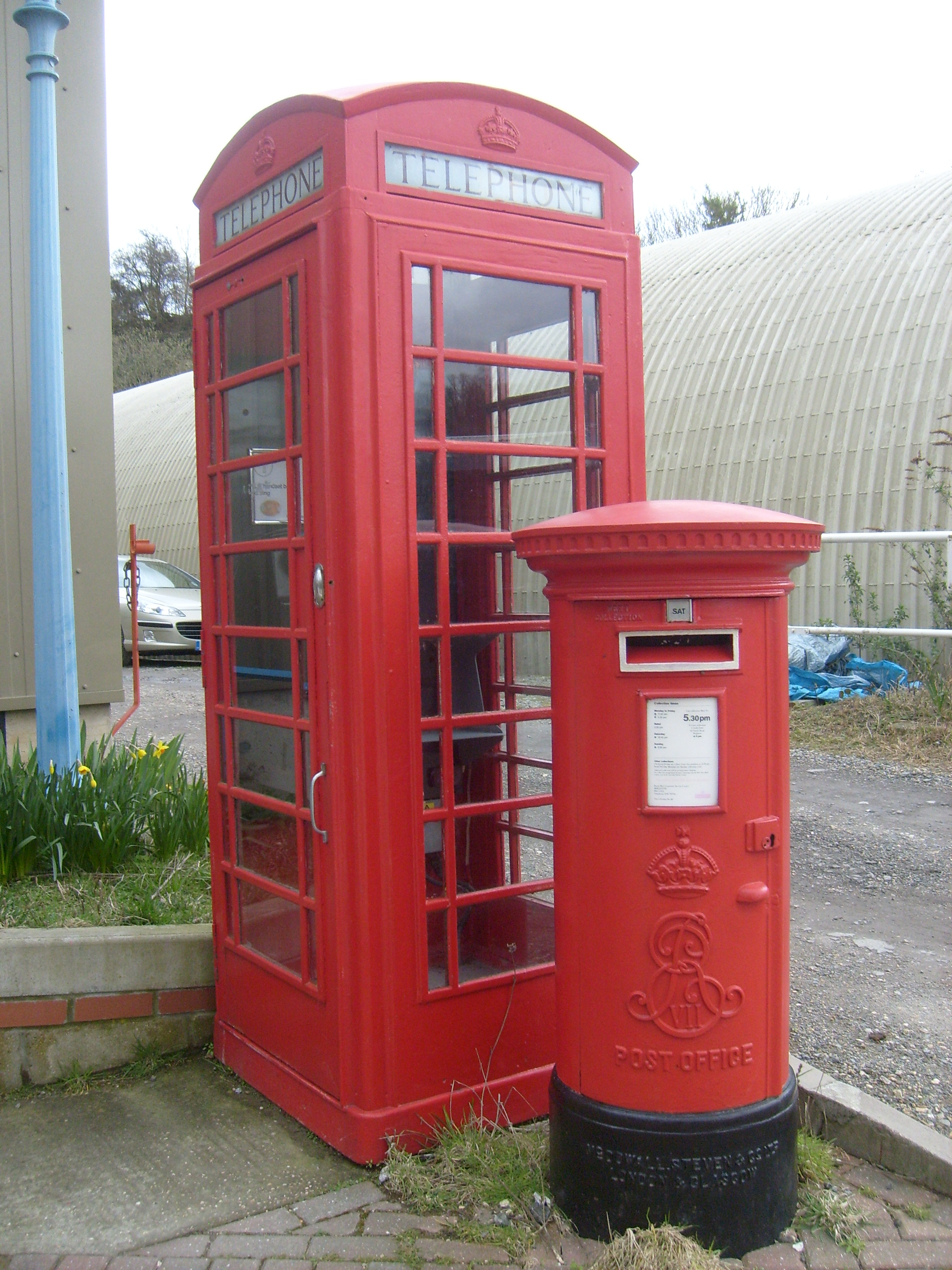
Edward VII pillar box in front of a K6 Telephone box.

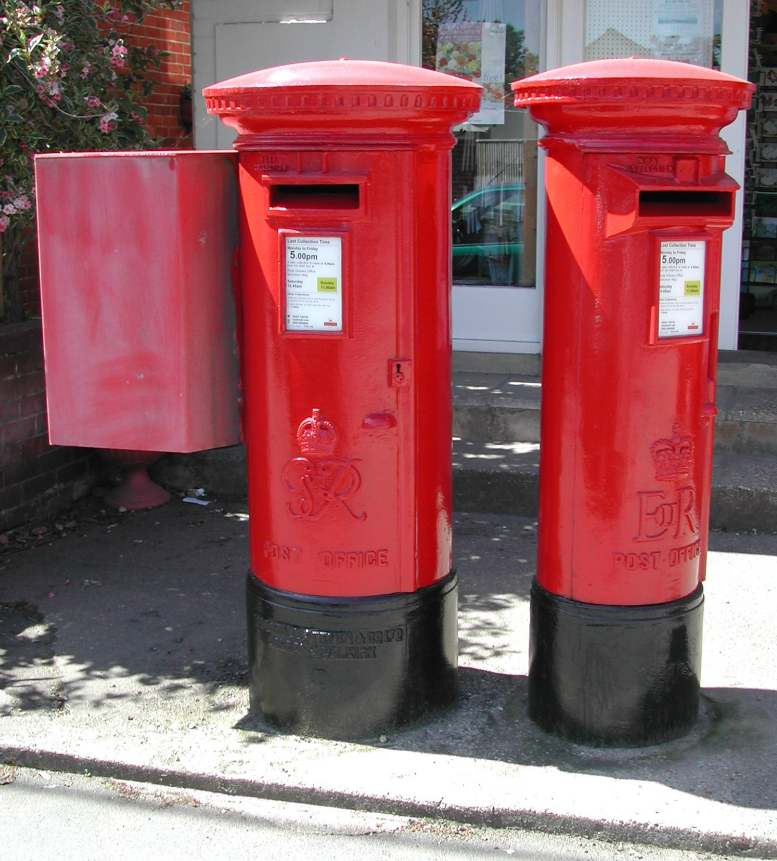
Father and daughter pair: George VI and Elizabeth II pillar boxes at Bembridge Post Office Isle of Wight. One was for local mail and the other for off-island post.

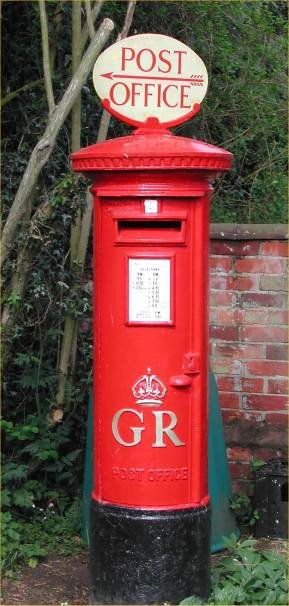
PB27/1 pillar of George V, fitted with a Post Office Direction Sign (POD) at the Colne Valley Postal History Museum, Essex

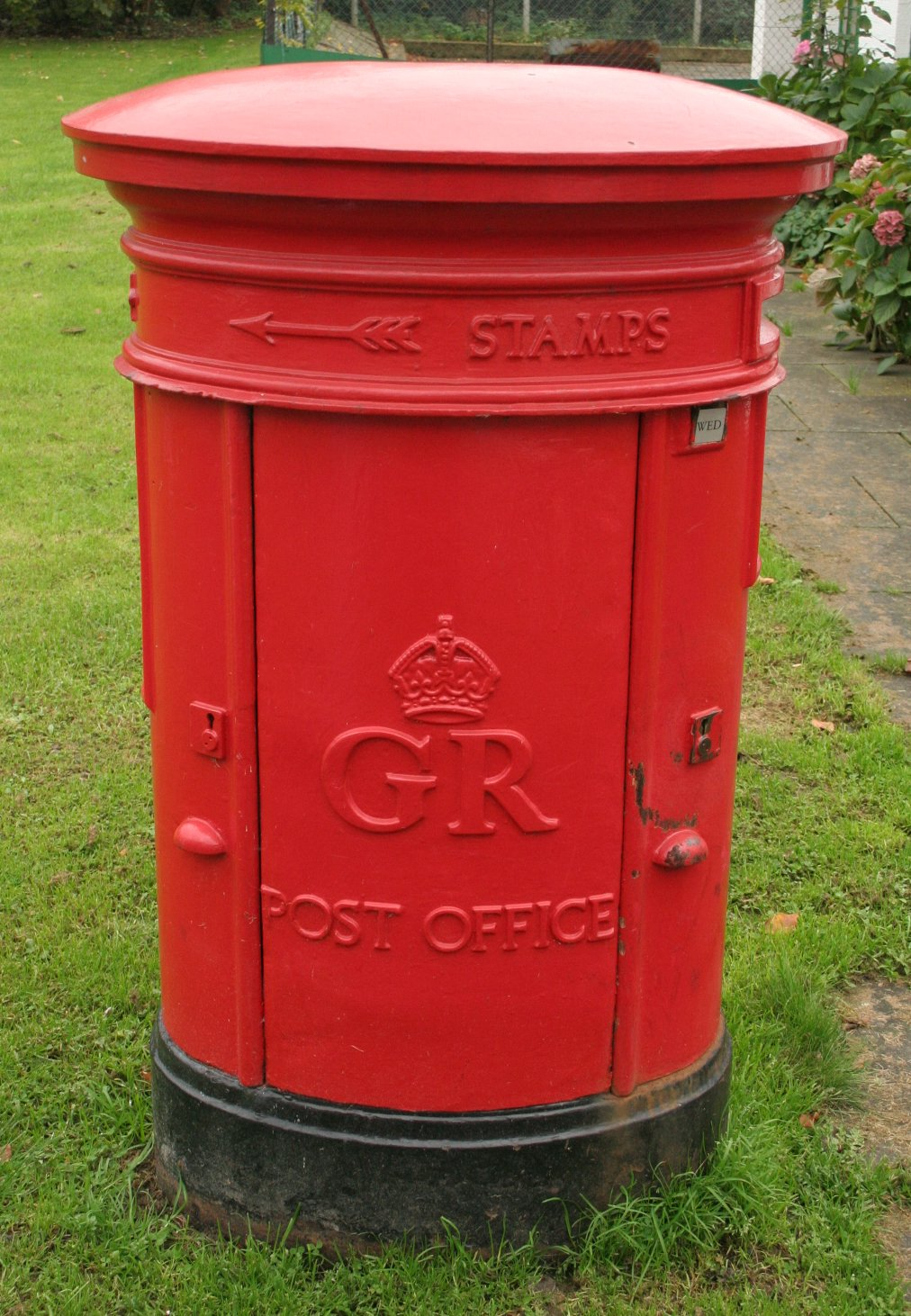
1932 Type E pillar box with integral stamp vending machine at Ealing Village

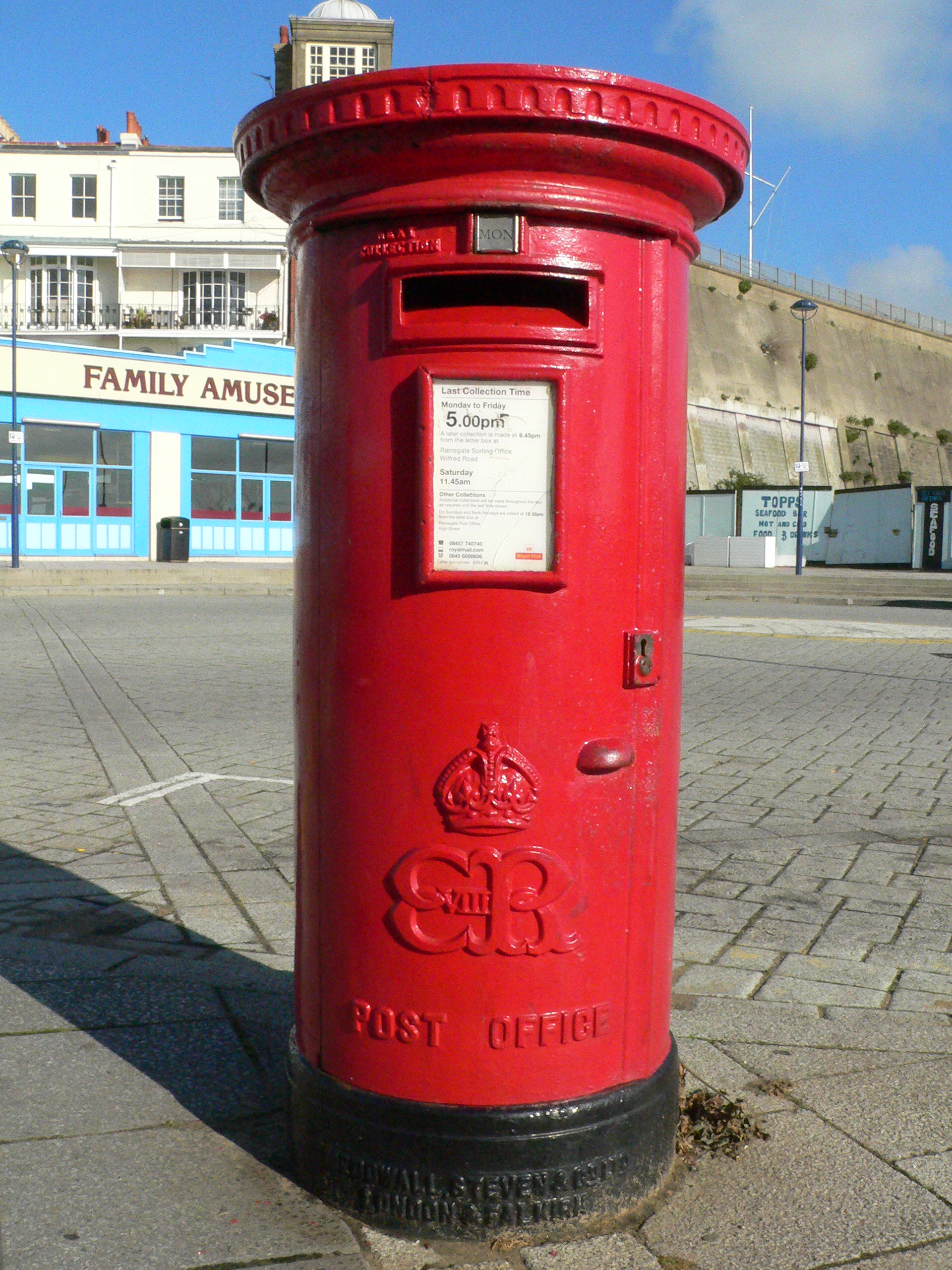
Rare Edward VIII Type 'A' pillar box in Ramsgate, Kent, England.

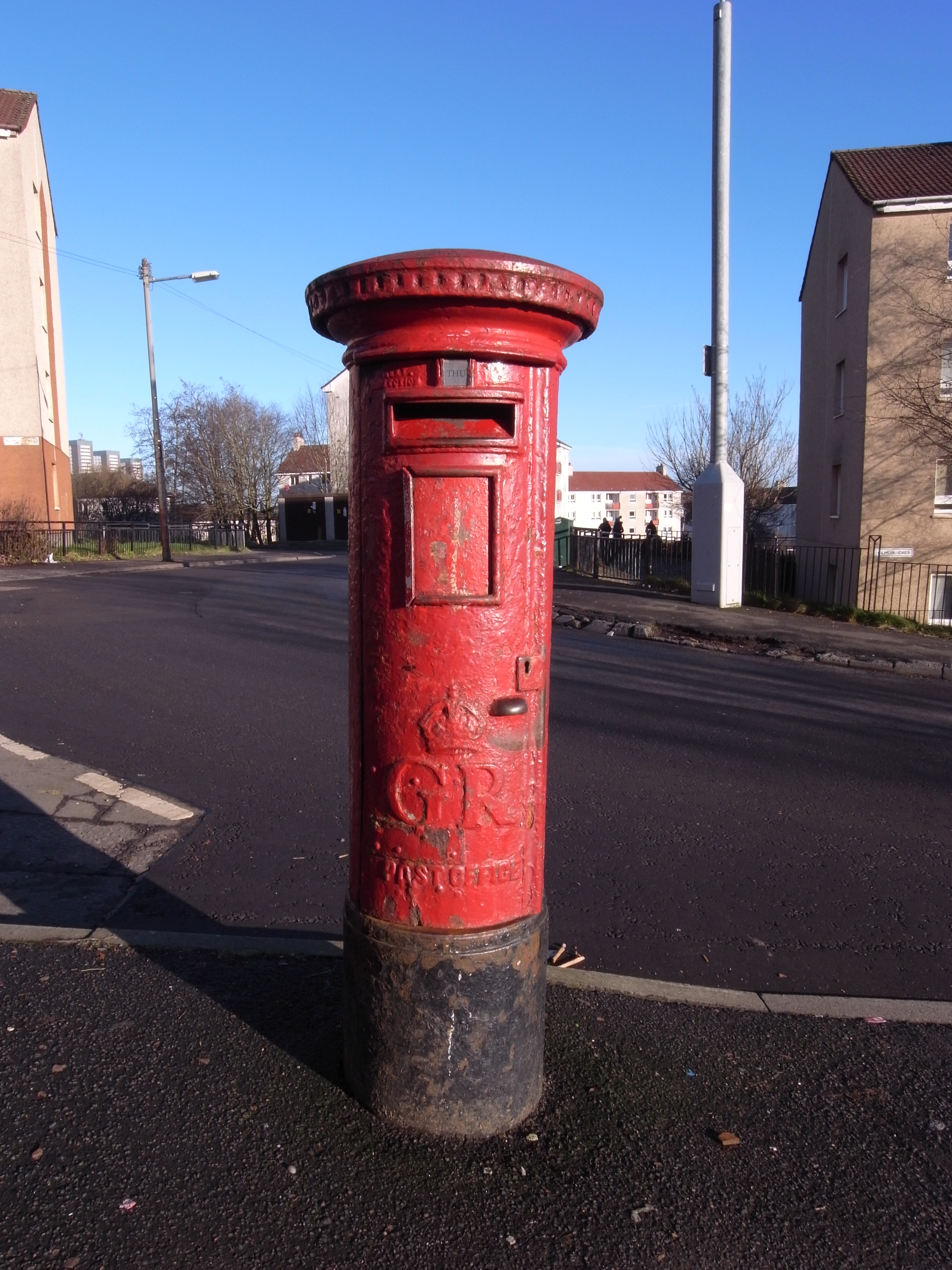
King George V post box by Carron Company. Glasgow, Arden, Kilmuir Crescent.

=== Air mail ===
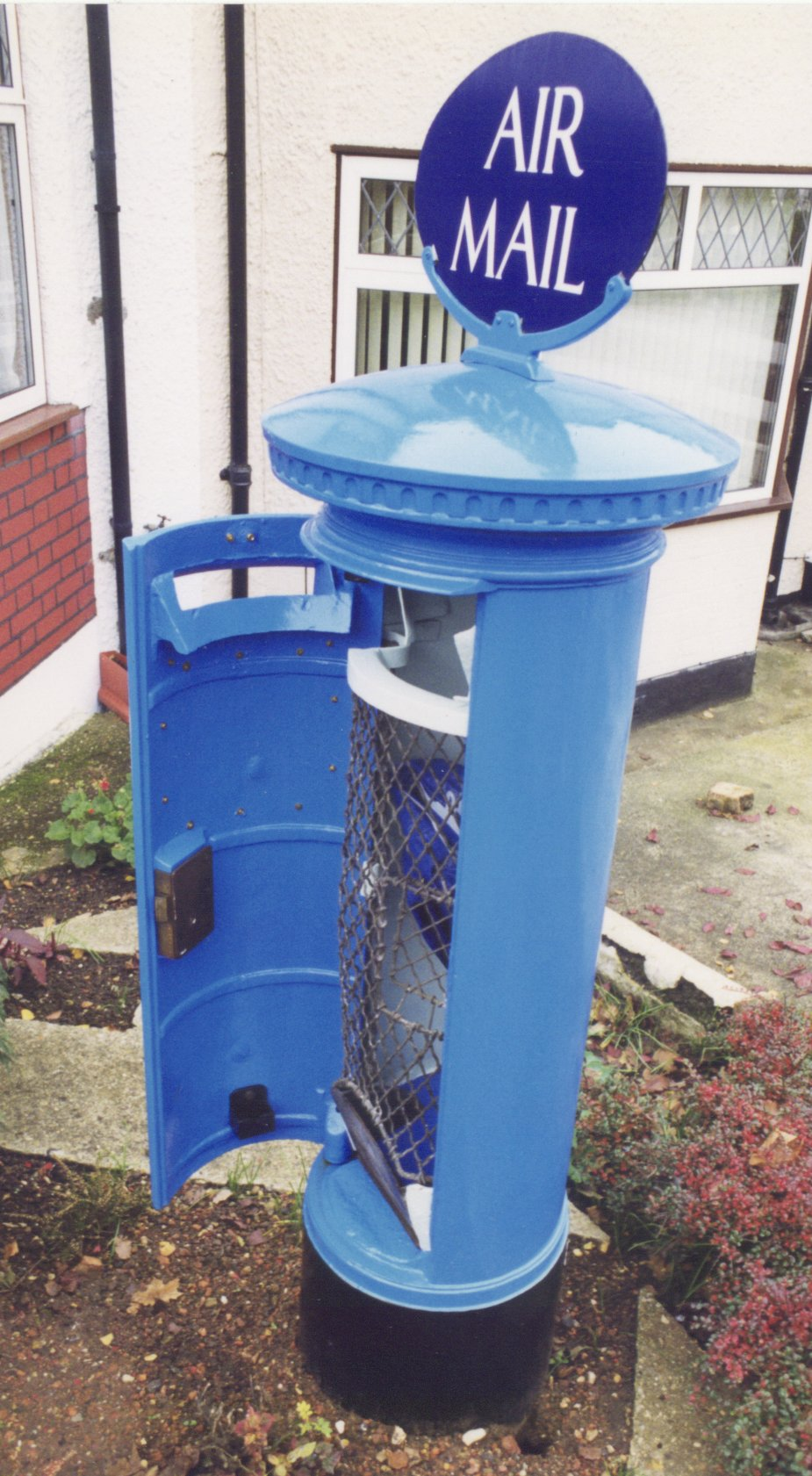
A rare Air Mail box in original colour scheme, now at the Isle of Wight Postal Museum

Commercial Air Mail service commenced in the United Kingdom in 1919. By the early 1930s Imperial Airways was operating regular airmail services to Europe and the British colonies and dominions. To facilitate easy collection of air mail and its speedy onward transmission, a fleet of special vehicles and dedicated postboxes were introduced. To distinguish them from regular post boxes, they were painted Air Force blue, with prominent royal blue signage. The service ran successfully until the outbreak of war in 1939, when it was suspended. Although Air Mail re-commenced after the War, the postboxes and vehicles were no longer identifiable, as Air Mail could now be posted anywhere.

=== Ireland ===
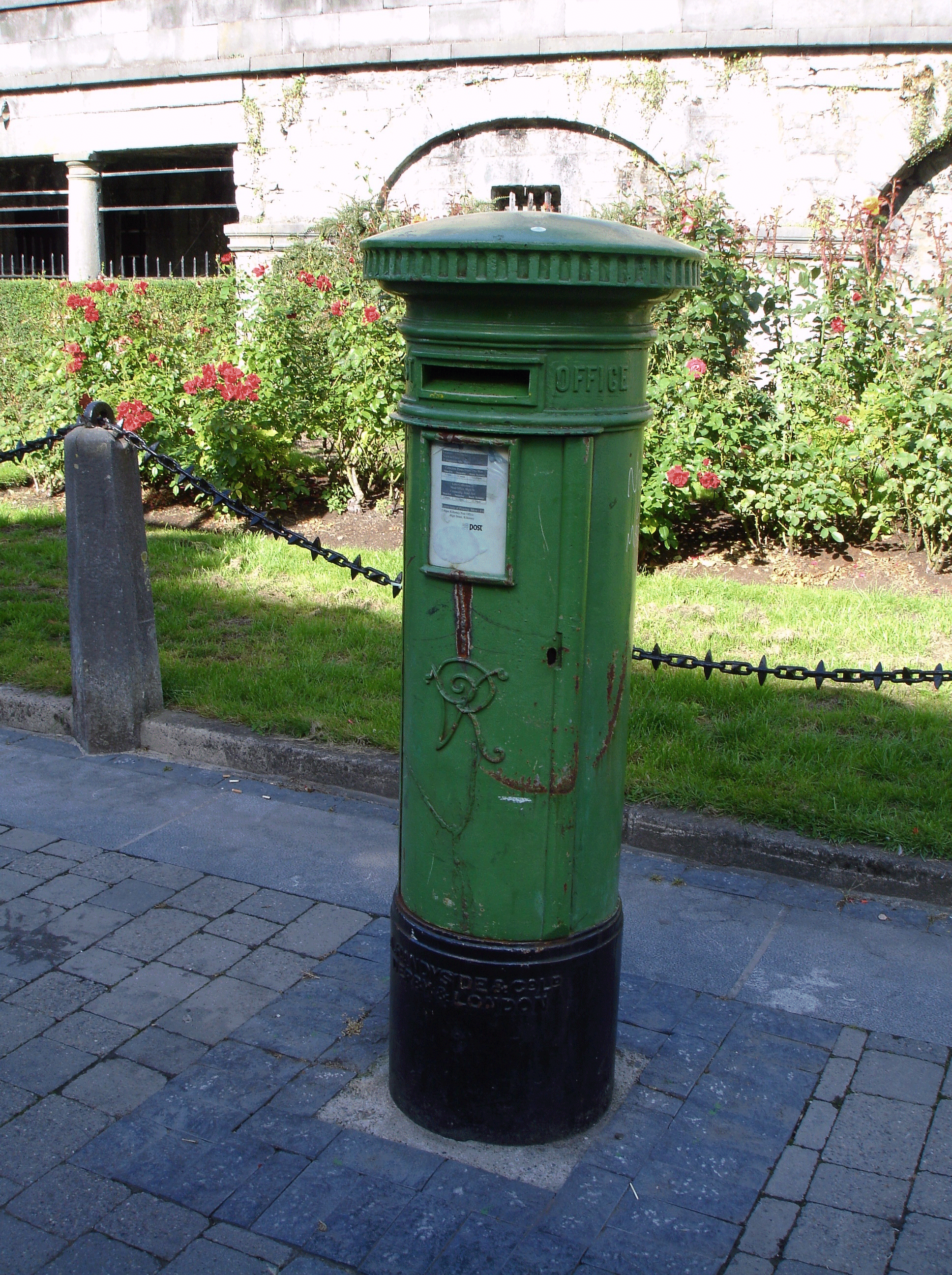
Repaired door on green 1887 VR Jubilee box in Kilkenny, Ireland

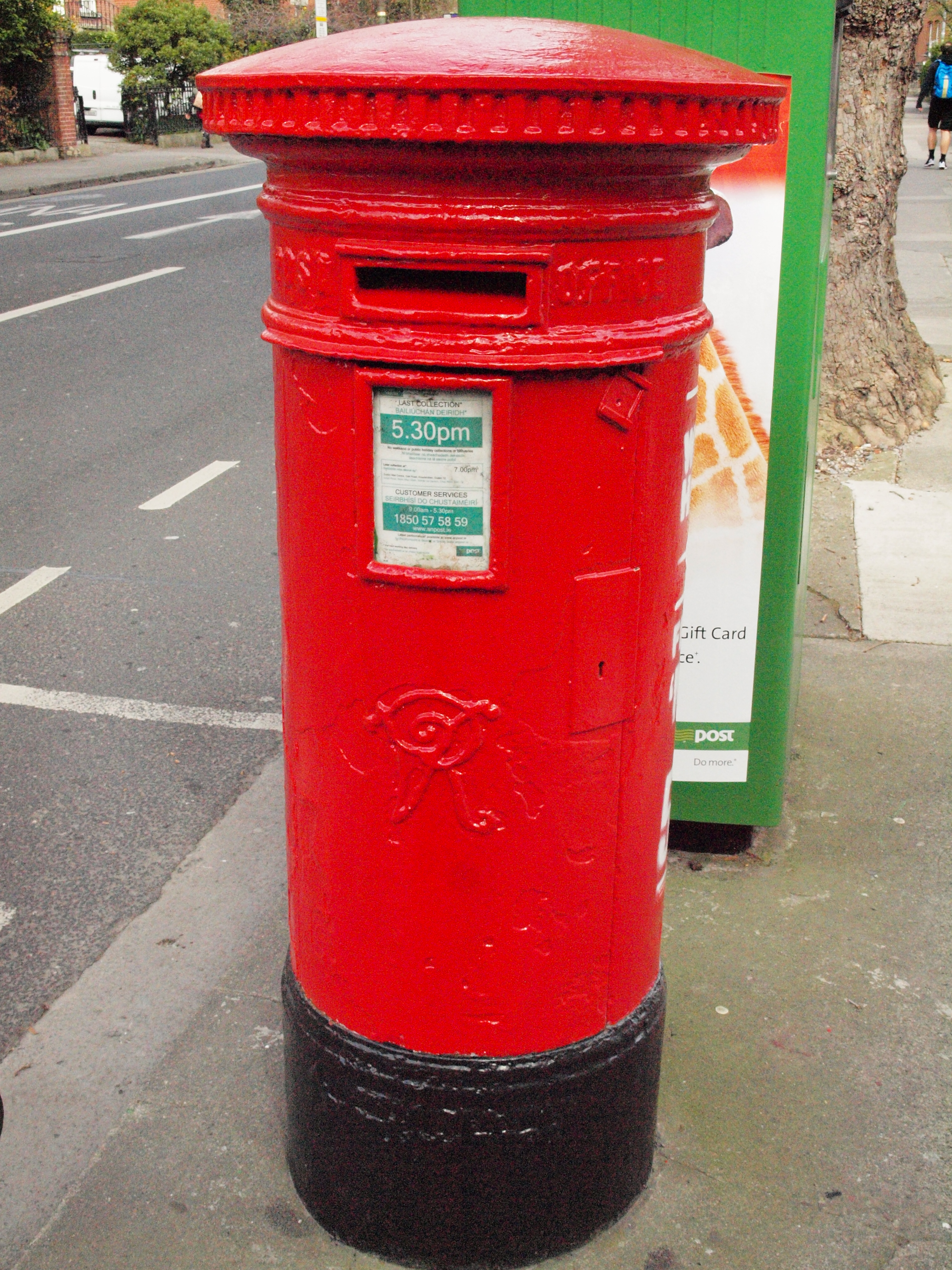
A commemorative red pillar box in Dublin in 2016

Following the creation of the Irish Free State in 1922, almost all United Kingdom-era pillar boxes and wall boxes were retained, but painted green. Hundreds of these are extant around Ireland, still bearing the cypher of the reigning monarch at the time of the box's manufacture. All are now protected structures. The Department of Posts and Telegraphs continued installing similar pillar boxes and wall boxes, but with the initials SÉ (for Saorstát Éireann), a harp or the Department of Posts and Telegraphs P ⁊ T logo, instead of a monarchical cypher. Since 1984 An Post, the current Irish postal administration, has used their logo to adorn its pillar boxes. All Irish counties, such as County Wicklow, have placed their extant United Kingdom-era pillar boxes on their lists of protected structures, meaning they may not be replaced without special planning permission having first been obtained.

In 1939 the IRA, as part of their S-Plan campaign, placed a number of bombs in post boxes in Britain. Later the Provisional IRA did so again in 1974. In 2016, to commemorate the centenary of the Easter Rising, a number of pillar boxes in Dublin were repainted to their original red colour scheme.

=== Elizabeth II ===
The next major design change came in 1968 with the introduction of the Type F pillar box. This was conceived by Vandyke Engineering and proposed to the Post Office as a cheaper alternative to the traditional cast box. It was fabricated in sheet steel with welded construction. However, the British climate did not suit the use of galvanised steel (a problem often seen with the 1940 and 1988 pattern of lamp box) and the Vandyke pillars soon began to rust badly. The very last one was removed from service at Colmore Row in Birmingham in 2002.

In 1974 the Post Office experimented with a similar rectangular design known as Type G. This was made in traditional cast iron by the foundry of Carron Company near Falkirk, Scotland. It was an operational success, but the public disliked the "square" designs and petitioned the Post Office for a return to cylindrical boxes.

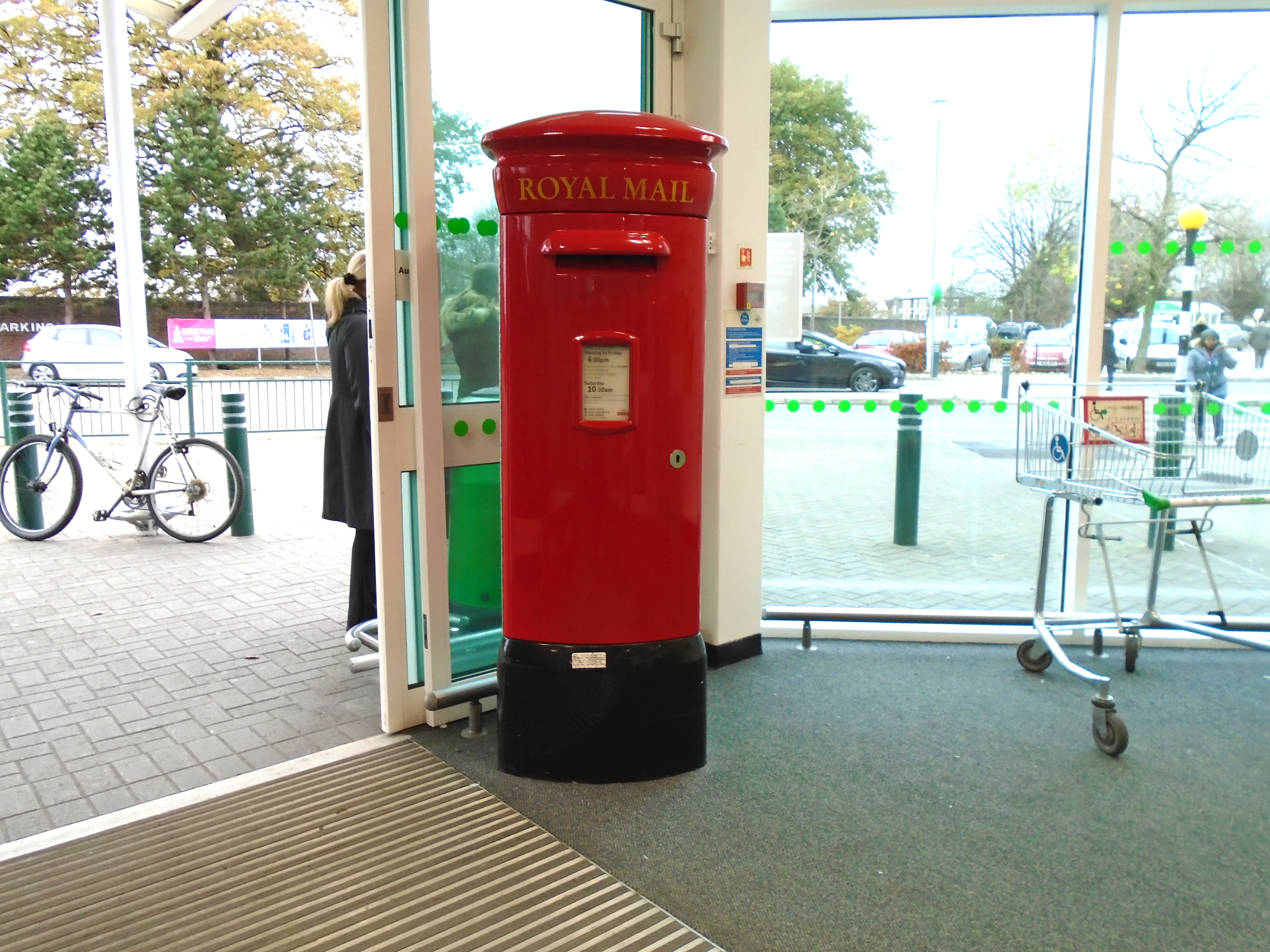
A glass-fibre type PB58 pillar box of the type frequently seen in British supermarkets, made by Broadwater Mouldings Ltd of Eye, Suffolk.

The Post Office commissioned a new design of pillar box in 1980 from a panel of three competing designers. The competition was won by Tony Gibbs and his design, which was thought to be ultra-modern at the time, was designated Type K by the Post Office. Made in traditional cast iron, it stayed in production until 2000. Notable features included: replaceable lifting ring screwed into the dome of the box, body and roof of box cast as one piece, large easy-to-read collection time plate, all surface details and collection plate window recessed to give a perfect cylindrical outline, integral restrictor plate, know colloquially as a "Belfast Flap" to restrict posting to letters only and a flanged shallow base suitable for installation in modern buildings, shopping centres and other urban areas. These boxes were thus much easier to move and handle as they could be rolled over level ground or lifted by crane into position. The design had one major flaw in the area of the door hinge, which is prone to snap under stress and the K type pillar boxes are no longer being installed.

For over a century most British pillar boxes had been branded with the words "POST OFFICE" as part of their design; but in the early 1990s this changed (following the functional separation of Post Office Counters Limited from the Royal Mail Letters and Parcels divisions). Since then, new pillar boxes have instead displayed the words "ROYAL MAIL".

Until 2015, all new pillar boxes for use in the UK were Type A traditional pillars or Type C oval pillars from the foundry of Machan Engineering, Denny, Falkirk, Scotland. The foundry, which was dissolved in 2016, was the sole supplier of cast-iron pillar boxes to the Royal Mail since the 1980s and had seen orders dwindle to a single box a year. Exceptions to this are the Supermarket or "Inside" boxes supplied by Broadwater Mouldings Ltd of Eye, Suffolk and the sheet steel "Garage" boxes supplied directly by Romec Ltd.

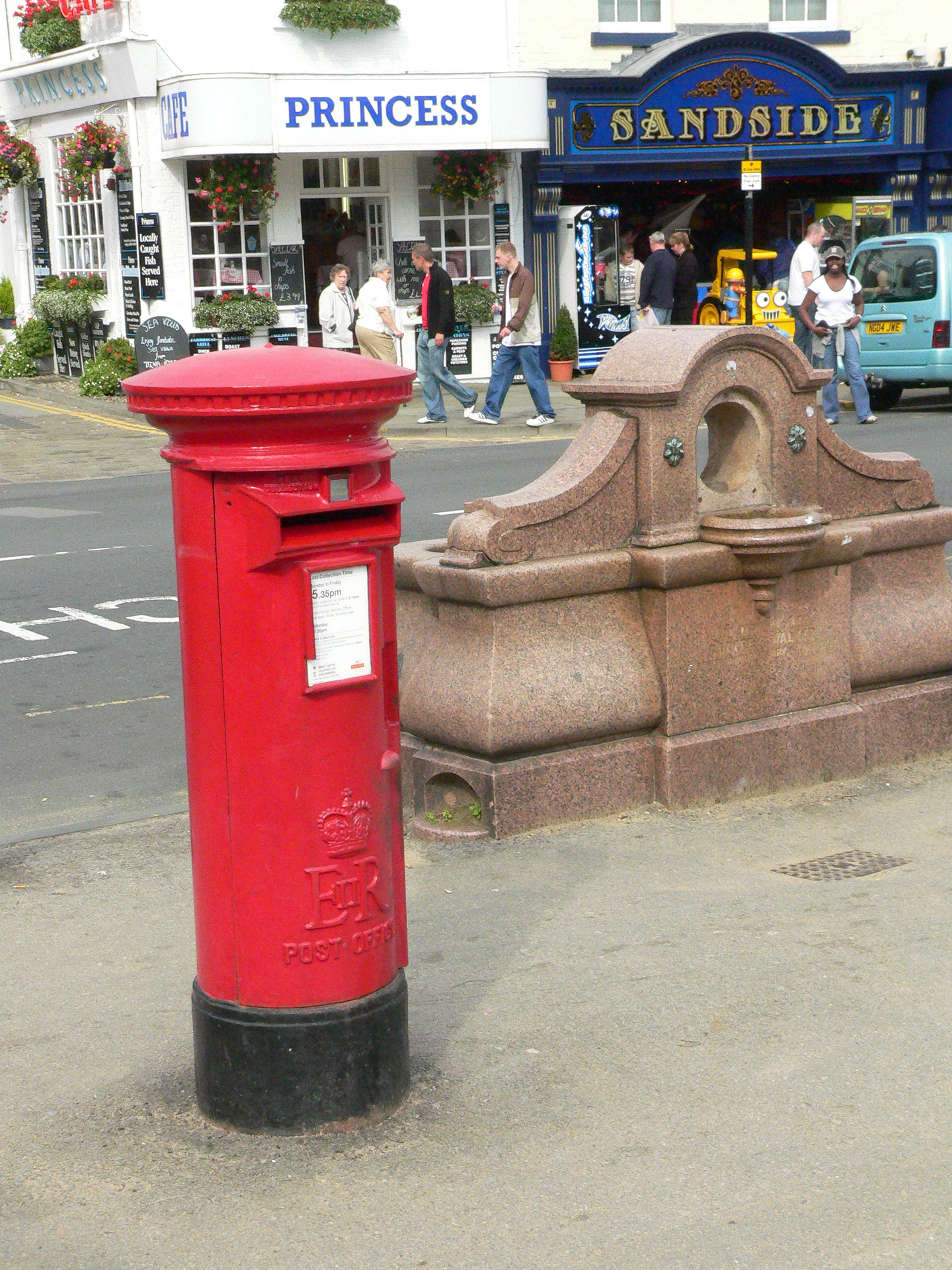
EIIR Type B pillar box in Scarborough, North Yorkshire.

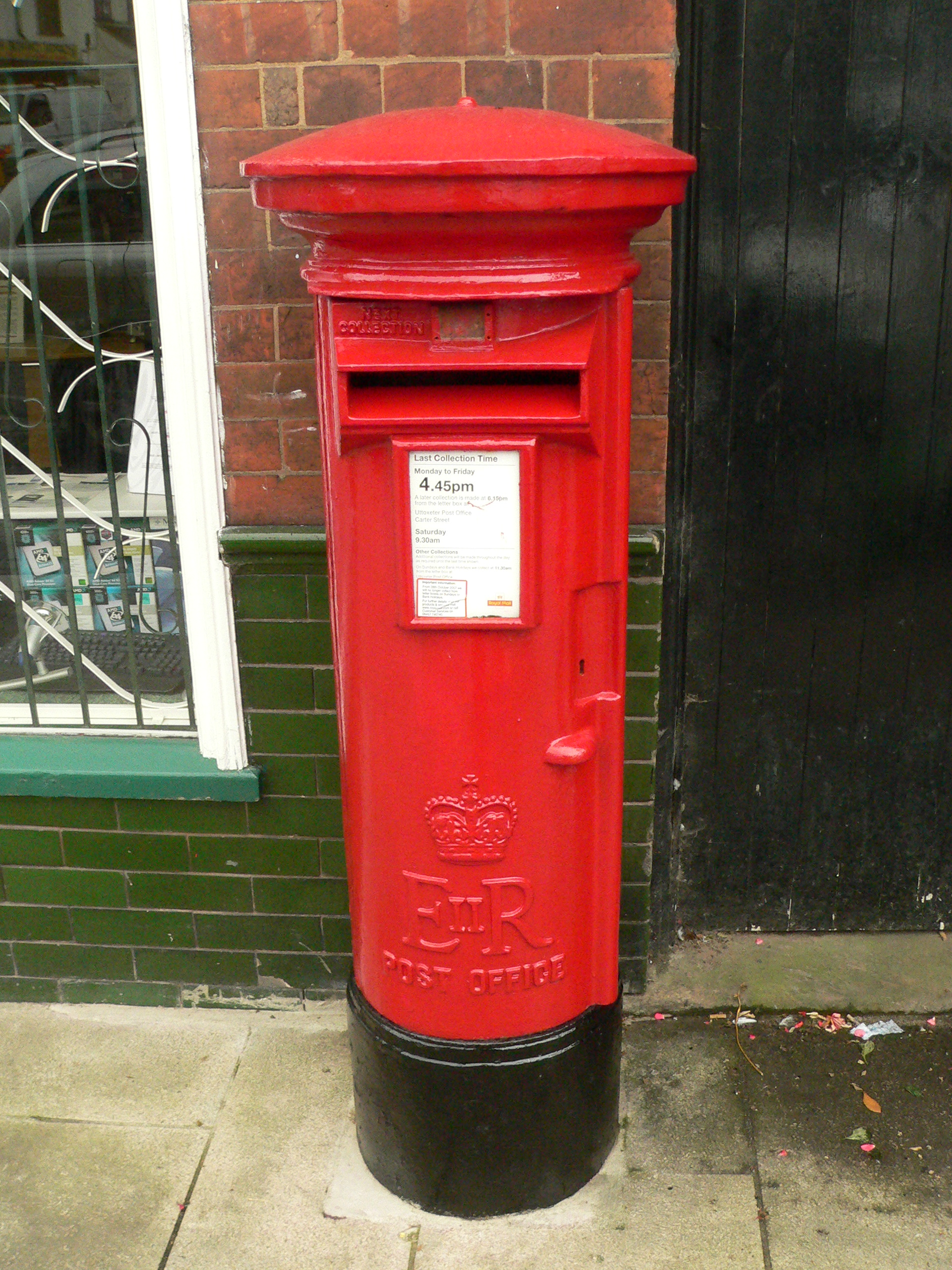
Elizabeth II Type B pillar box (Nigerian pattern) in Uttoxeter, Staffordshire, England.

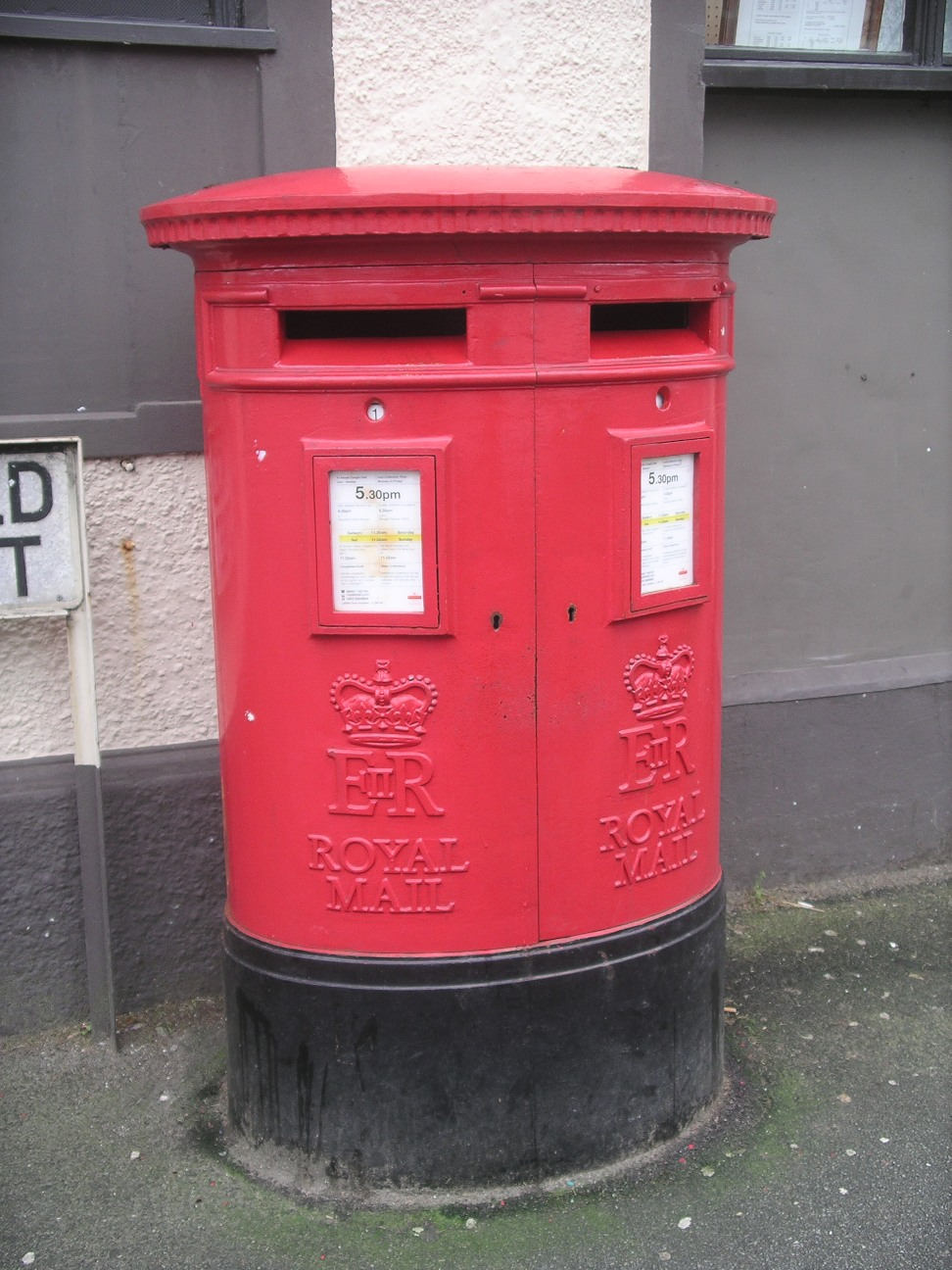
Modern Royal Mail branded EiiR Type C double aperture pillar box, Menai Bridge.

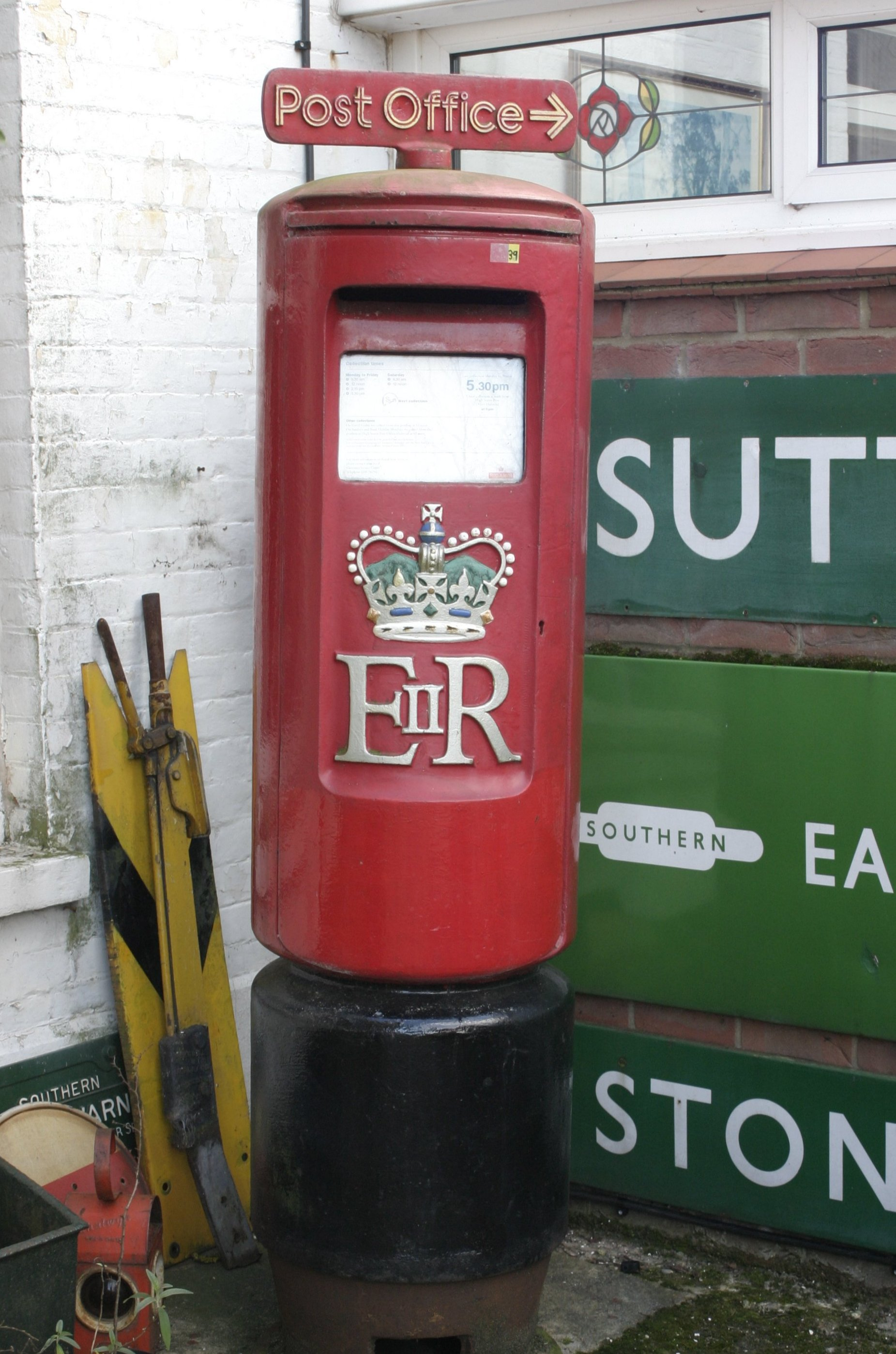
Type K pillar box of Elizabeth II fitted with a "Post Office Direction" sign

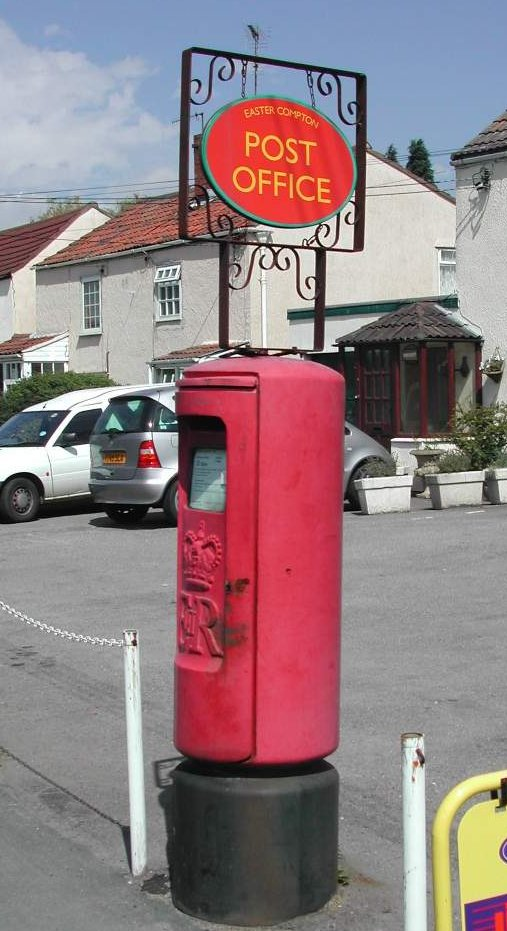
Unusual bracket carrying a Post Office "Lozenge" fitted to a Type K pillar at Easter Compton, South Gloucestershire

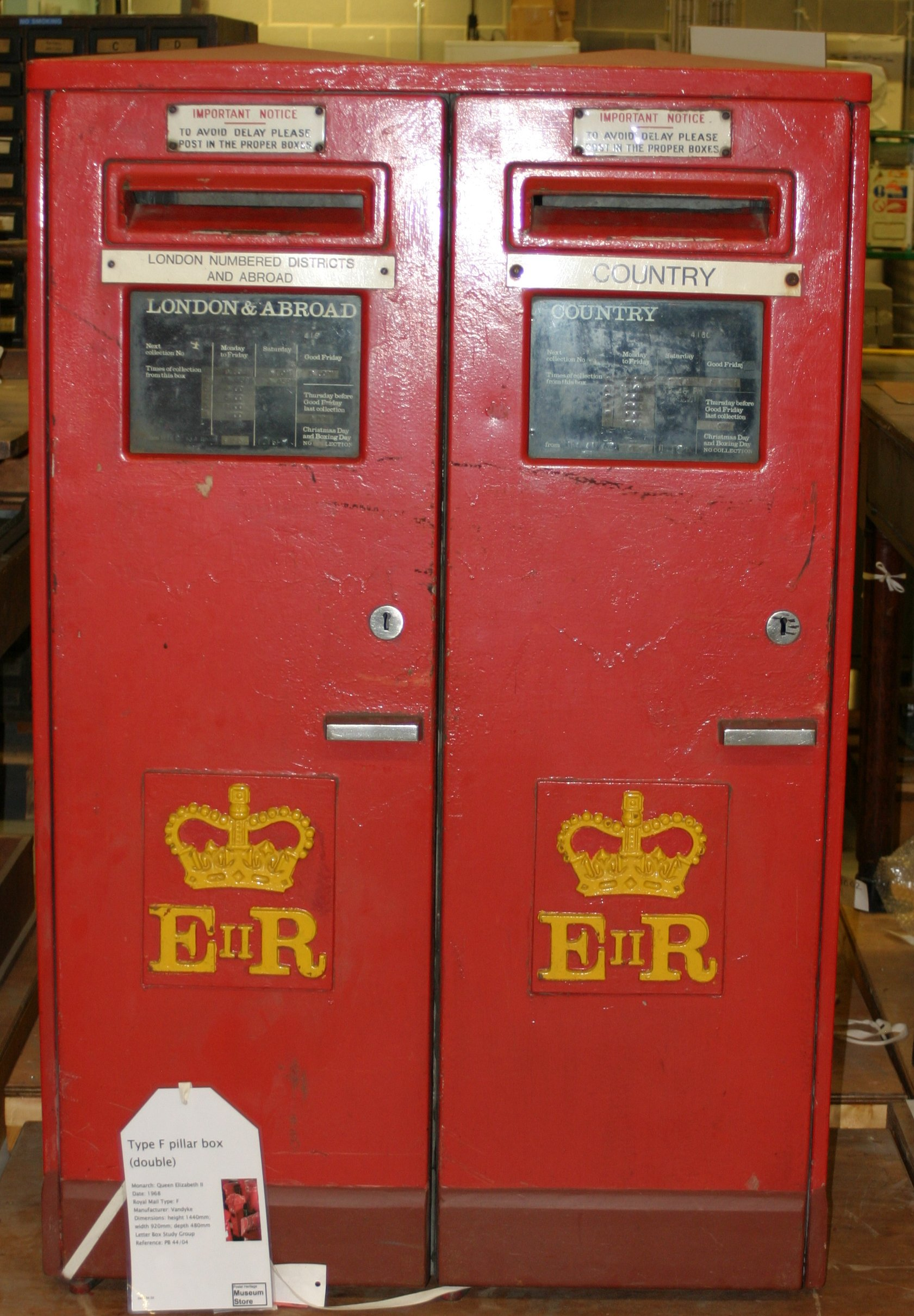
A rare double Type F pillar box by Vandyke Engineering (1968) at the BPMA Store, Debden, Essex.

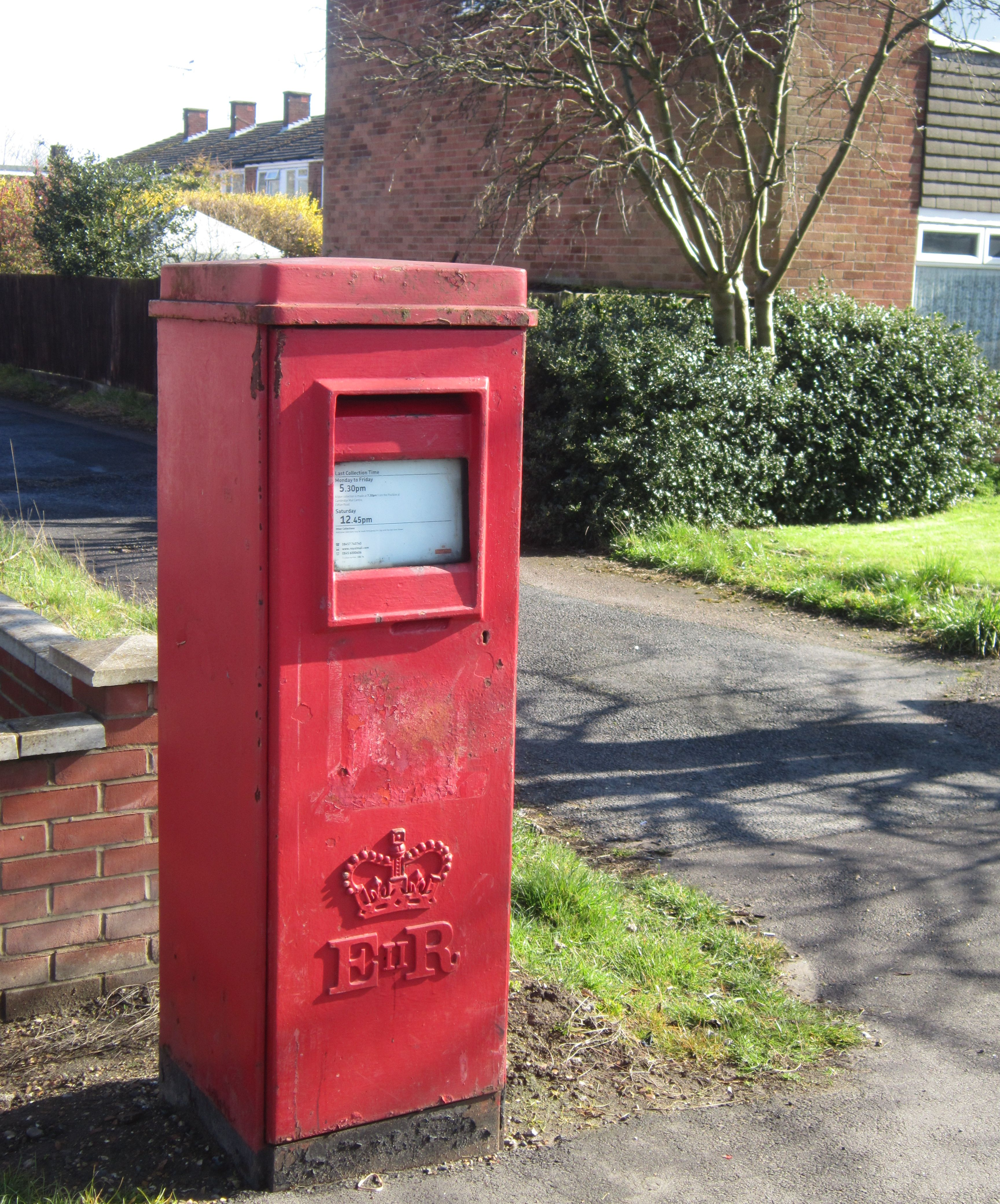
Type G (square) pillar box in Cambridge

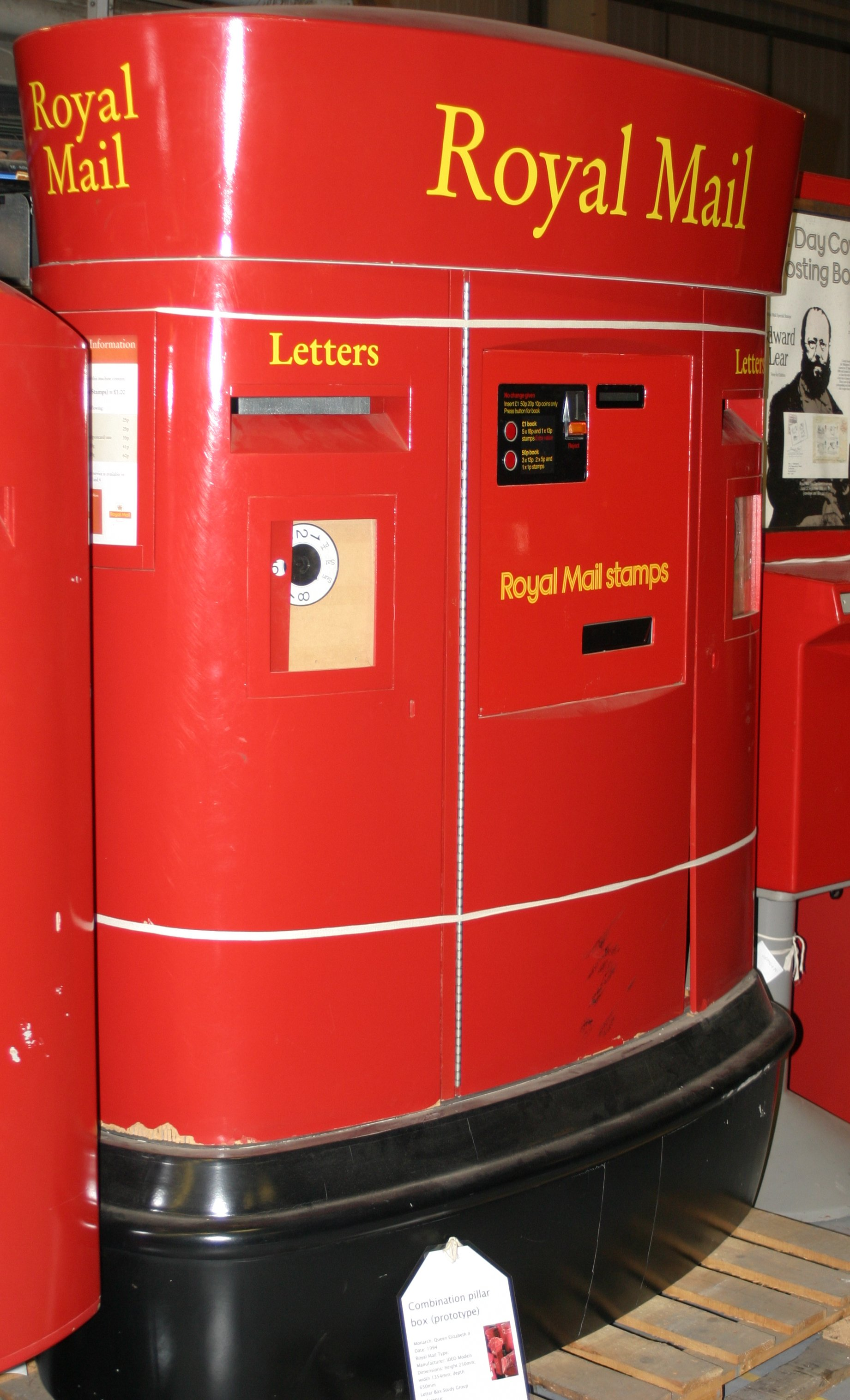
A prototype Post Office Suite by Ideo Design from 1989, now in the BPMA store, London

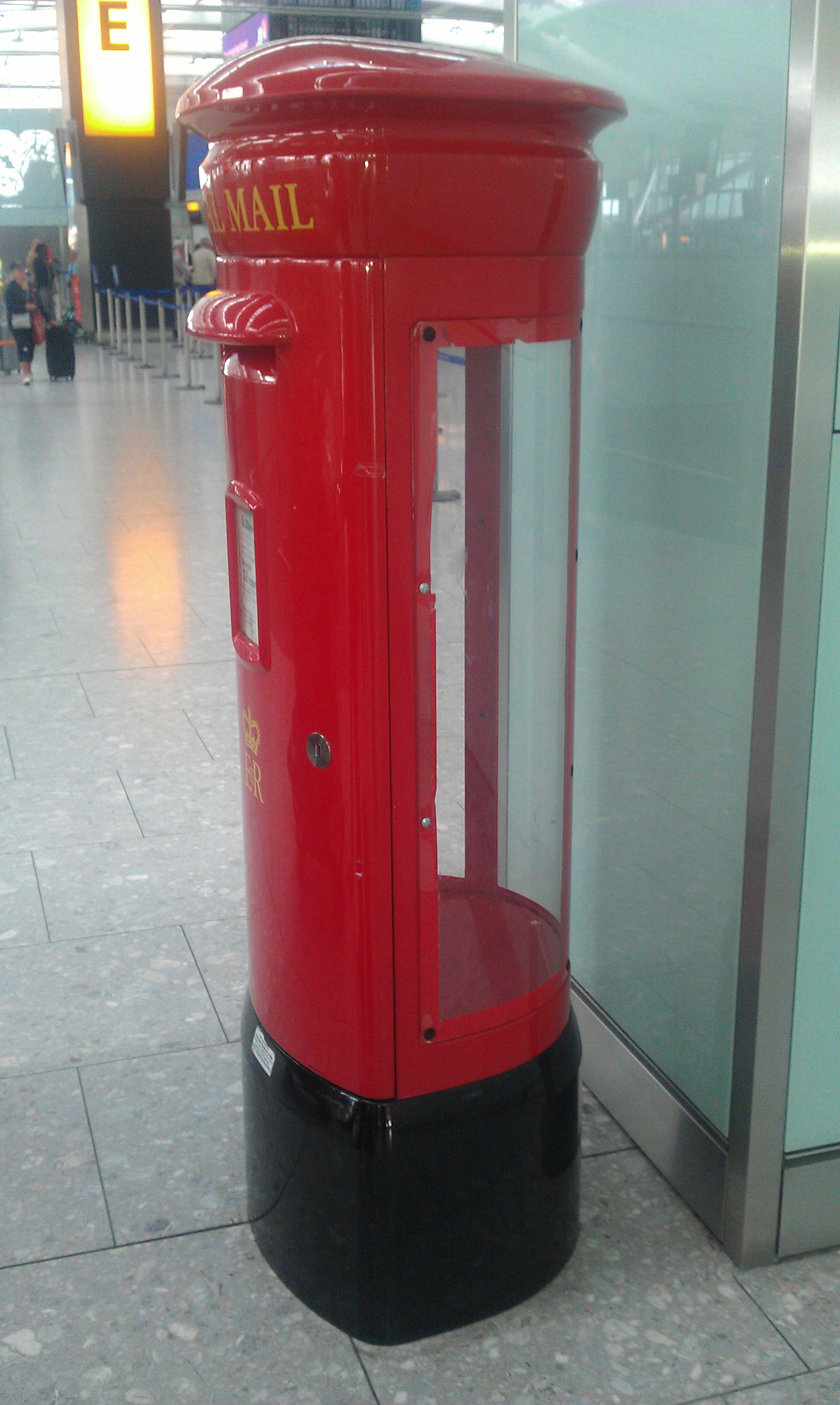
Box at Terminal 5, Heathrow Airport. The transparent panel allows visual inspection of the contents, for security purposes.

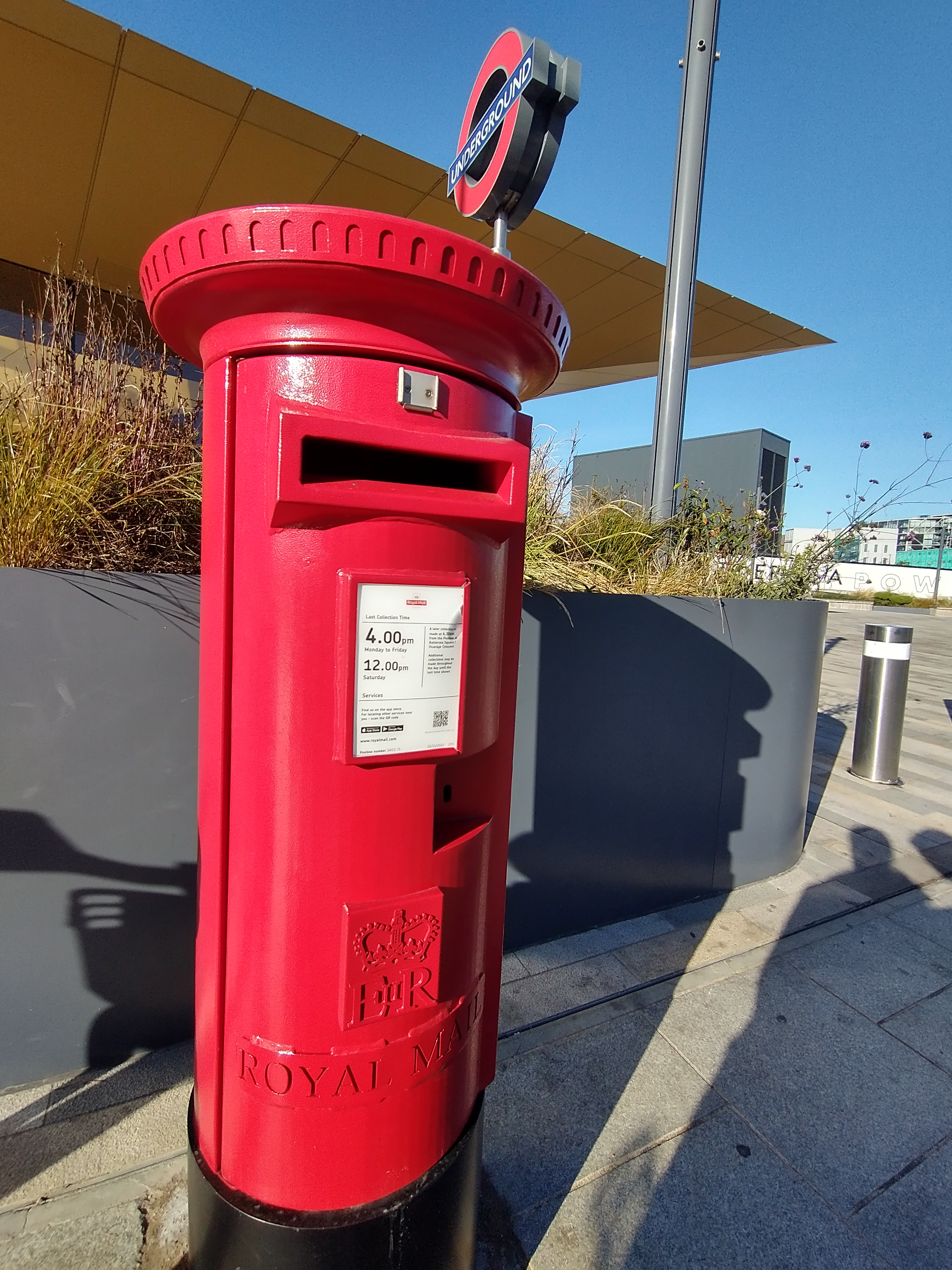
Pillar box made of welded rolled steel installed in 2023 in Battersea

In 2025, around 3,500 Elizabeth II post boxes started being converted to be solar powered and to accept small parcels.

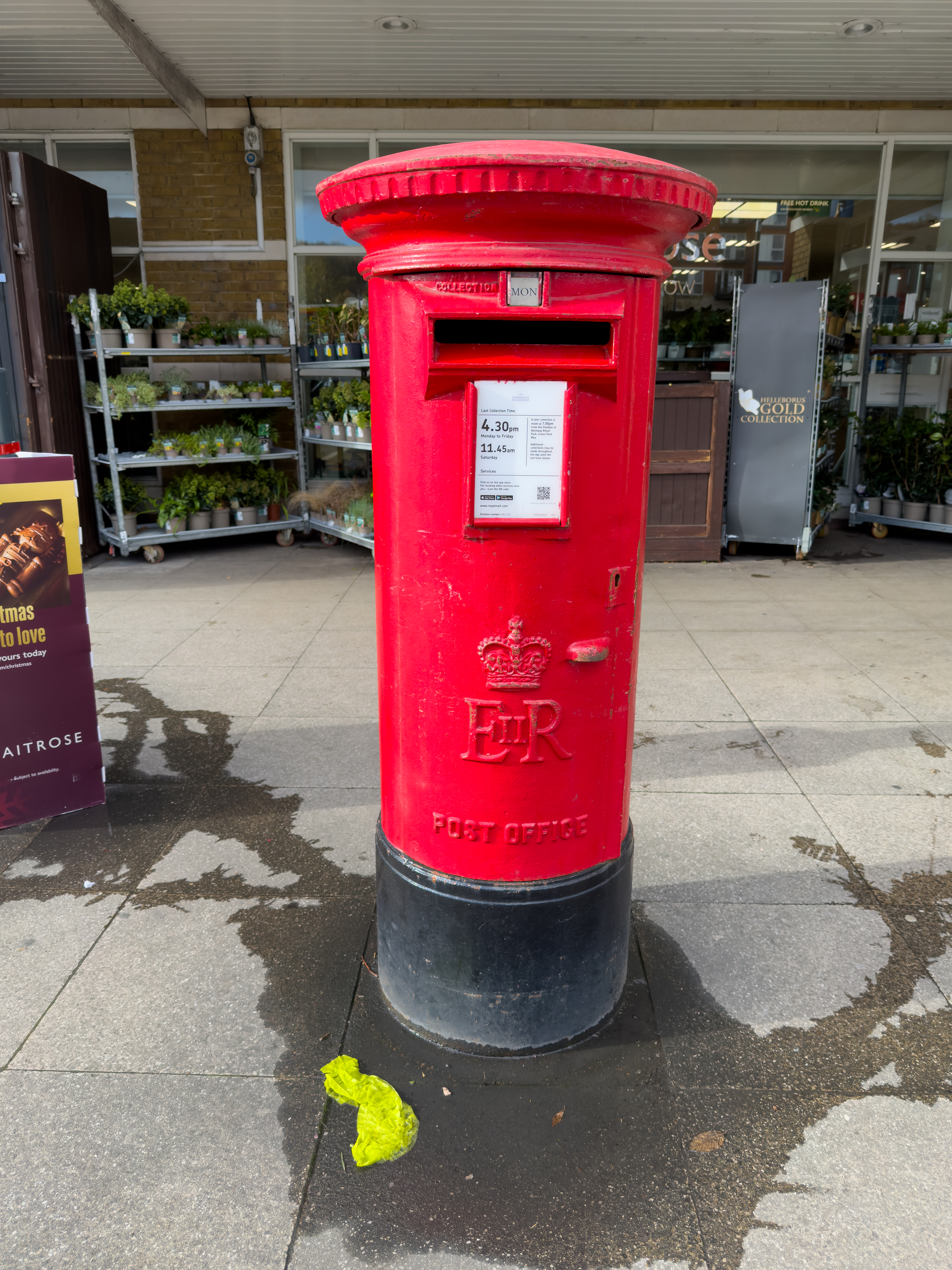
The same post box before ...

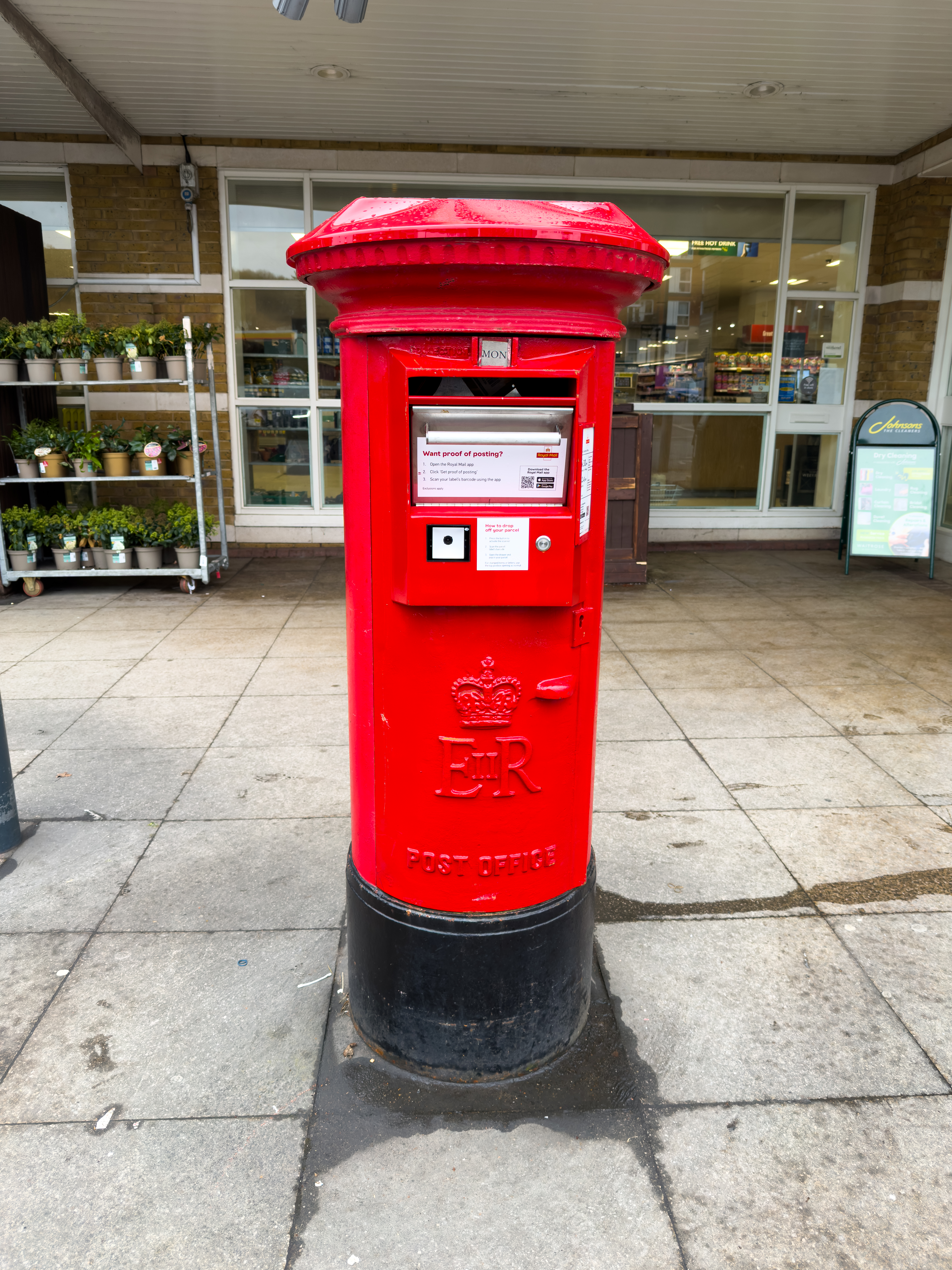
... and after conversion

==== Scotland ====
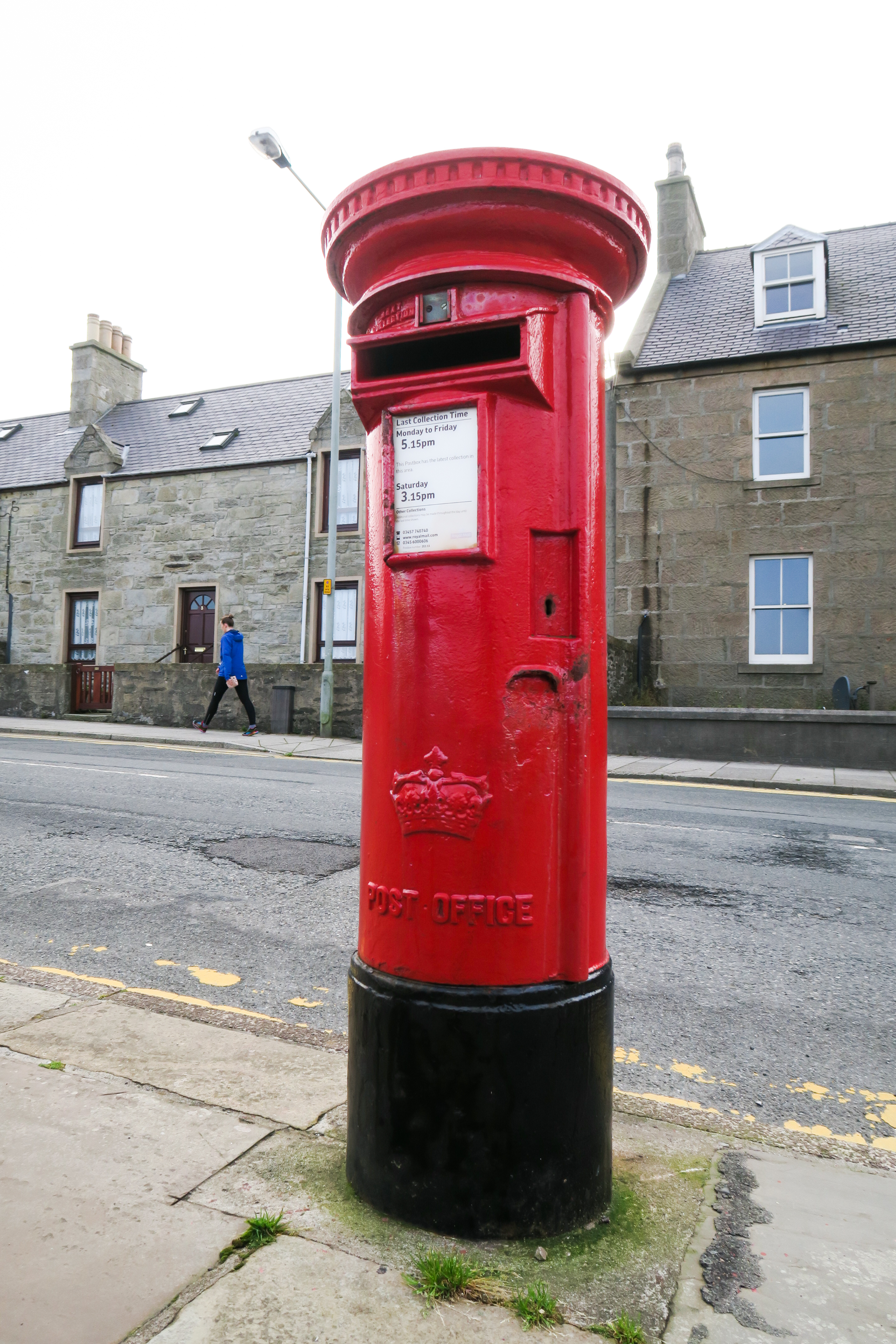
Pillar box in Lerwick, Shetland with the Crown of Scotland

In Scotland there was controversy when the first boxes made in the reign of Elizabeth II were produced. When the first one bearing the cypher "E II R" was installed in Edinburgh in 1952, a letter from "Scottish Patriots" was sent to the Chief Constable asking that action be taken against the Postmaster General on the grounds that Queen Elizabeth was the first Queen of Scotland and of the United Kingdom to bear that name, Elizabeth I having been Queen of England and Ireland only. The cypher on the box was subsequently damaged with a hammer and tar was poured over it, necessitating its removal for a costly repair. In February 1953, two letters were sent to the Postmaster by a group calling itself the "Scottish Republican Army", which threatened to destroy this and other boxes using explosives. The Edinburgh box was found to have a viable improvised explosive device inside, but it had not been primed to explode. A second device was found in another box soon afterwards. In April 1953, the prime minister, Winston Churchill, announced that there would be no changes made, but in December, an Edward VII box in Glasgow was set on fire with a note left threatening further action. In response the General Post Office announced that the Elizabeth II boxes would be replaced with ones which only bore the Crown of Scotland and no royal cypher. Red telephone boxes or kiosks of type K6 were also treated in the same way, so too GPO/Royal Mail lamp and Wall boxes.

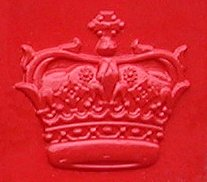
Stylised version of the Crown of Scotland, part of the Scottish Regalia

==== Olympic gold ====
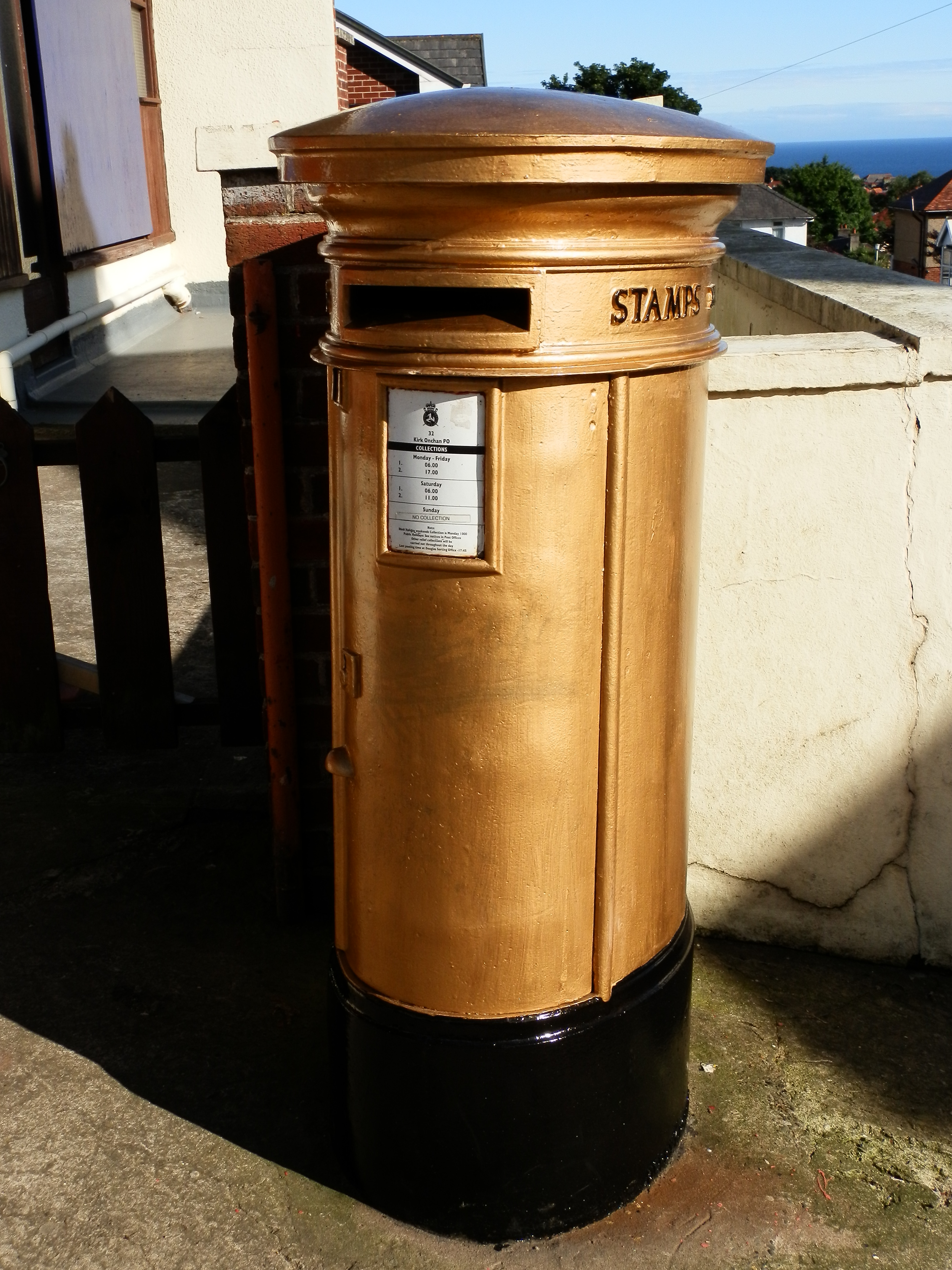
2012 Summer Olympics commemoration box. This example is a rare Type D pillar at Onchan, Isle of Man.

To mark the 2012 Summer Olympics, Royal Mail, Isle of Man Post and Guernsey Post painted a pillar box gold in the home town of each Great Britain team member who won a gold medal, as well as a demonstration model near Westminster Abbey. A website mapping the gold boxes was provided. It was decided that the boxes, originally intended to be repainted to the traditional red in due course, would remain gold painted permanently.

==== Black History Month ====
In September 2020 four pillar boxes were painted black, with gold tops to mark Black History Month in October. They are located in London, Glasgow, Cardiff and Belfast. The London postbox, in Acre Lane, Brixton, features the painting "Queuing at the RA" by Yinka Shonibare. The Glasgow postbox, in Byres Road, features footballer and Army officer Walter Tull. The Cardiff postbox, in King Edward VII Avenue, depicts Mary Seacole and the Bedford Street pillar, in Belfast depicts Sir Lenny Henry, a stand-up comedian, actor, singer, writer and television presenter and co-founder of the Comic Relief charity.

=== Charles III ===
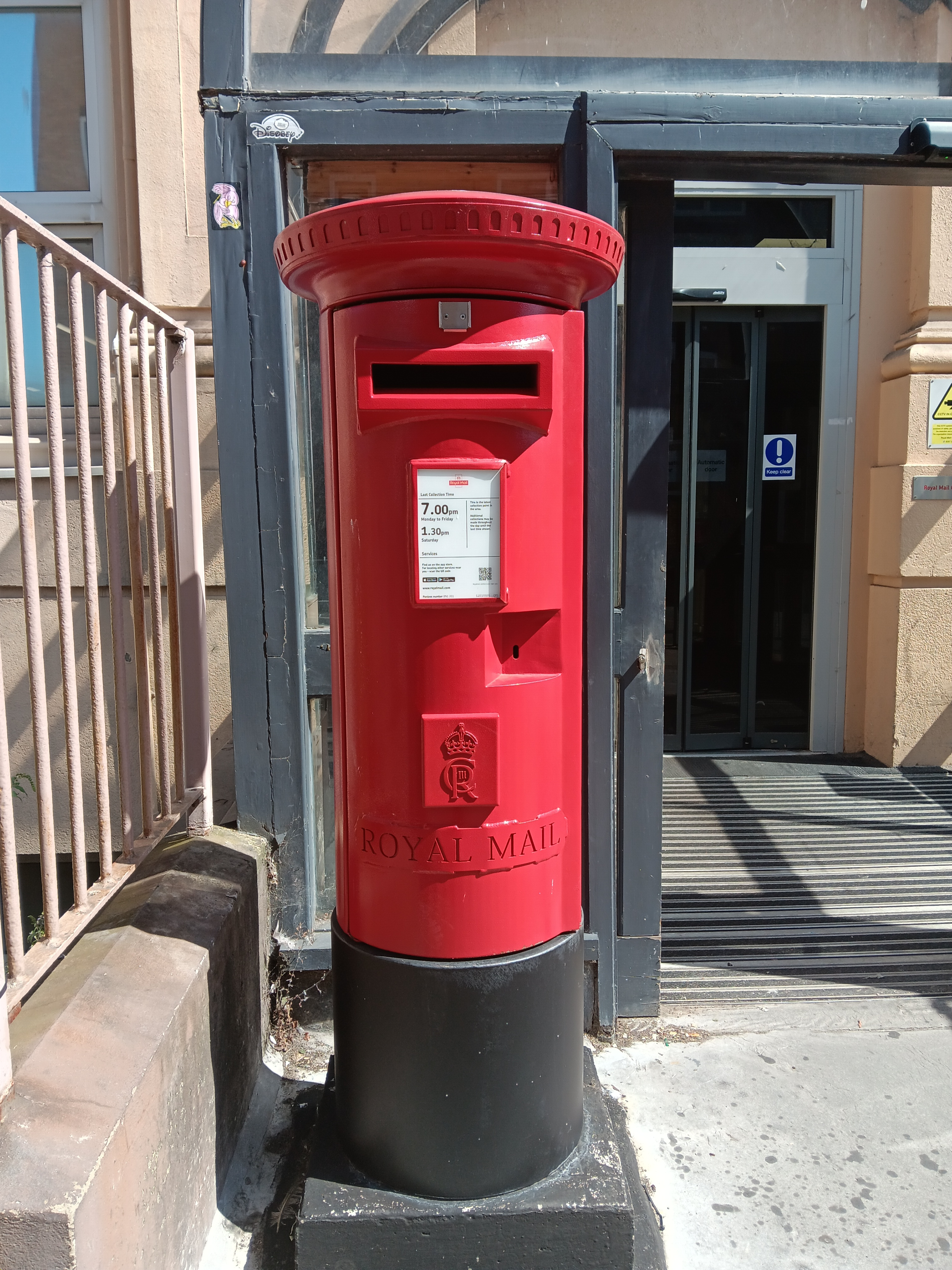
The pillar box bears CIIIR cypher, Brighton Delivery Office

The first post box to carry the insignia of King Charles III was unveiled on 12 July 2024, in Great Cambourne, Cambridgeshire. This featured the new CR III cypher, painted in gold. The first postbox with this cypher in Wales, located by a delivery office on Severn Street, in Welshpool, Powys, unveiled on 21 March 2025, likewise had a gold cypher on a red body. However, other postboxes have been installed that are painted entirely red, without a gold cypher.

In 2025 Royal Mail began to modify some pillar boxes to include a barcode scanner and parcel drawer, powered by solar panels.

=== No longer in use ===
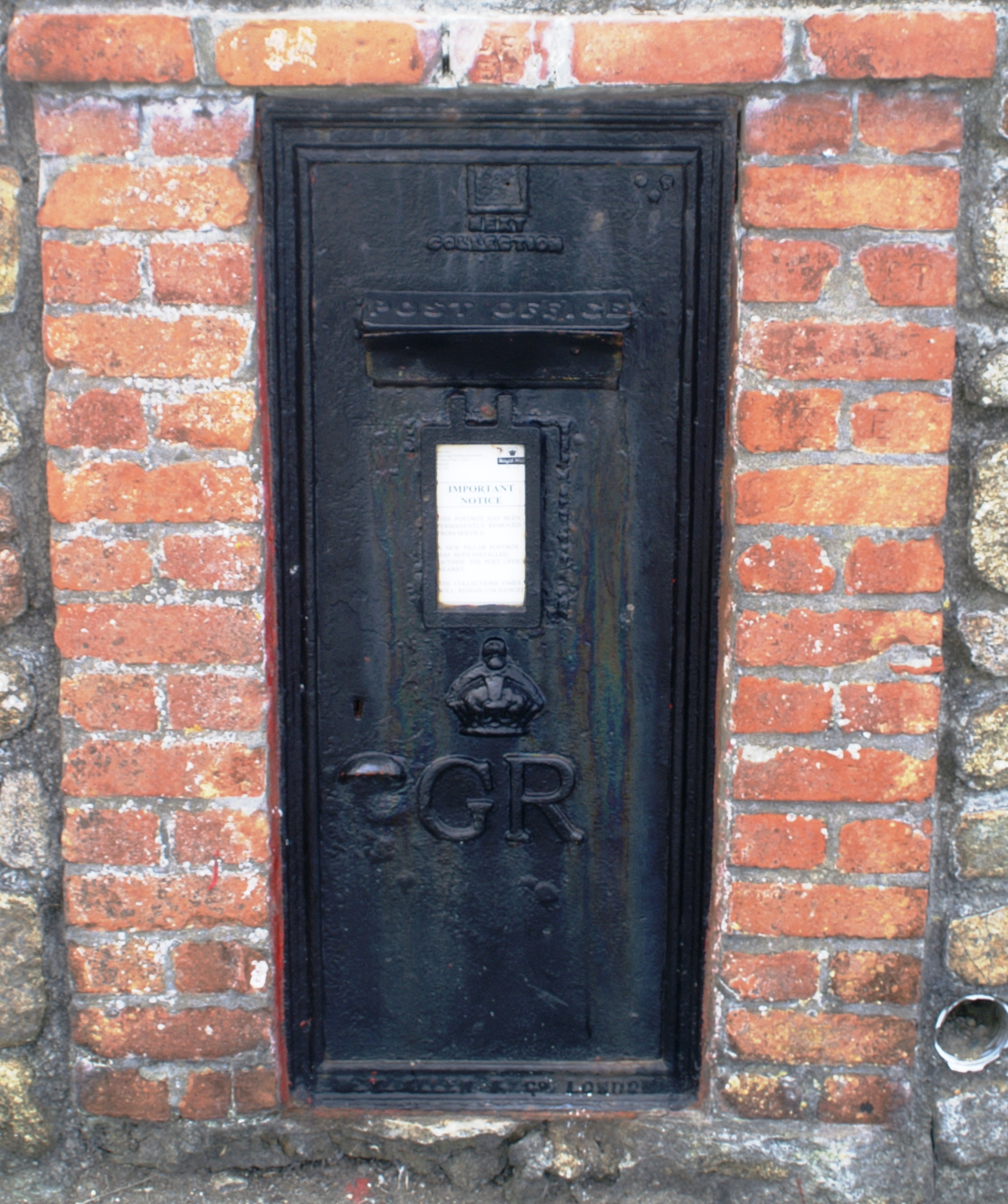
Painted black to show that it is out of use

To reflect the iconic nature of the British post box and the heritage attached to them; out-of-use post boxes (especially older models) are rarely removed and instead painted black and sealed to signify to members of the public the box is no longer in use. Examples of 'black post boxes' can be seen outside former post-offices and in conservation areas.

== Overseas ==
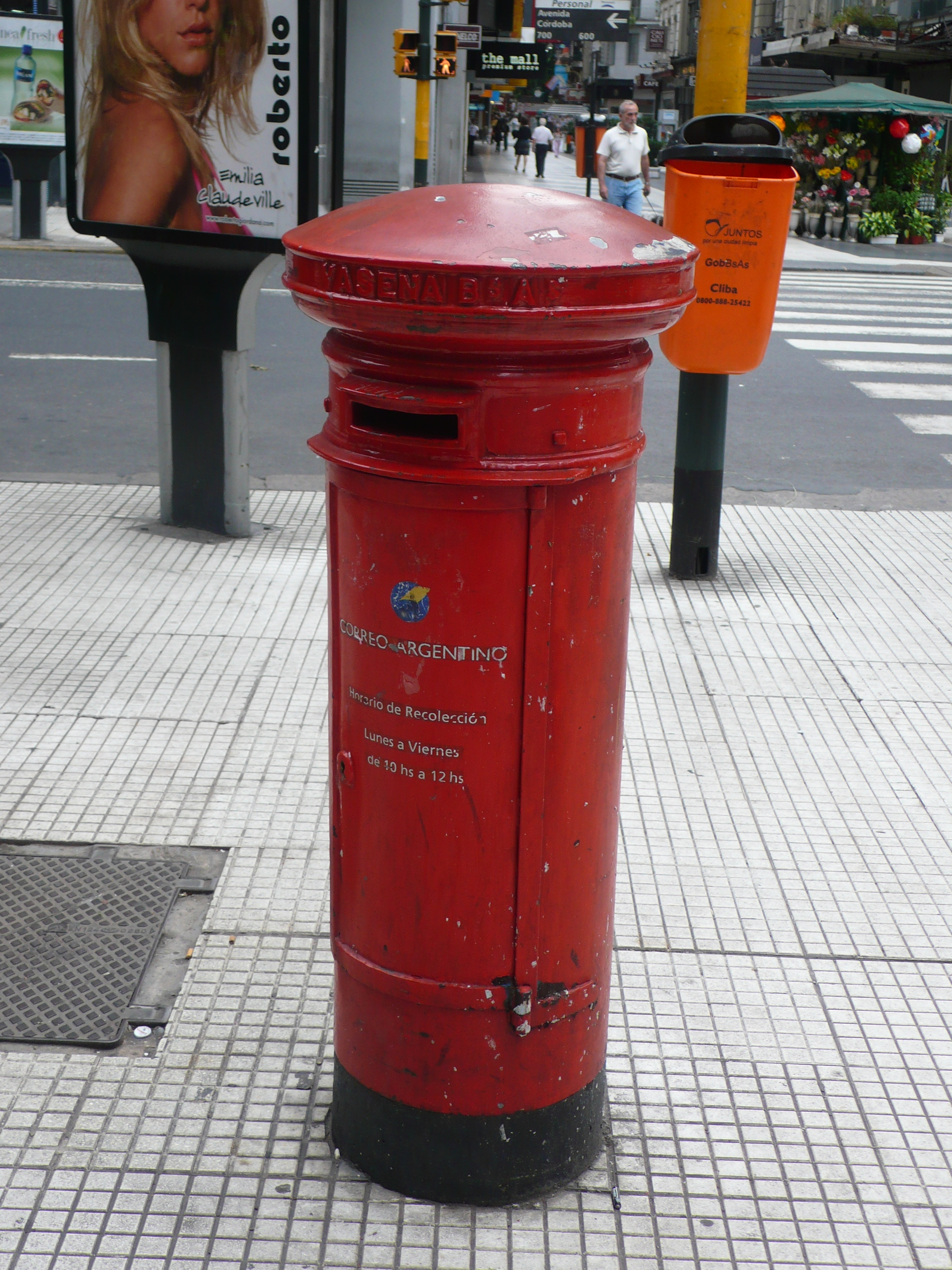
Pillar box in Buenos Aires, Argentina

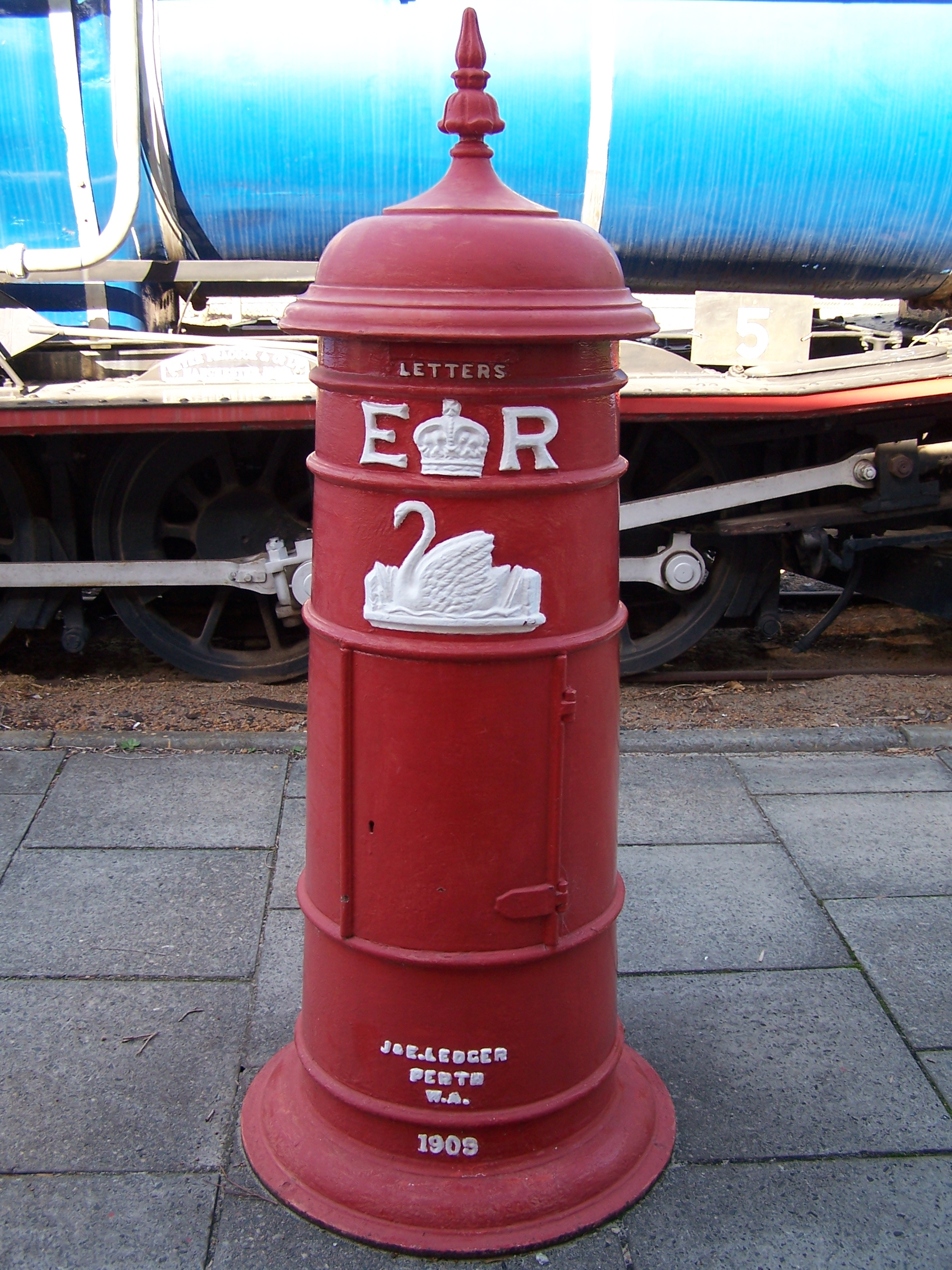
Australian-made Edward VII pillar box at the Western Australian Rail Transport Museum, Bassendean

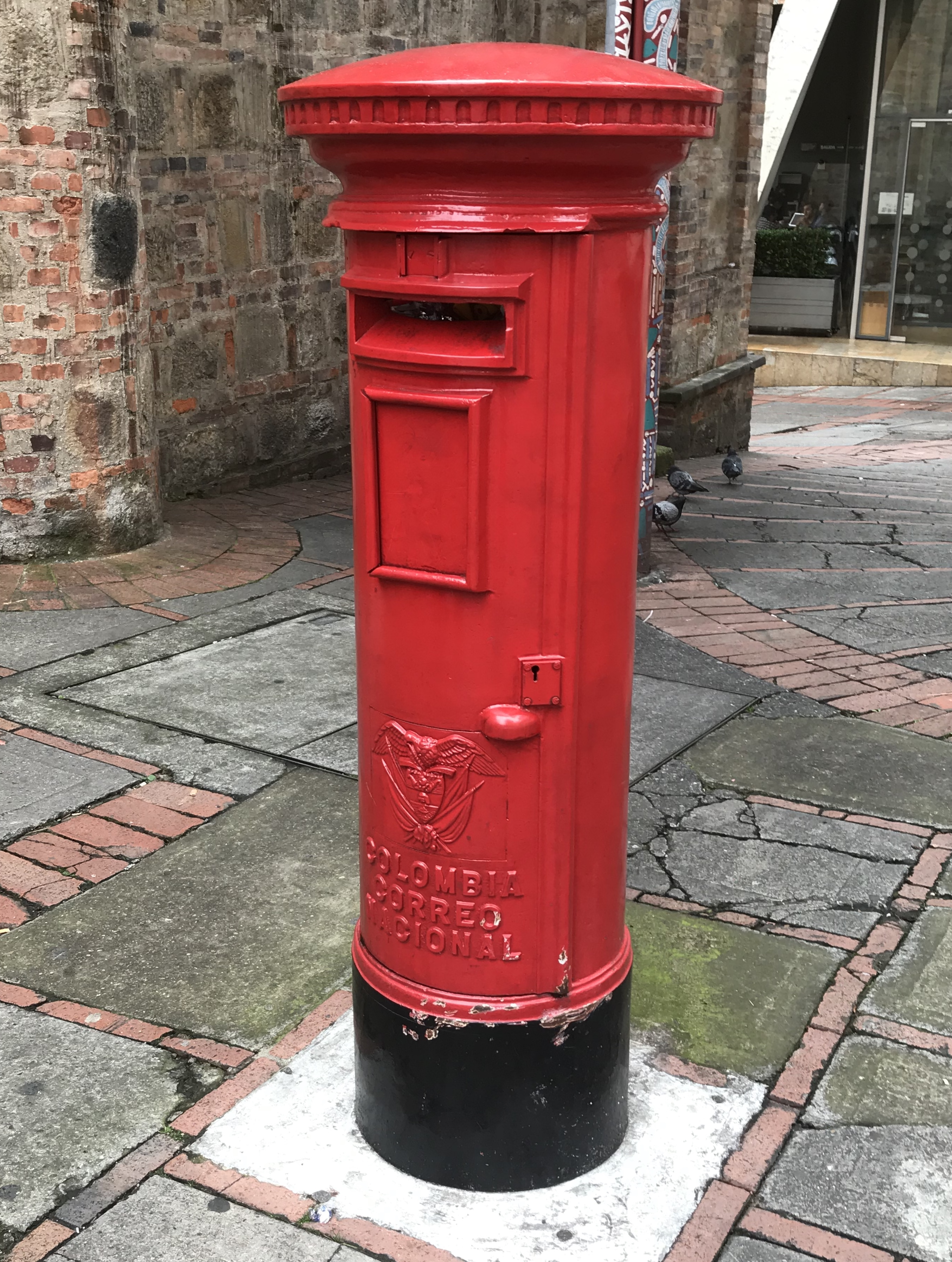
Pillar box in Bogotá, Colombia

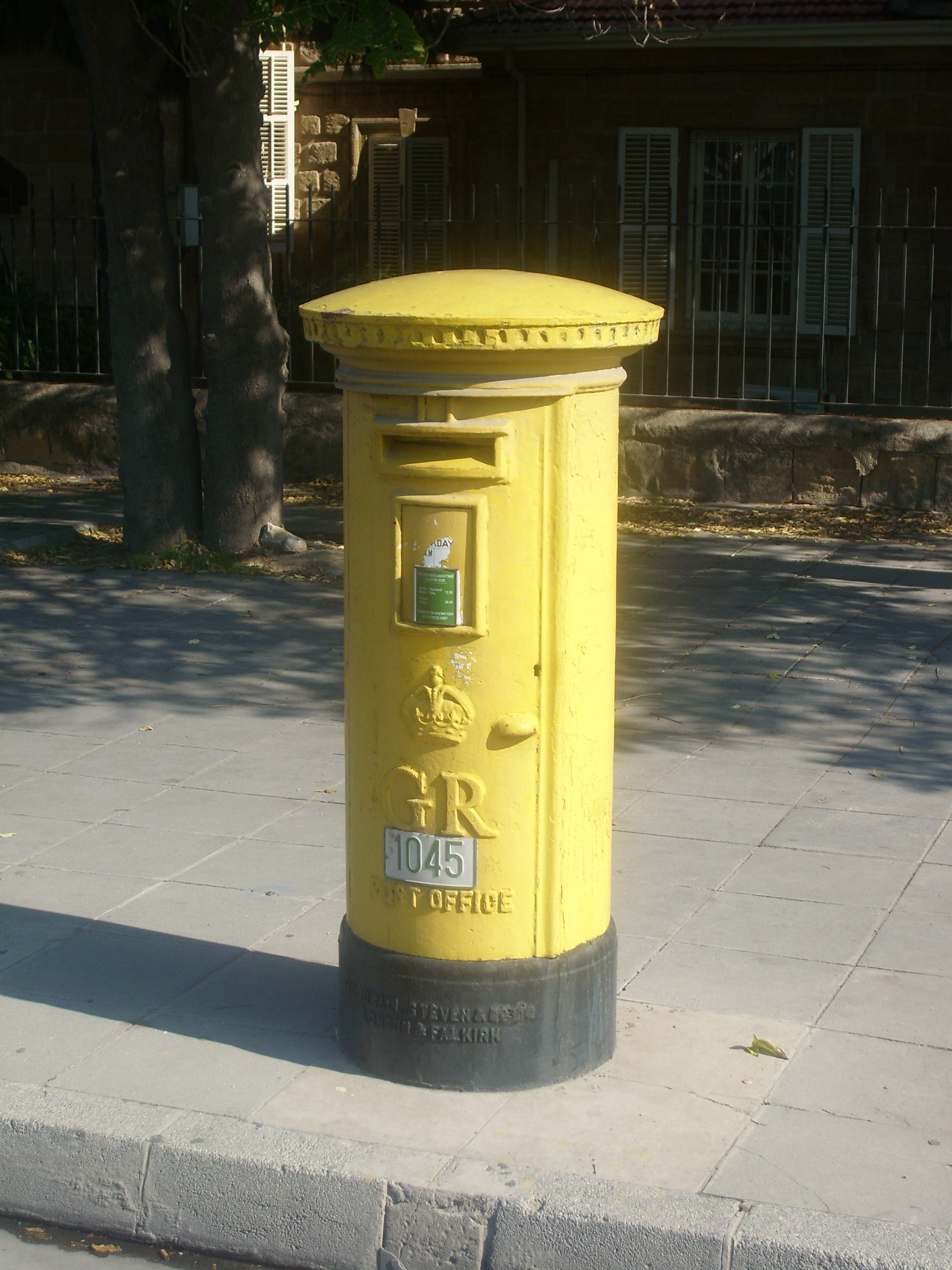
Pillar boxes in Cyprus were painted yellow after independence, and are still in use

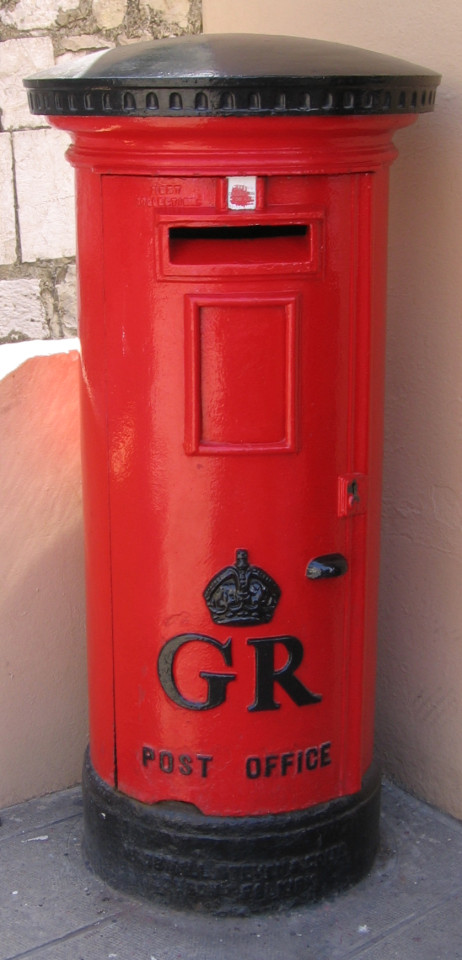
George V pillar box in Gibraltar

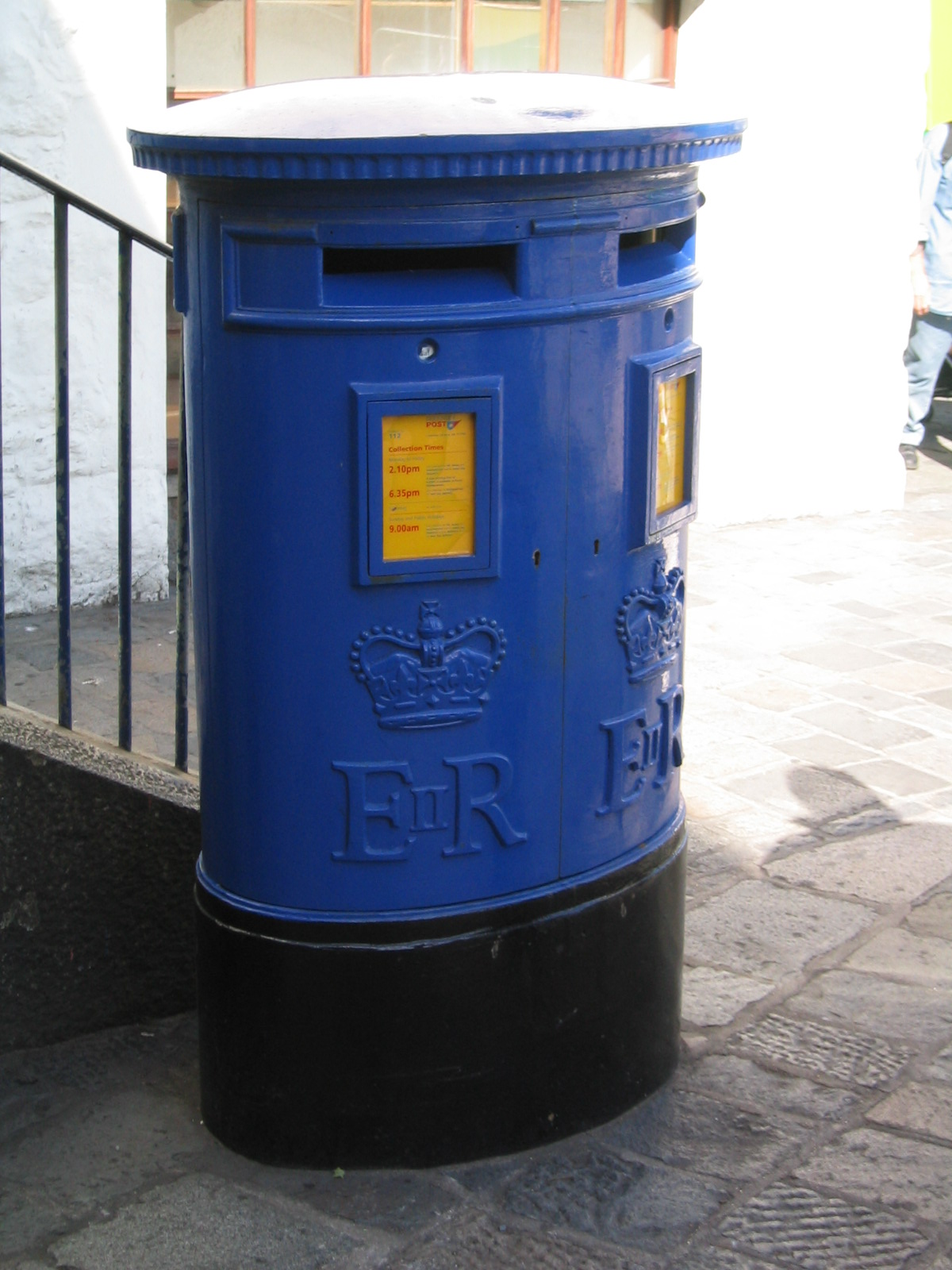
A Guernsey Post Elizabeth II Type C double pillar box

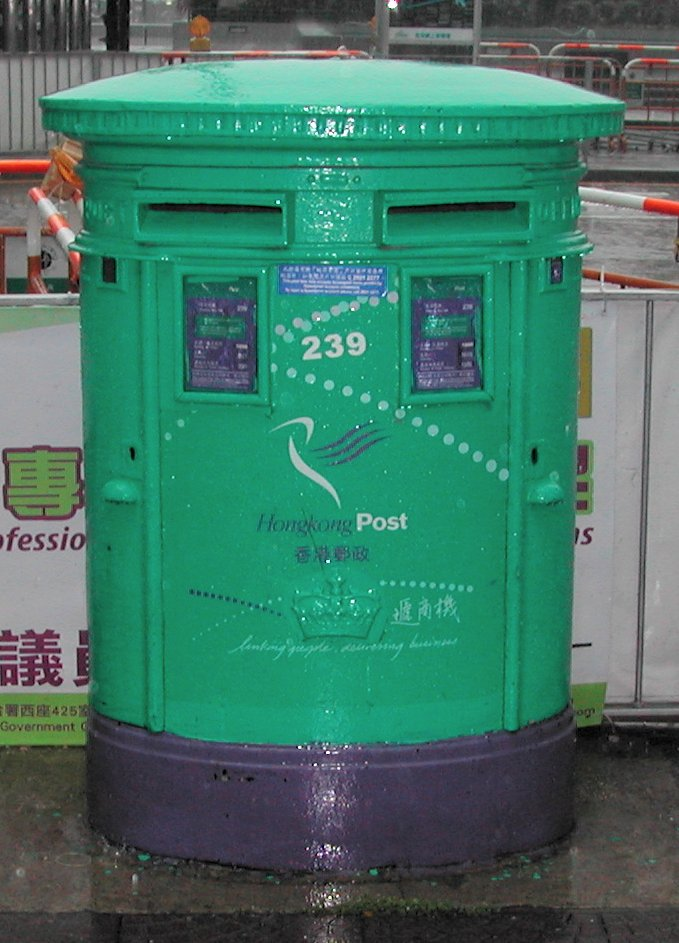
Colonial-era post box in Hong Kong, a Scottish Crown Type C in Central

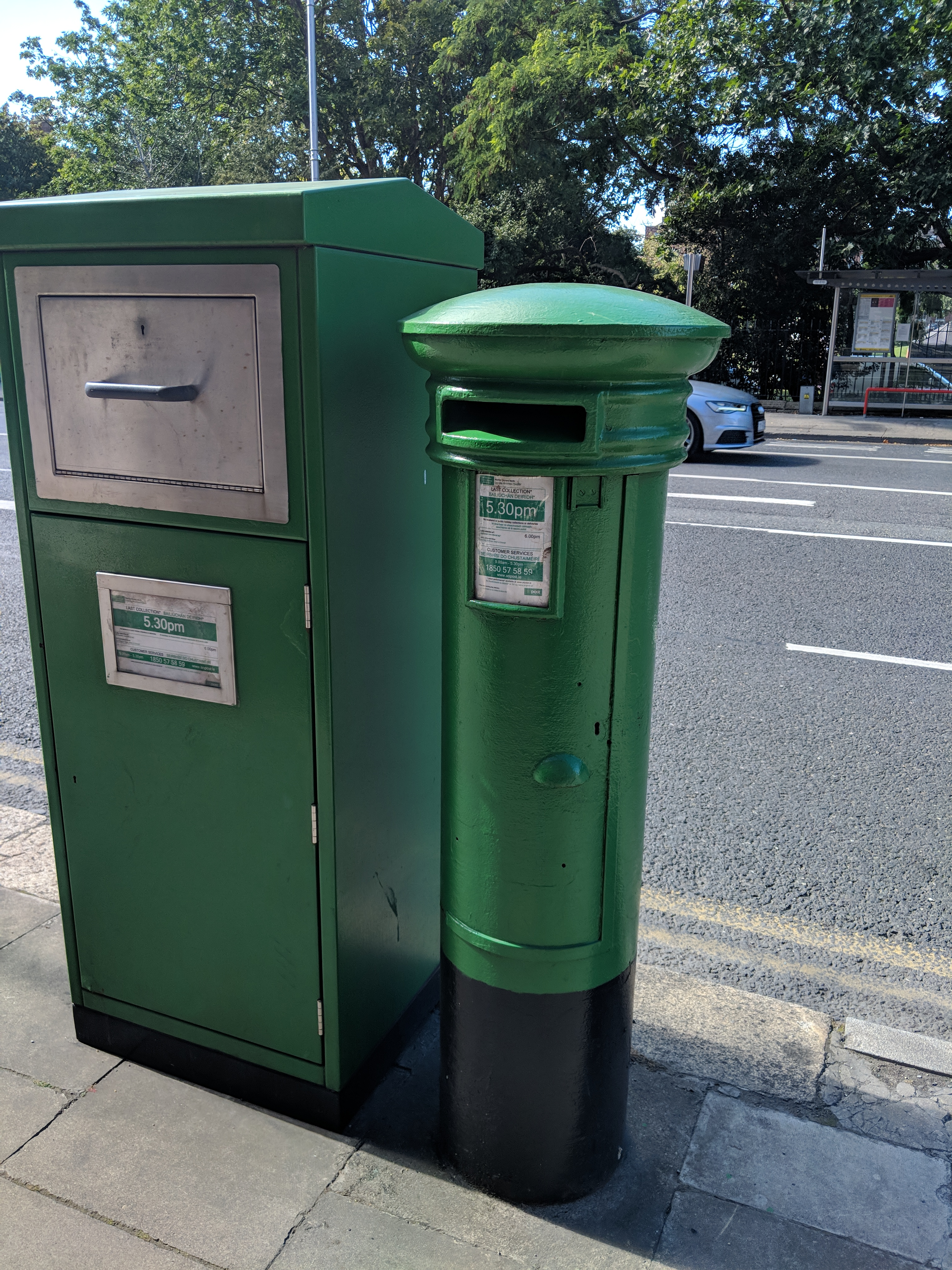
A modern pillar box in Dublin, Ireland

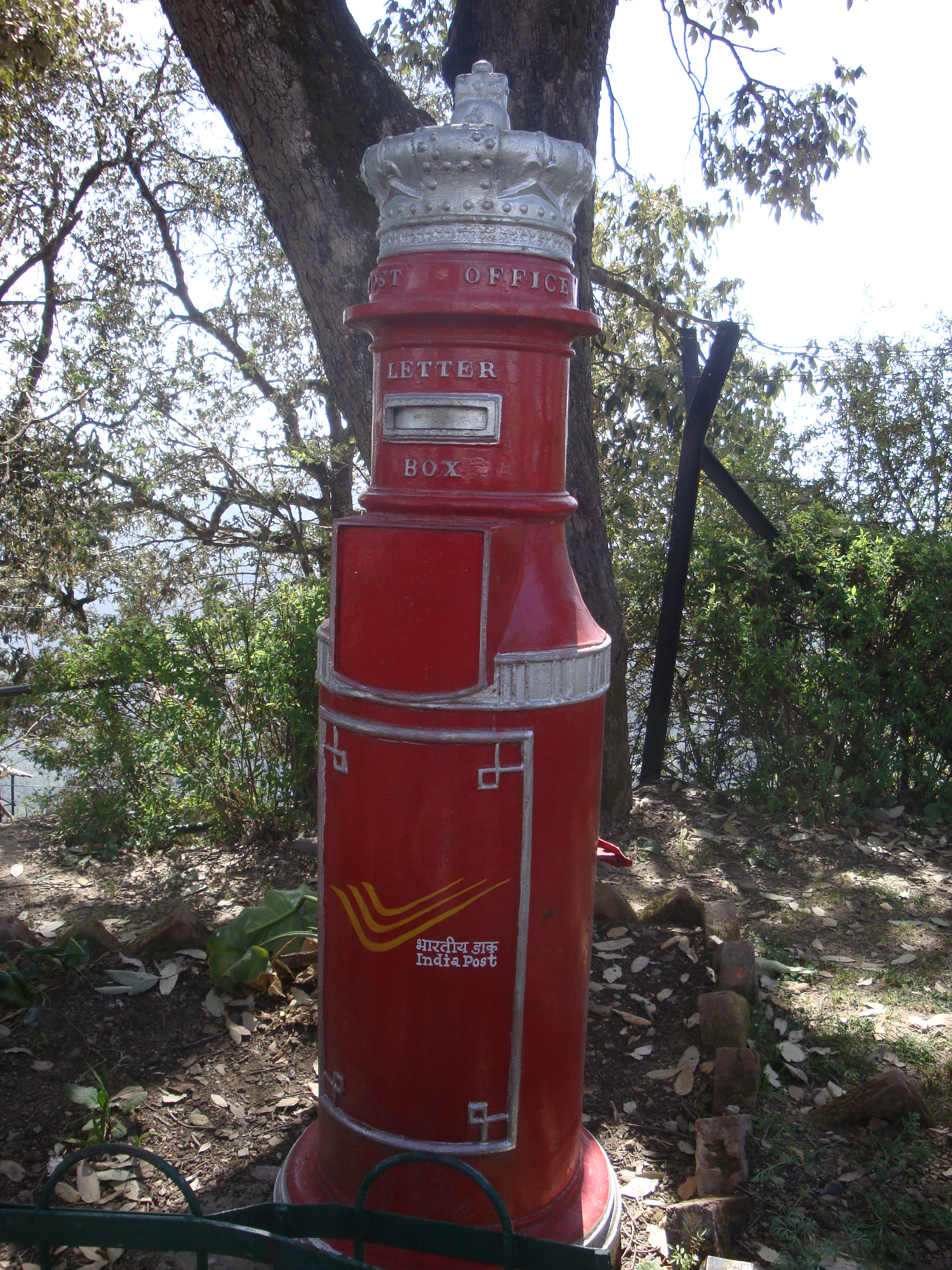
Pillar box in Shimla, India, of a design pioneered by Suttie & Co of Greenock, Scotland

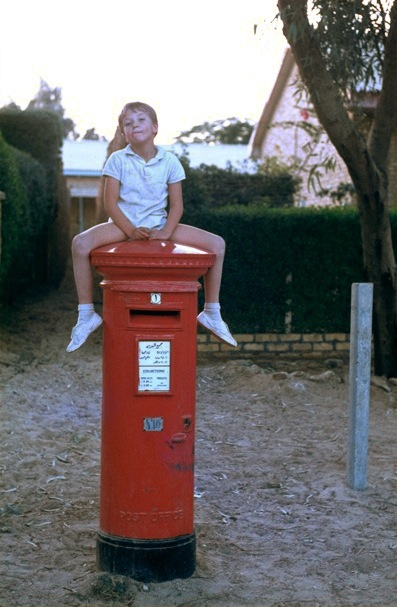
Last red pillar box in Al Ahmadi, Kuwait, about 1976

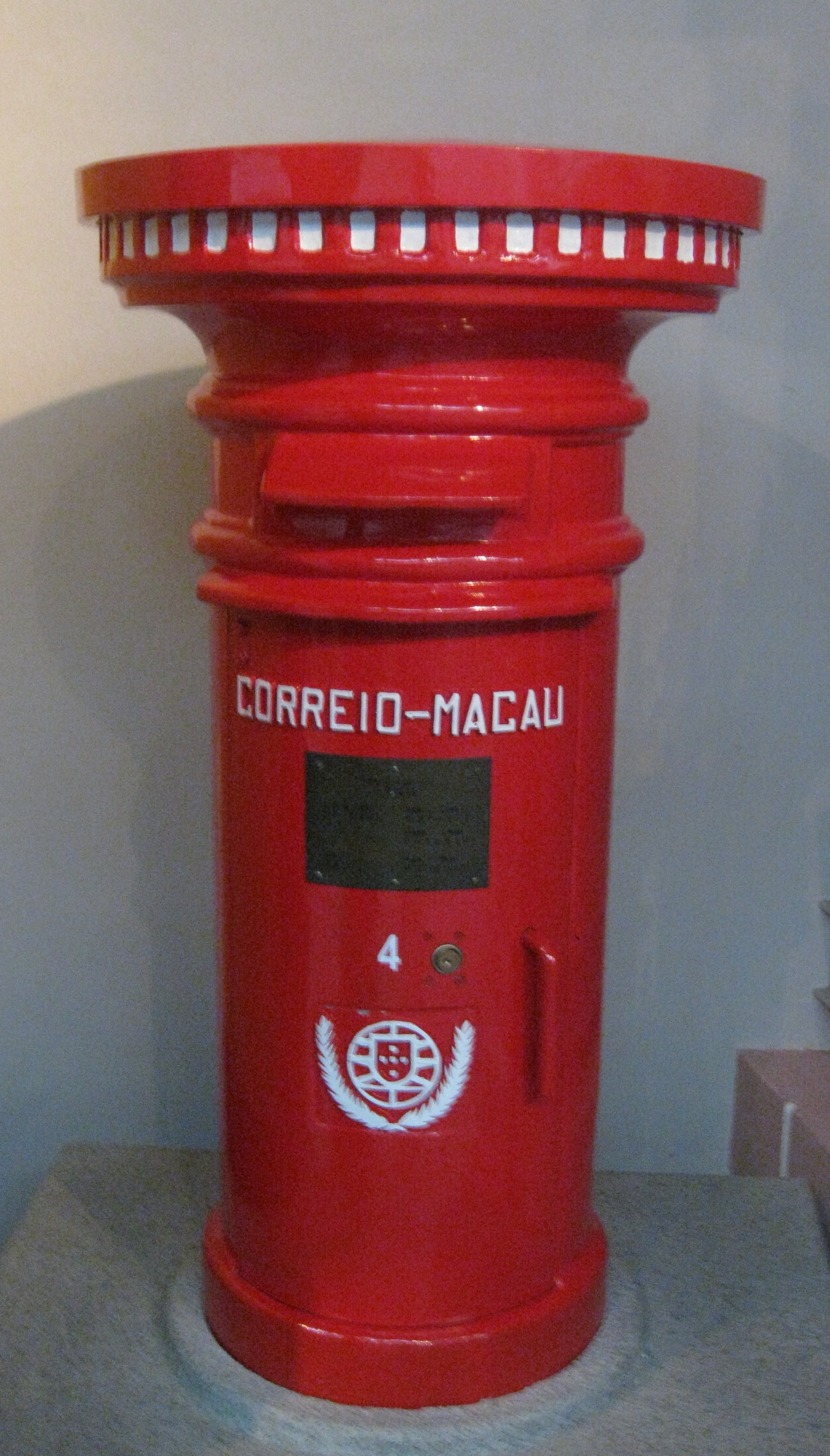
Macanese pillar box from the Portuguese colonial era in the Museum of Macau

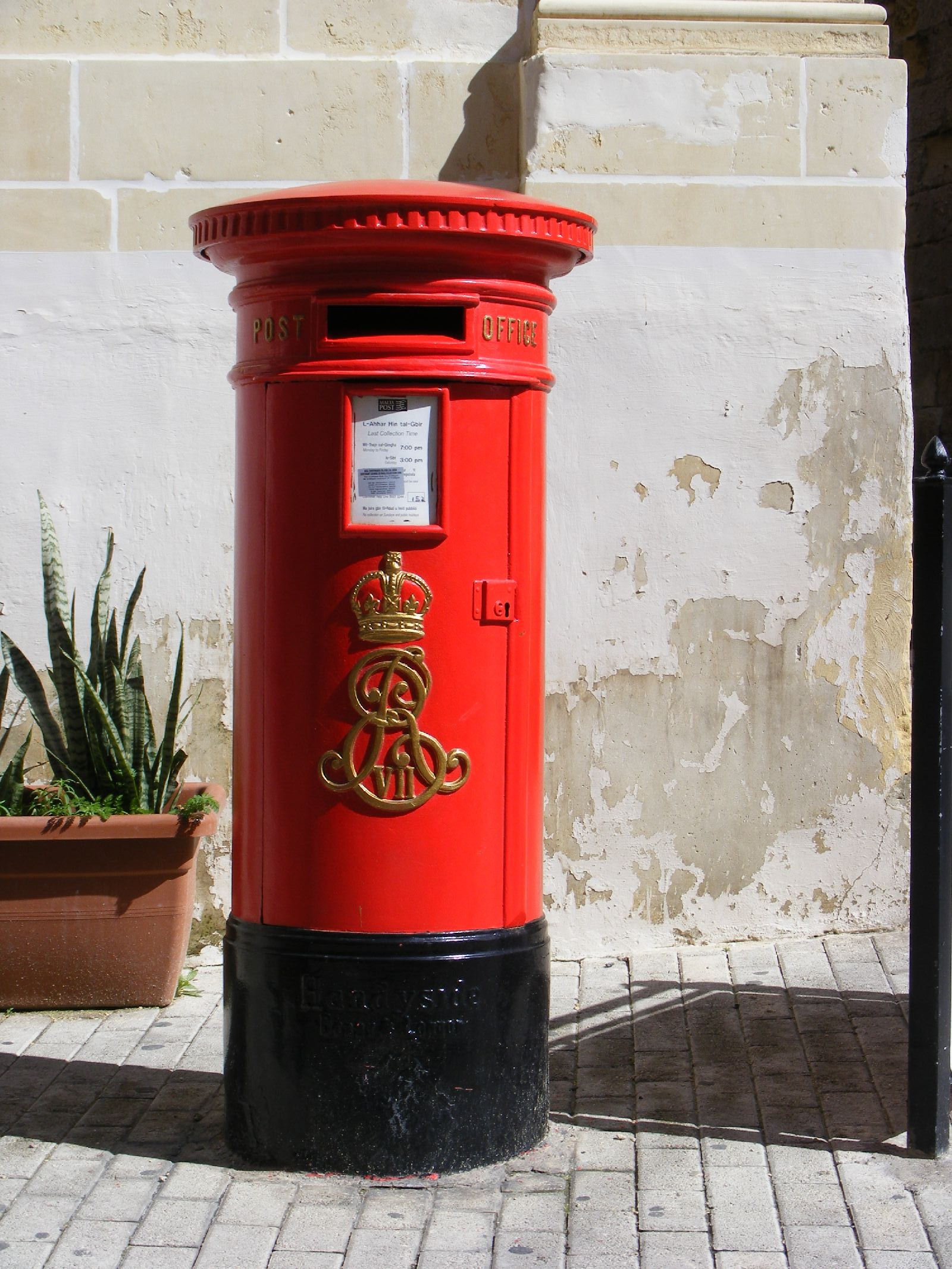
A red pillar box in Vittoriosa, Malta. In the 1980s, royal cyphers were ground off the pillar boxes in Valletta and Floriana, but most others remained intact.

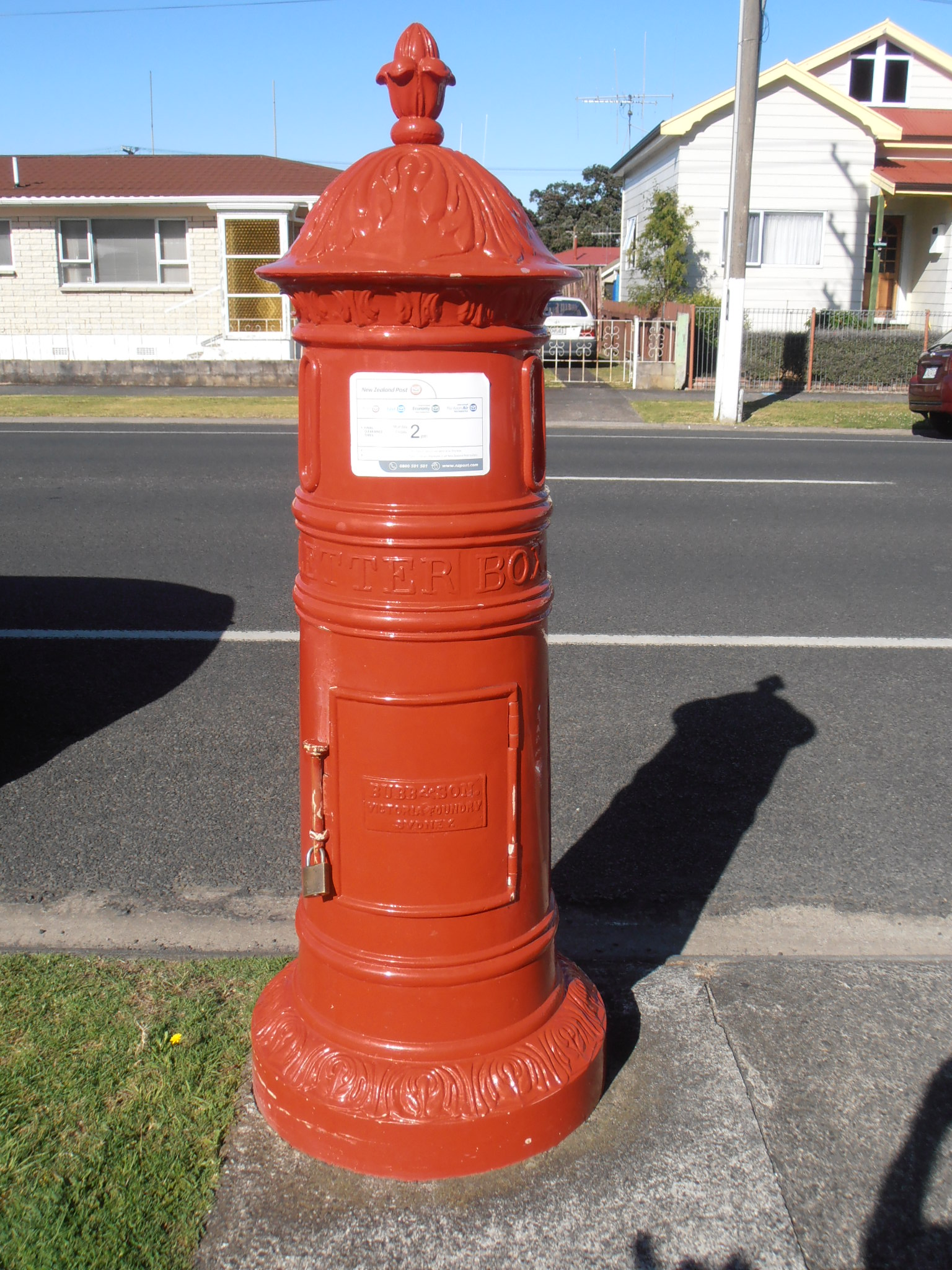
Early pillar box in Thames, New Zealand

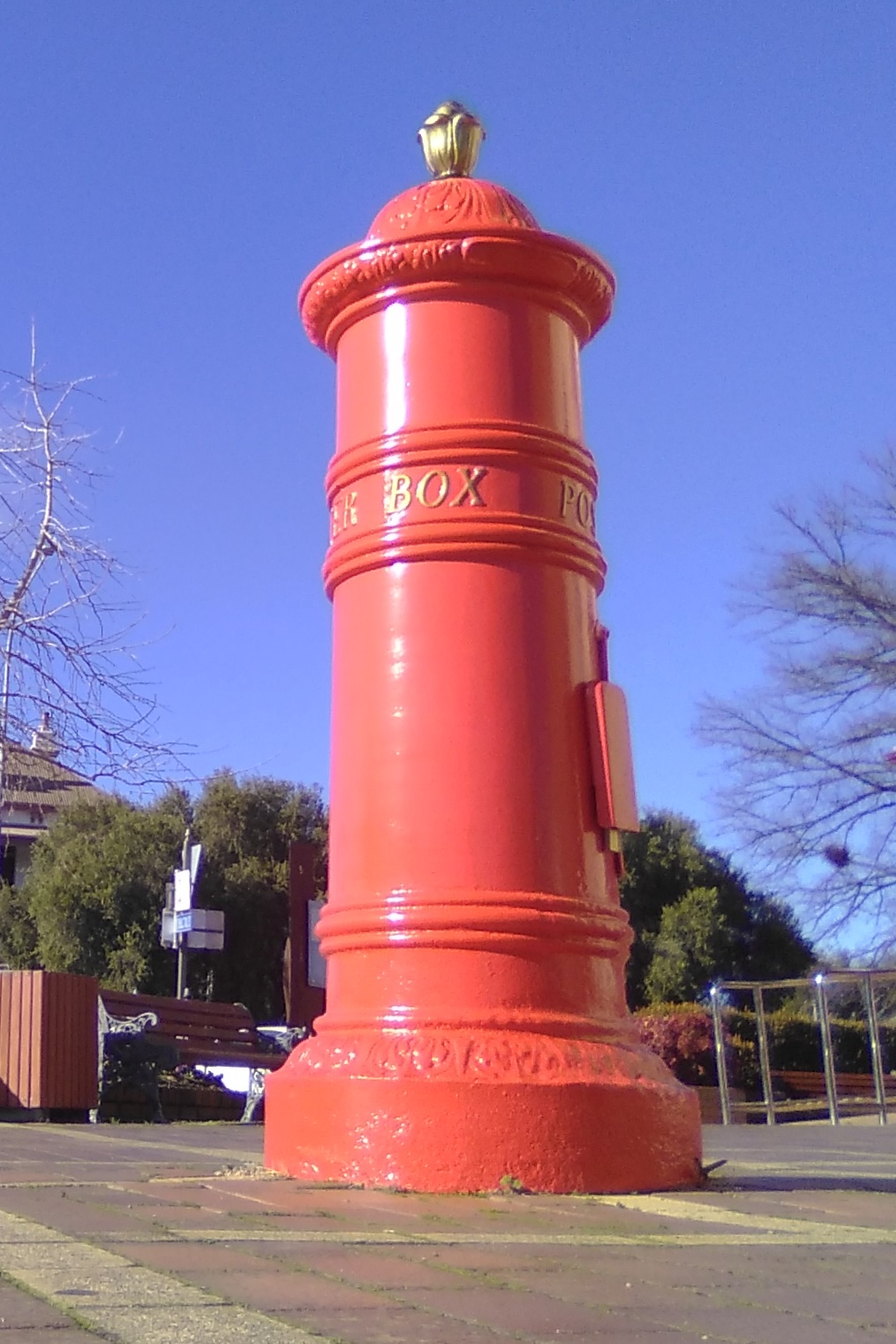
Outside PO, Cootamundra, Australia

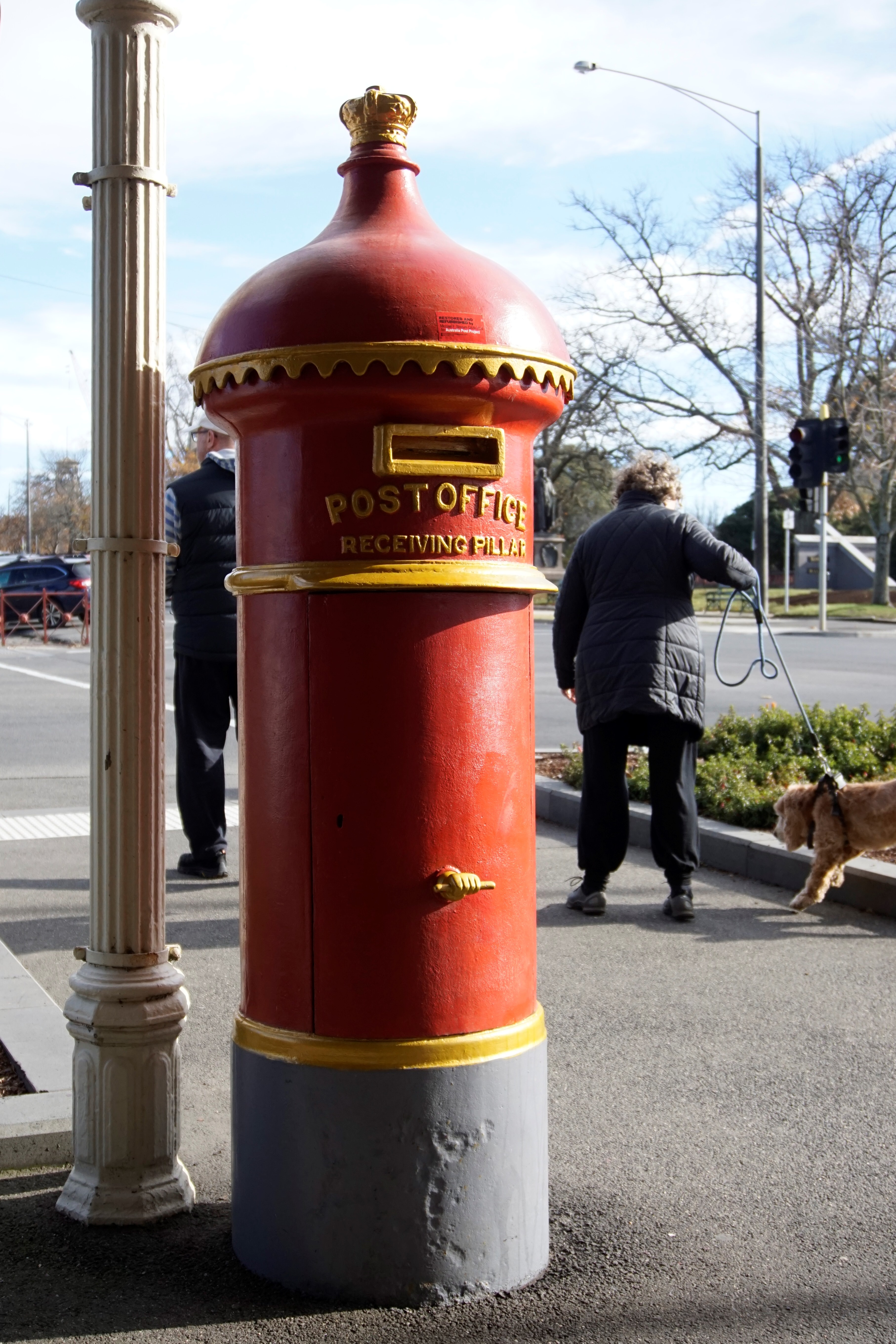
On street corner, Ballarat, Australia

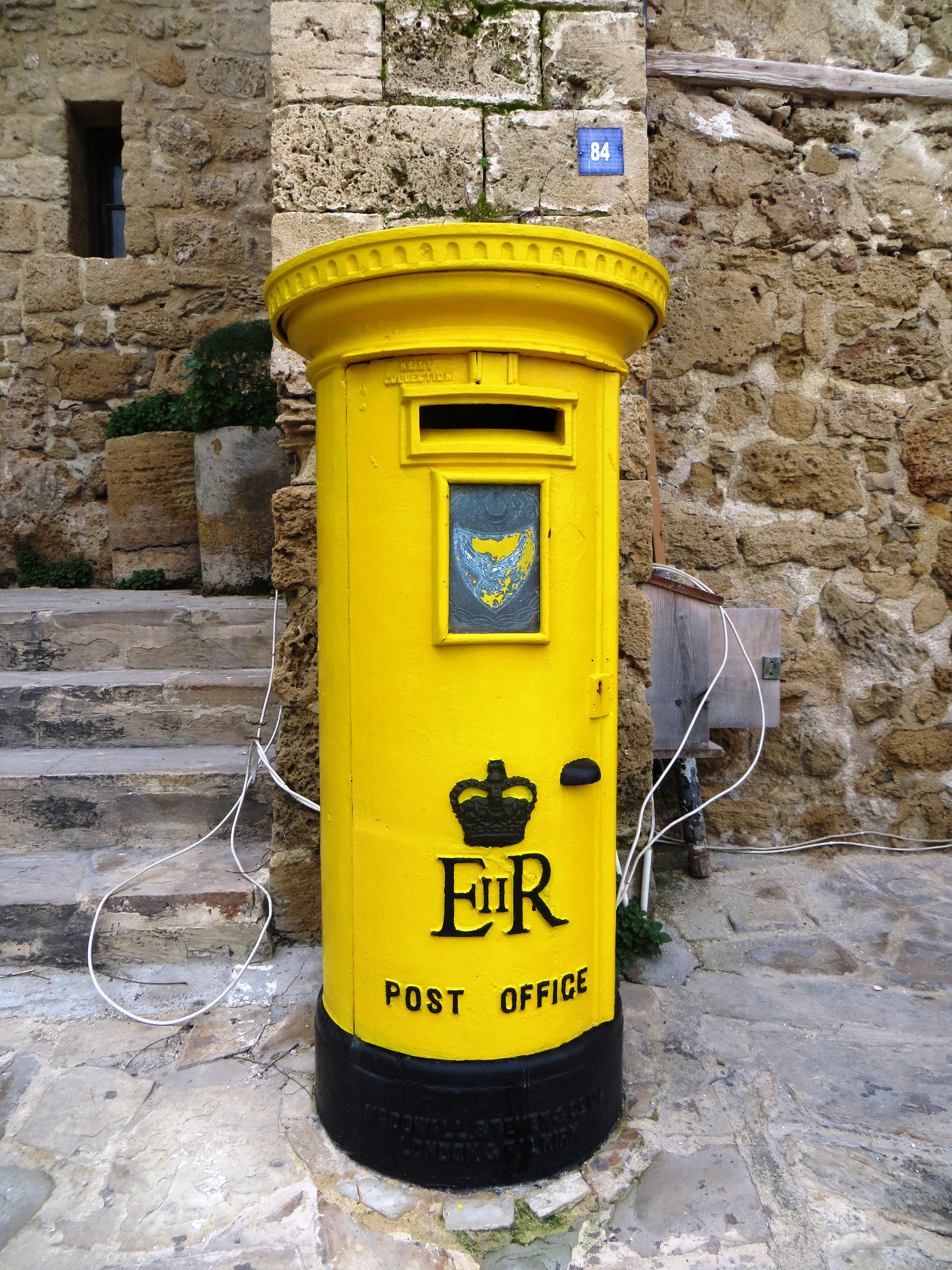
Elizabeth II pillar box in Cyprus (north)

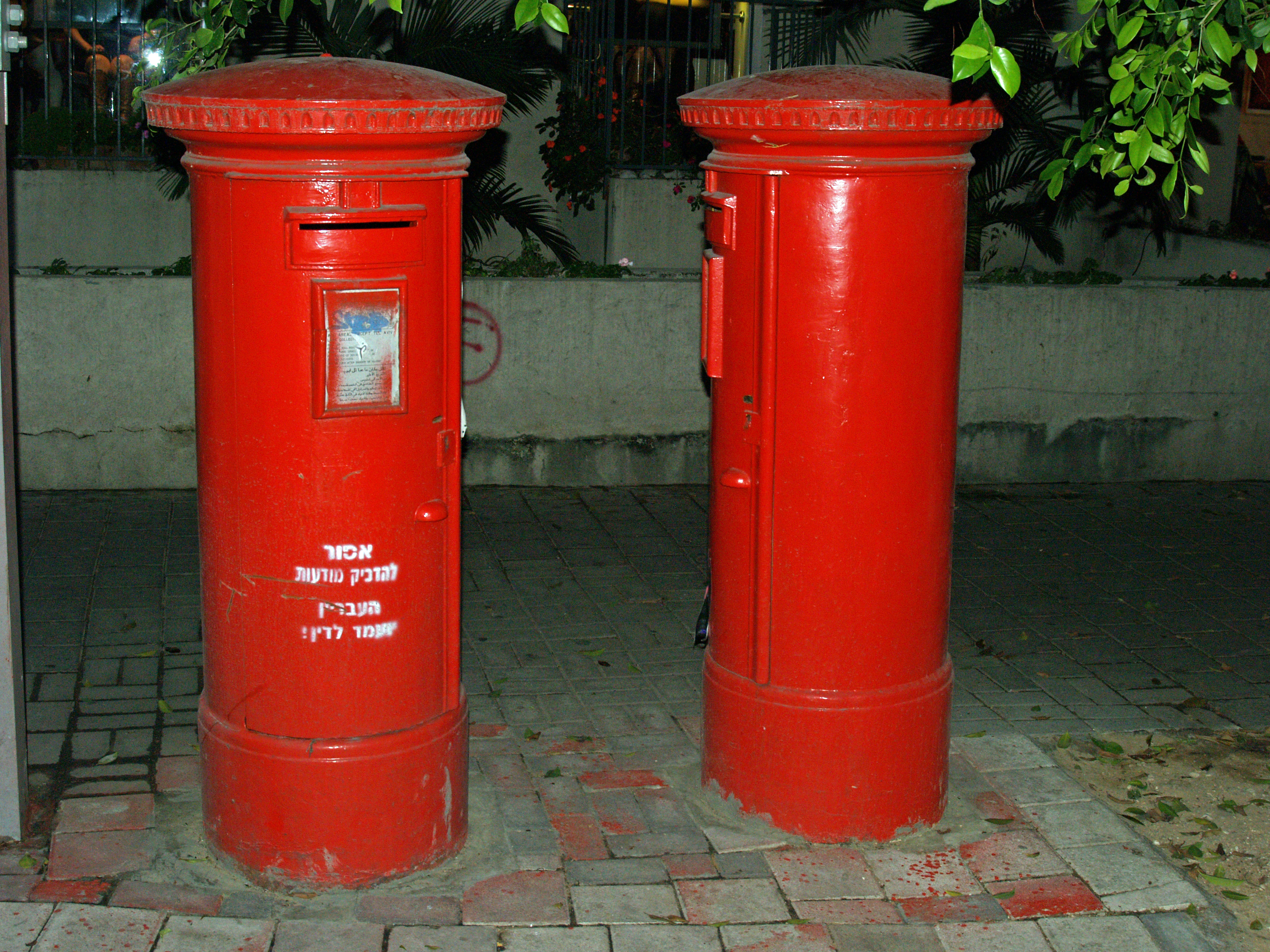
British postboxes in old Tel Aviv, Israel, are a remnant of the Palestine Mandate. The British royal cyphers were ground off the cast-iron doors after the 1948 Arab–Israeli War

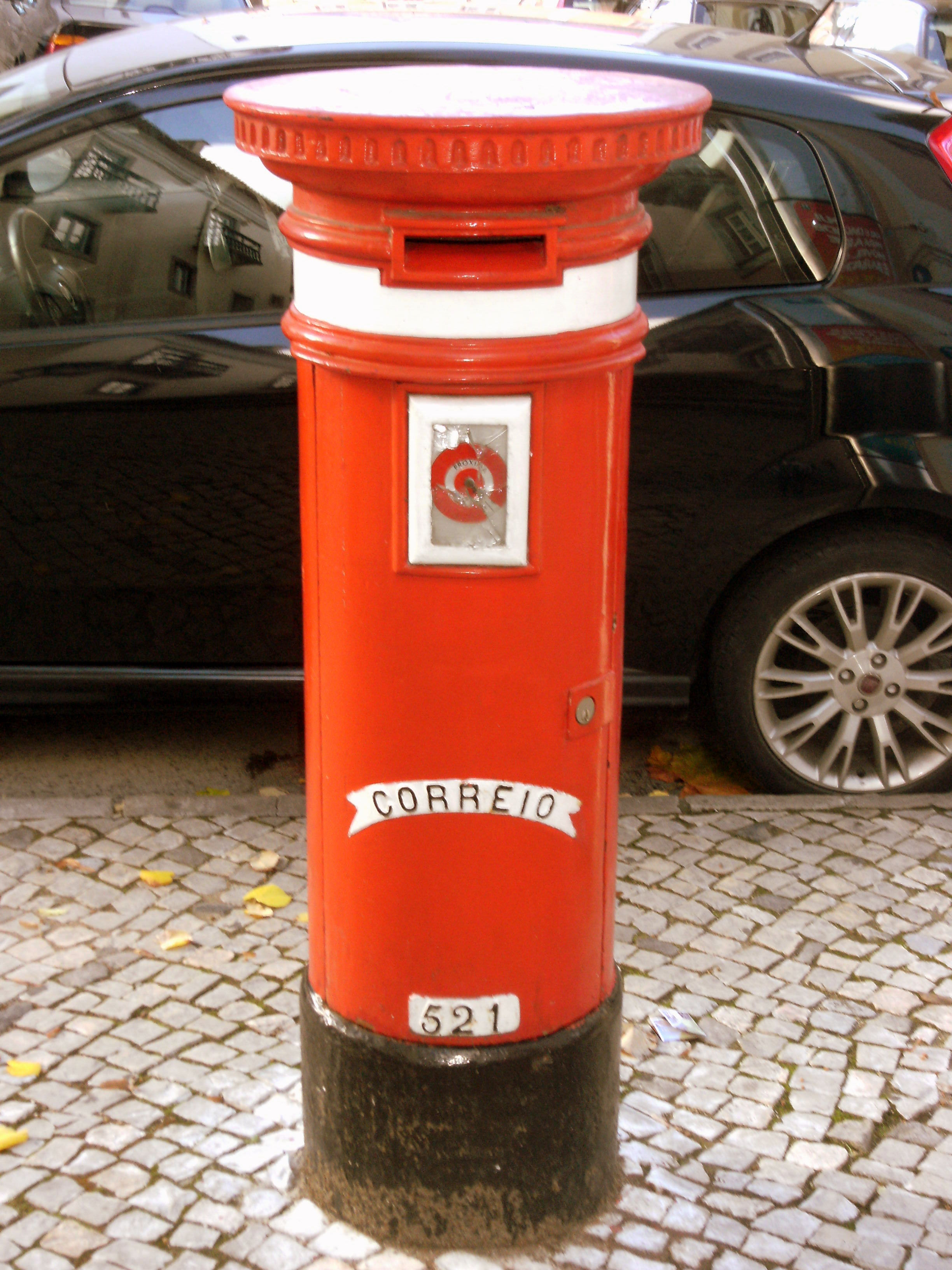
British-made "high-aperture" box in Sintra, Portugal

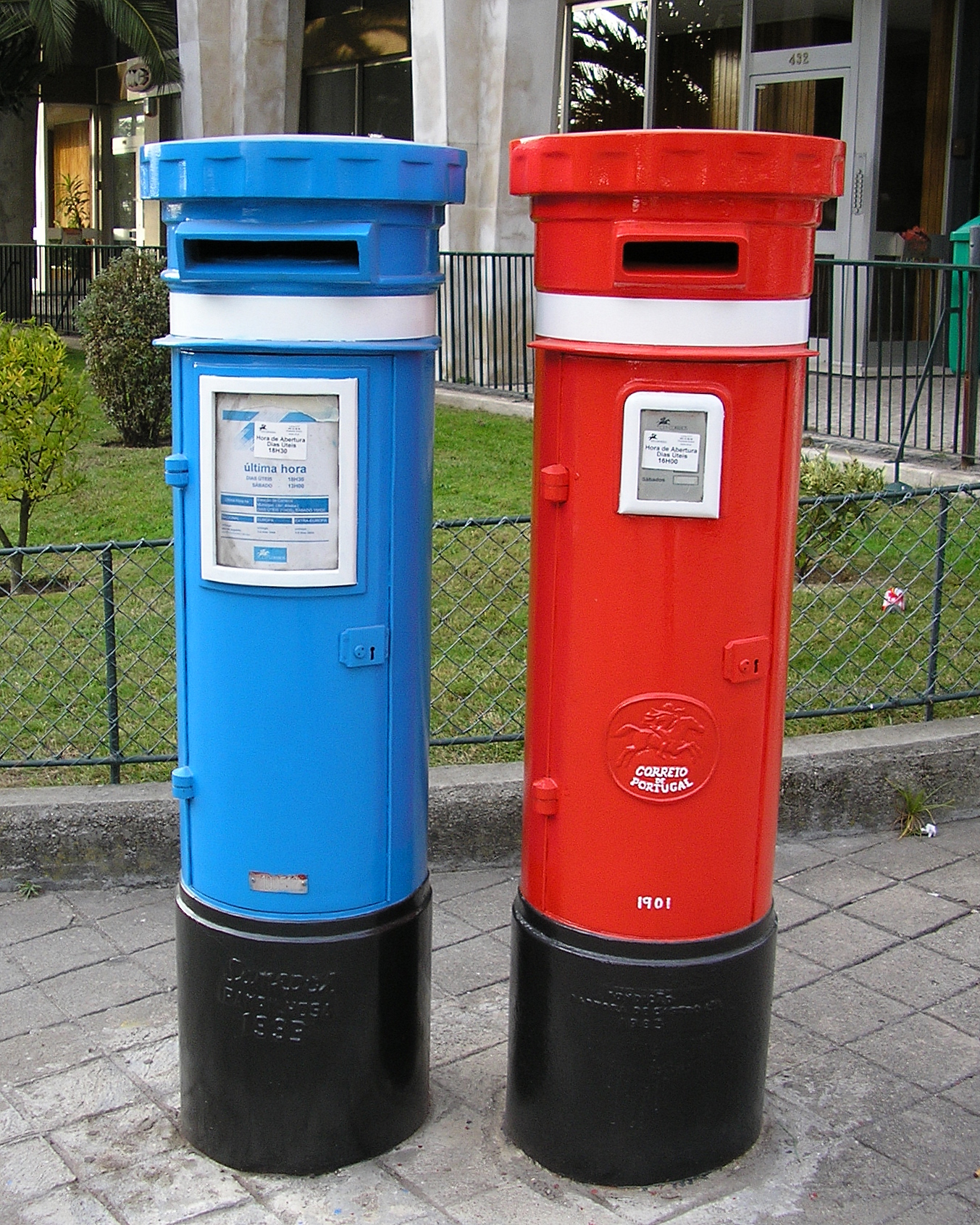
Two variations of Portuguese pillar boxes in Porto, Portugal

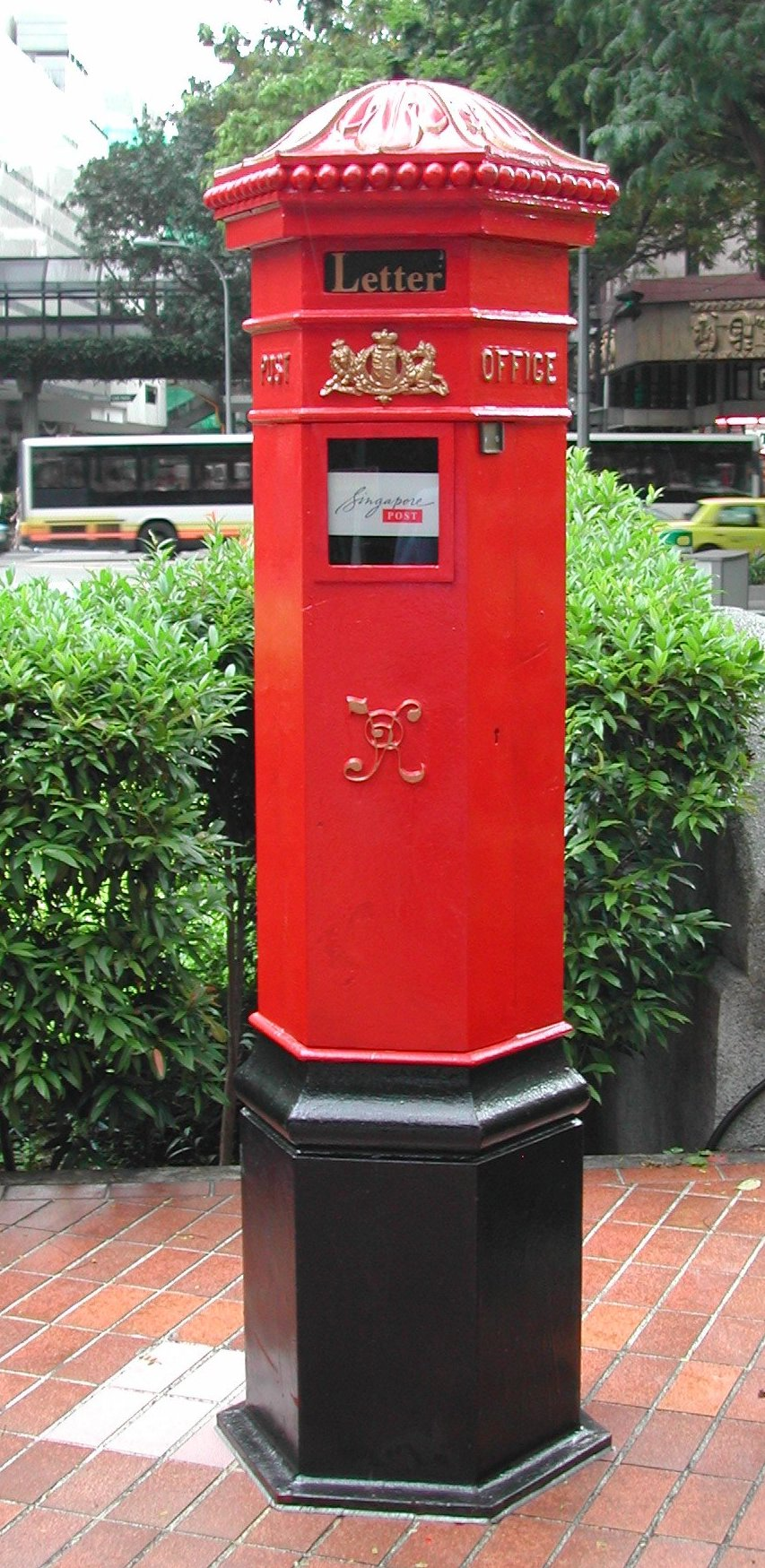
Replica Penfold in Singapore for collecting special Christmas post

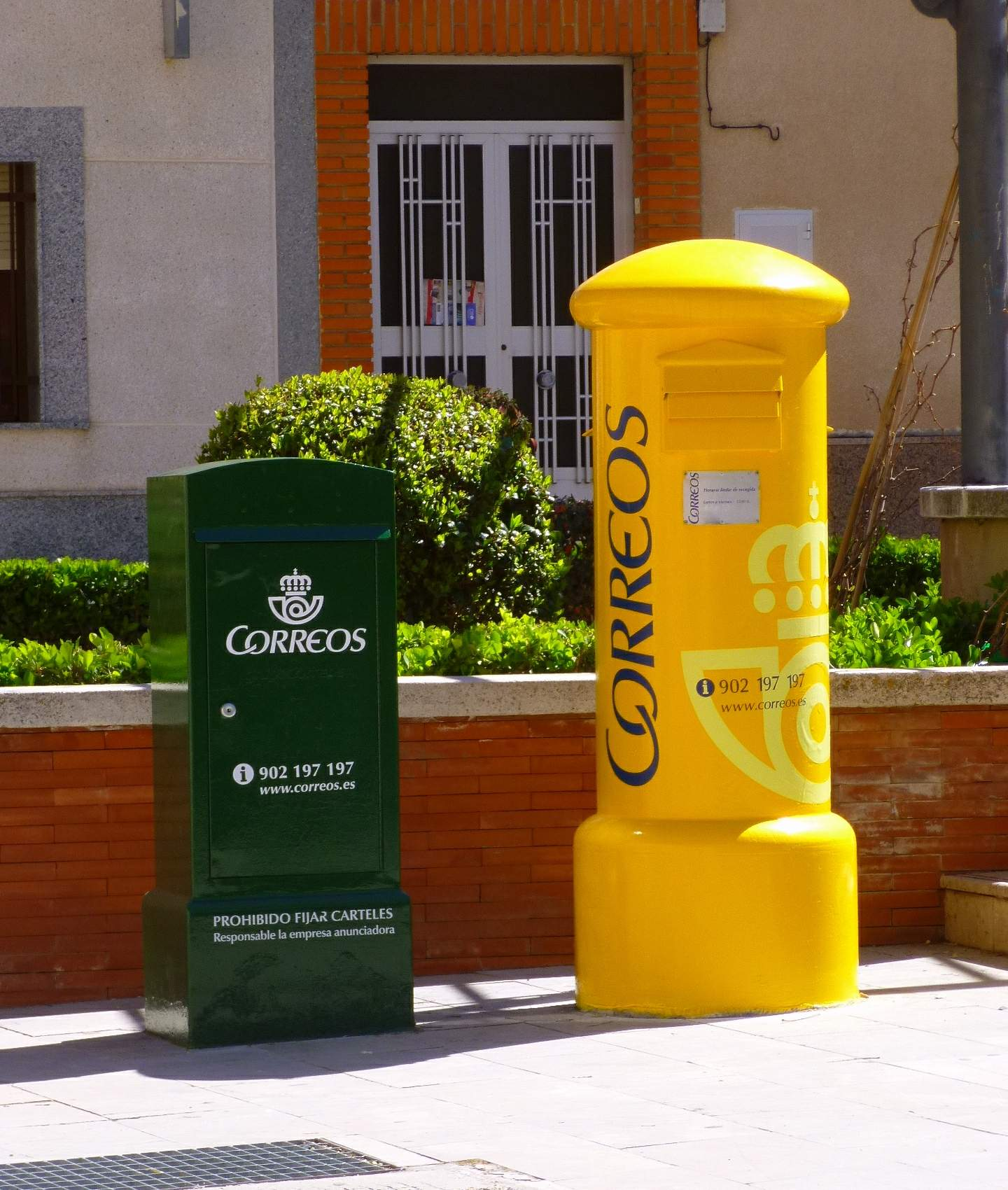
Post box in Spain

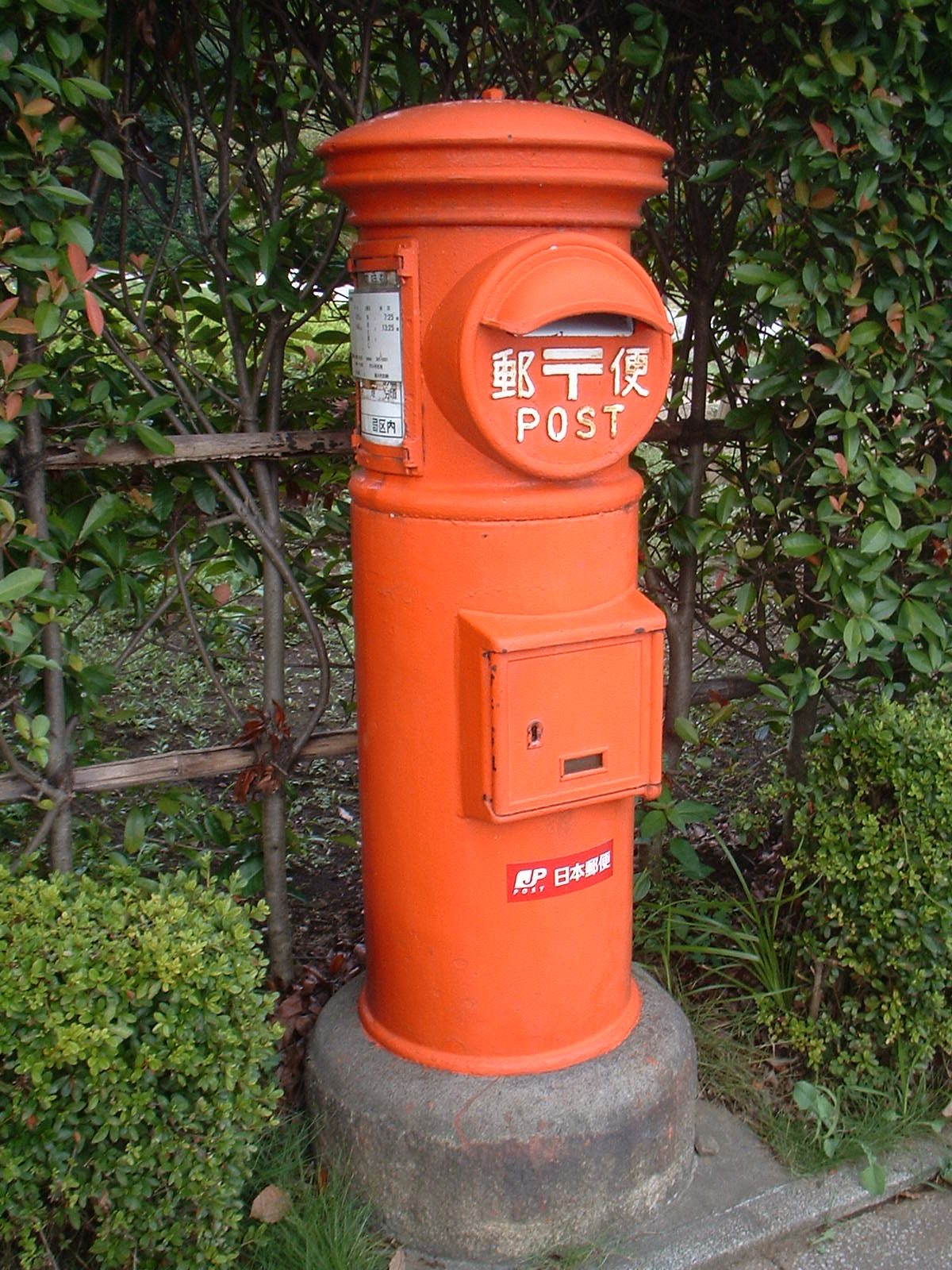
Maru ("Round") Post Japan

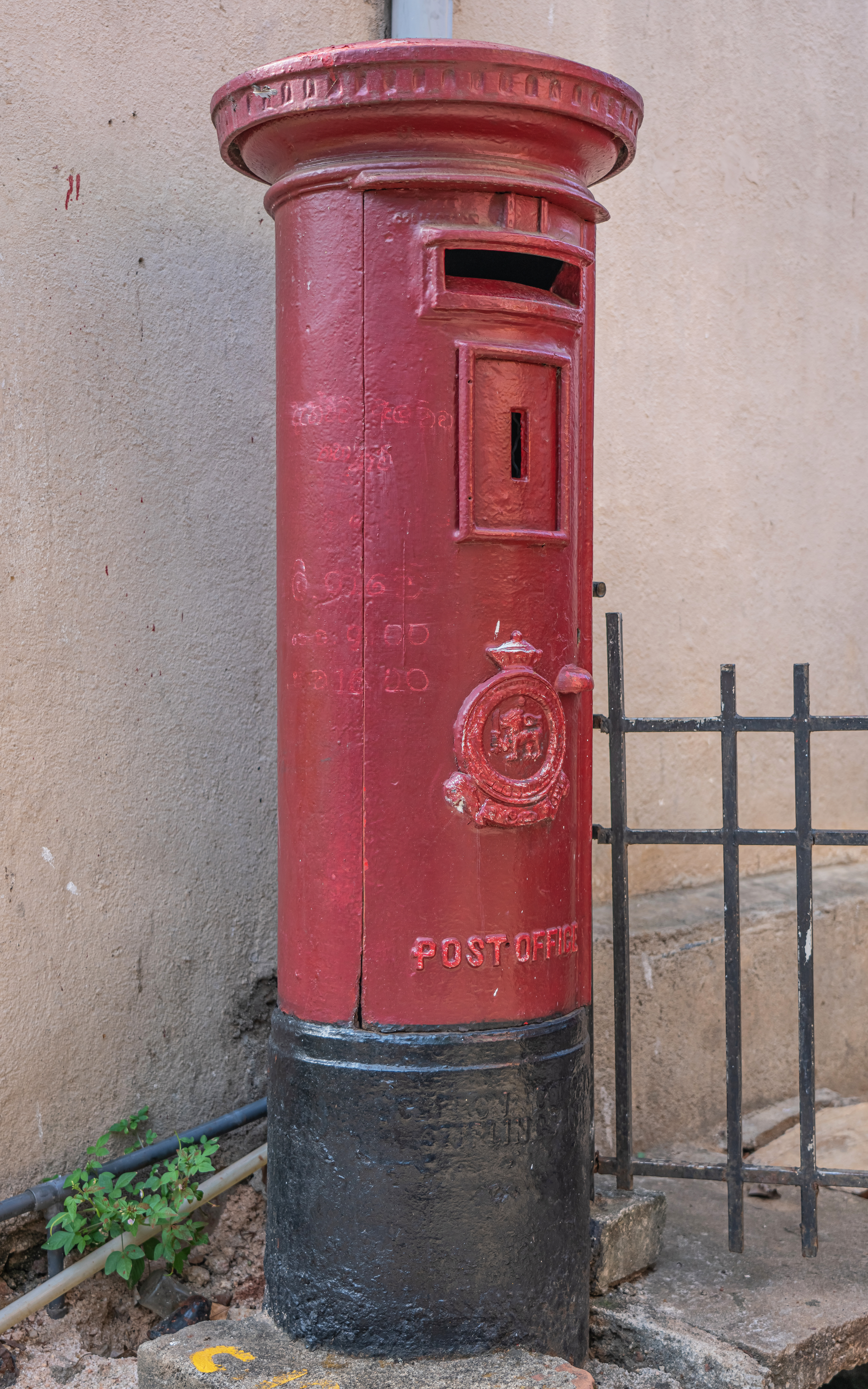
Pillar box in Kandy, Sri Lanka

== Clearance ==
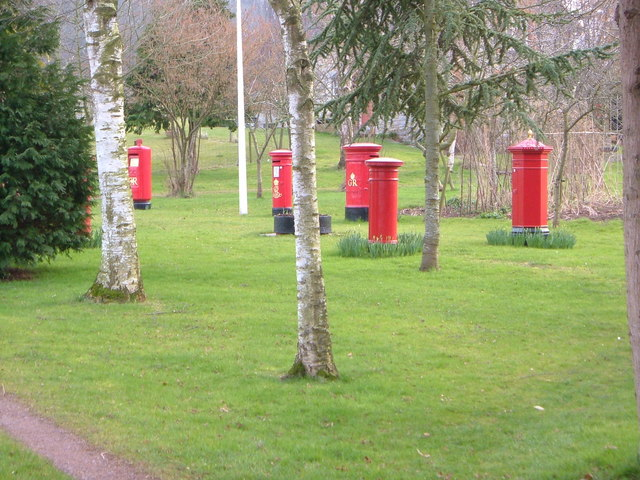
Collection of British pillar boxes at the Inkpen Post Box Museum, near Taunton, Somerset – since moved to Oakham Treasures, Gordano, Bristol, UK

Post boxes are emptied ("cleared") at times usually listed on the box in a TOC (Times of Collection) plate affixed to the box.

Since 2005, most British post boxes have had the time of only the last collection of the day listed on the box, with no indication of whether the box is cleared at other times earlier in the day. The reason given for this by the Royal Mail is that they needed to increase the font size of the wording on the "plate" listing the collection times to improve legibility for those with poor sight and that consequently there was insufficient room for listing all collection times throughout the day. The "Next Collection" tablet, where fitted, was usually retained in these cases, but tablets now merely show the day of the week, indicating whether or not the last collection has been cleared that day.

== See also ==
- 2012 Olympics gold post boxes in the United Kingdom
- Ludlow style wall box
- Pouch box

== References and sources ==
=== General and cited references ===
- Farrugia, Jean Young (1969). The Letter Box: a history of Post Office pillar and wall boxes. Fontwell: Centaur Press. ISBN 0-900000-14-7.
- Proud, Edward B. (1991). The Postal History of British Air Mails. Heathfield: Proud-Bailey Co. Ltd. ISBN 1-872465-72-2.
- Reynolds, Mairead (1983). A History of The Irish Post Office. Dublin: MacDonnell Whyte. ISBN 0-9502619-7-1.
- Robinson, Martin (2000). Old Letter Boxes. Princes Risborough: Shire Publications. ISBN 0-7478-0446-X.
- Warren, Brian; Williams, Chris (2000). Republic of Ireland Letter Box Listing. Letter Box Study Group.
- Wilmut, Roger, ed. (1989). The Complete Monty Python's Flying Circus: All the Words. Vol. 2. New York: Pantheon Books. pp. 311–326. ISBN 0-679-72648-9.
