= RHS Garden Bridgewater =

Public garden in Greater Manchester, England

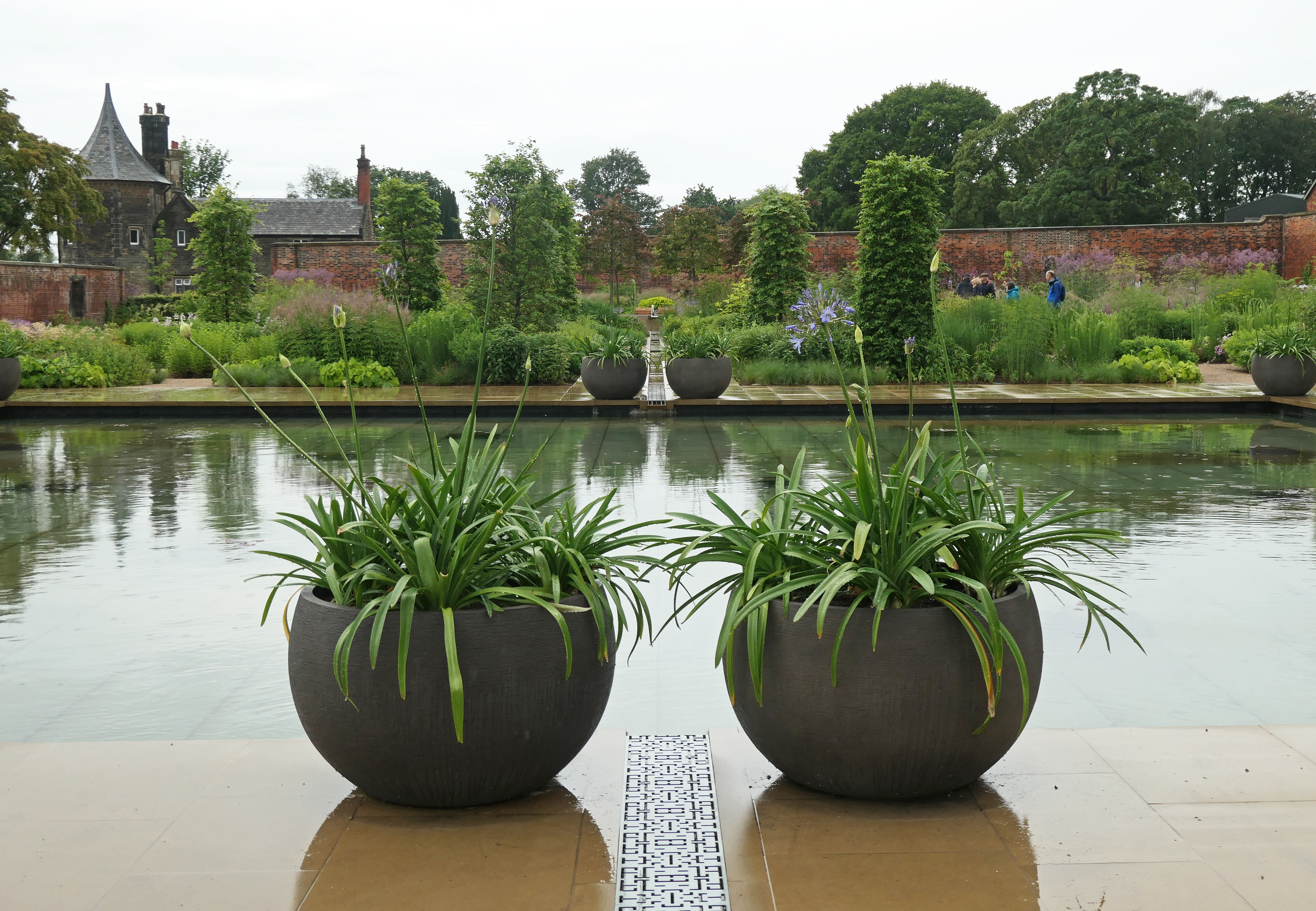
- The Weston walled garden

- Location within Greater Manchester
- Type: Garden
- Location: Worsley New Hall
- Nearest city: Salford, England
- Coordinates: 53°29′59″N 2°24′01″W
- Area: 154 acres (62 ha)
- Created: 2020
- Operator: Royal Horticultural Society
- Visitors: 579,010 in 2025
- Open: 18 May 2021

RHS Garden Bridgewater is the Royal Horticultural Society's fifth public display garden. It is located in the village of Worsley in Salford, Greater Manchester, England.

== Gardens ==
Bridgewater Gardens has been created in 154 acres (62 ha) of the former Worsley New Hall estate, with the Bridgewater Canal forming the southern boundary. It is the RHS's first new garden since it acquired Harlow Carr in North Yorkshire in 2001, and was one of Europe's largest gardening projects when under construction. It opened to the public in May of 2021 and since then has led the way in developing a unique blend of heritage landscape assets combined with biodiversity initiatives and underpinned with community based outreach programmes. In 2022 the garden was awarded first place in The European Heritage Garden Network's (EHGN) category of 'Best Contemporary Garden in a Heritage Setting'.

Landscape architect Tom Stuart-Smith has created the overall plan, in which the walled kitchen garden will be restored, historic features such as the tree-lined Garden Approach recreated, and the lost terraces reworked. Marcus Chilton-Jones was appointed the first curator of the garden in January 2017 with responsibility for overseeing the horticultural evolution of the new site.

Currently, the garden curates the national collection of edible rhubarb (Rheum x hybridum) at c. 100 cultivars. Plans are in place to add the national collection of gooseberry (Ribes uva-crispa) and blackcurrant (Ribes nigrum) in the future.

Opened in September 2026, the Yangzhou Scholar's garden contains four pavilions dedicated to the Scholarly arts of Music, Chess, Calligraphy and Painting. Designed and built in the Chinese style by Yangzhou City, the China Flower Association and Greater Manchester's Chinese Community, the pavilions surround a large pond. Plants species in the garden represent native Chinese and British plants.

== Funding ==
The expected total cost of the project was £32.7m, of which the RHS invested £15.7m of its own funds and received (by December 2019) a further £12.7m through grants and fundraising, including a £5m grant from the Garfield Weston Foundation and further donations from Salford City Council.

Donations of £1.8 million and £0.5 million were made by The Lee Kai Hung Foundation and The Chinese Streamside Garden Founding Committee. These donations were used for horticultural and landscaping development of The Chinese Streamside Garden which opened in 2026.

== History ==
The BBC filmed a four-part series about the construction process at the garden titled The Great Northern Garden Build, which began broadcasting on BBC Two from 10 May 2021, just before the 18 May 2021 opening date.

In May 2022, the visitors' centre Welcome Building was crowned by the Royal Institute of British Architects as the North West Building of the Year. It was praised for its "sustainable and engaging" design.

A Greener Skills Garden opened in January 2025, designed to teach gardening skills and inspire young people to consider a career in horticulture. There is a garden with a similar role at RHS Wisley.

== See also ==
- List of botanical gardens
- RHS Garden Harlow Carr
- RHS Garden Hyde Hall
- RHS Garden Rosemoor
- RHS Garden Wisley
