= RHS Garden Wisley =

Public garden in Surrey, England

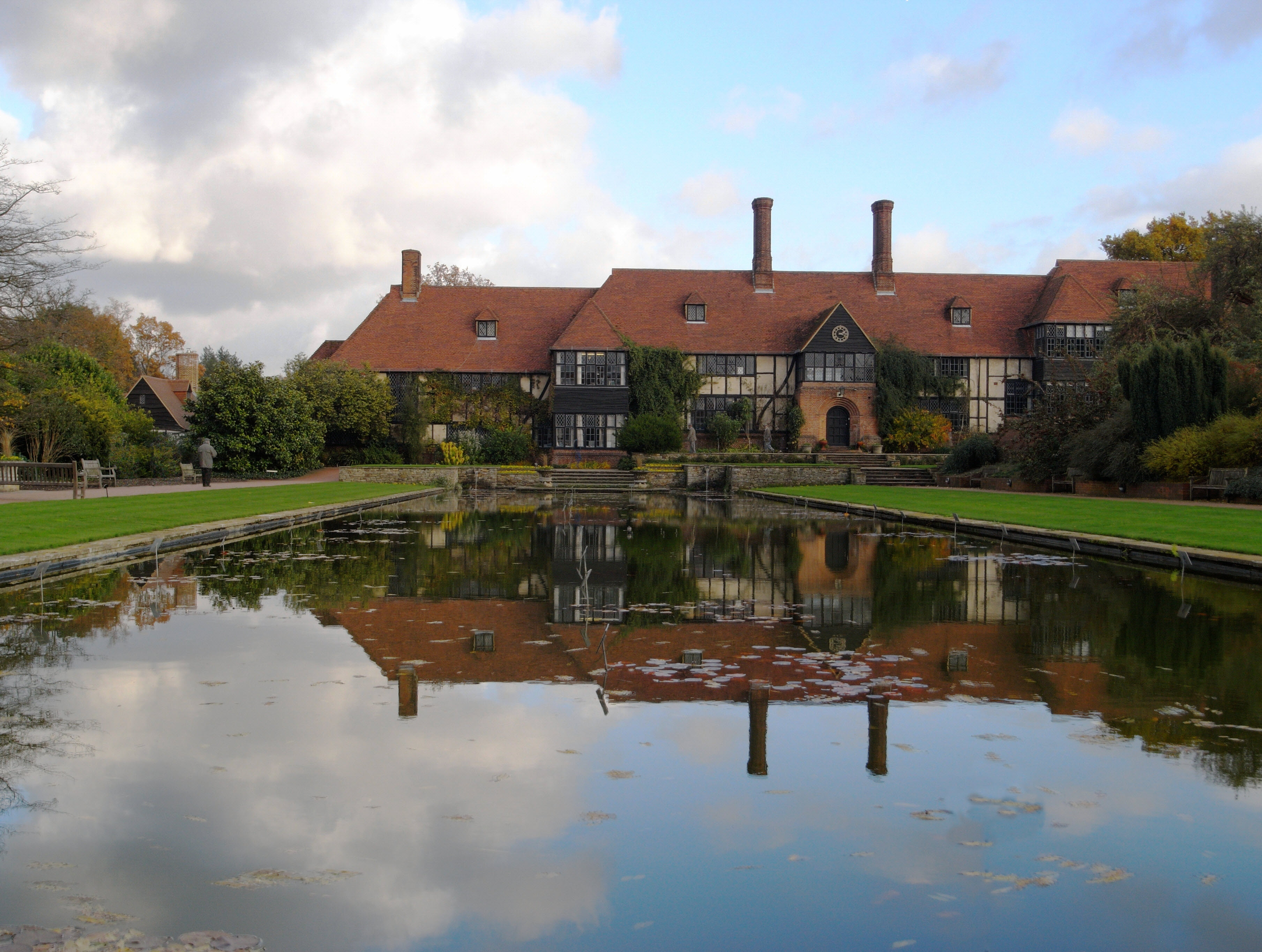
- The laboratory at Wisley Garden with the canal in the foreground

- Location within Surrey
- Type: Garden
- Location: Wisley
- Coordinates: 51°18′47″N 0°28′27″W
- Area: 240 acres (97 ha)
- Created: 1878
- Operator: Royal Horticultural Society
- Visitors: 1,255,706 (2025)
- Open: All year round
- Designation: Grade II*
- Public transit: Whitebus 462, 463; Falcon 714
- Website: RHS Wisley

RHS Garden Wisley is a garden run by the Royal Horticultural Society in Wisley, Surrey, southwest of London. It is one of five gardens run by the society, the others being Harlow Carr, Hyde Hall, Rosemoor, and Bridgewater (which opened on 18 May 2021). Wisley is the second most visited paid entry garden in the United Kingdom after the Royal Botanic Gardens, Kew, with 1,255,706 visitors in 2025. The gardens are Grade II* listed.

== Location ==
The gardens are accessed from Wisley Lane which connects to the A3 just south of Junction 10 on the M25 motorway. The River Wey forms the north-western border of the site.

== History ==
Wisley was founded by Victorian businessman and RHS member George Fergusson Wilson, who purchased Glebe Farm, a sixty-acre- (24 ha) site, in 1878. There, with assistance from Gertrude Jekyll, he established the "Oakwood Experimental Garden" on part of the site, where he attempted to "make difficult plants grow successfully". Wilson died in 1902 and Oakwood was purchased by Sir Thomas Hanbury, the creator of the celebrated garden, La Mortola, on the Italian Riviera. He gave the Wisley site to the RHS in 1903. The society sold its lease on its gardens in Chiswick in March of that year and moved to Wisley in the April.

The storms of 1987 and 1990 reduced the original wooded area, leaving only a few mature oak trees.

In April 2005, Alan Titchmarsh cut the turf to mark the start of construction of the Bicentenary Glasshouse. This major new feature covers three-quarters of an acre (0.30 ha) and overlooks a new lake built at the same time. It is divided into three main planting zones representing desert, tropical and temperate climates. It was budgeted at £7.7 million and opened on 26 June 2007. A £20 million Welcome Building including a larger restaurant, cafe and visitor facilities was opened by Alan Titchmarsh on 10 June 2019.

In 2024, the influential gardener Piet Oudolf redeveloped the two-acre space of his Glasshouse Landscape borders, first planned by him 20 years earlier, in a style more designed to mimic the natural world.

Directors have included;

- Frederick Chittenden (1919–1931)
- Robert Lewis Harrow (1931–1946)
- John Gilmour (1946–1951)
- Harold Roy Fletcher (1951–1954)
- Francis Philip Knight (1954–1969)
- Christopher Brickell (1969–1985)
- Peter Joseph Maudsley (1985–1987)
- Philip McMillan Browse

== Description ==
Wisley is now a large and diverse garden covering 240 acres (97 ha). In addition to numerous formal and informal decorative gardens, several glasshouses and an extensive arboretum, it includes a trials field where new cultivars are assessed. The original laboratory, for both scientific research and training, was opened in 1907, but proved inadequate. It was expanded and its exterior was rebuilt during World War I. It was designated a Grade II Listed building in 1985. Visitor numbers increased significantly from 5,250 in 1905, to 11,000 in 1908, 48,000 in the late 1920s, and 170,000 in 1957, and passed 400,000 in 1978, 500,000 in 1985, and 600,000 in 1987.

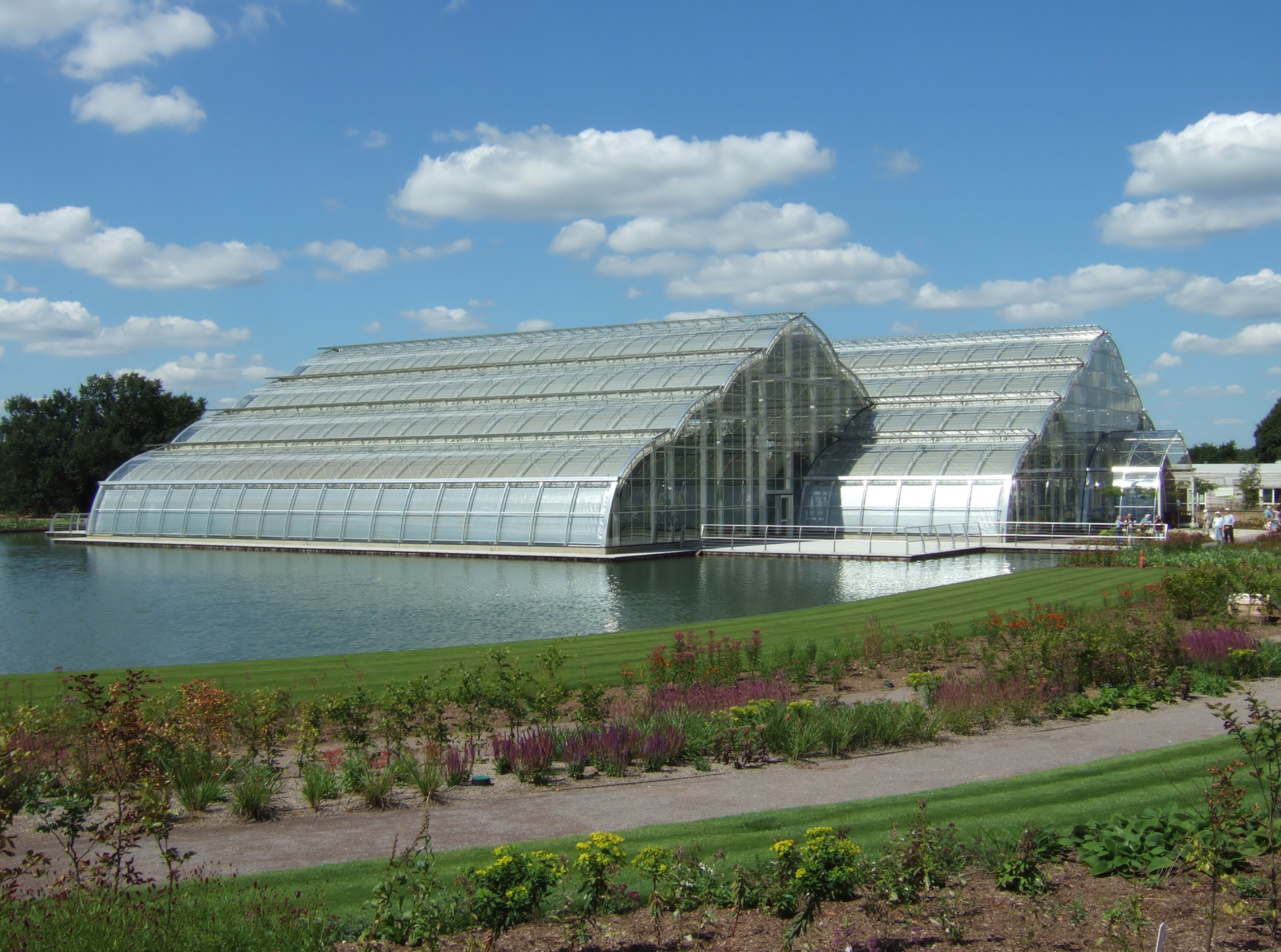
The Wisley Millenium Glasshouse

The grounds contain the following features:

- RHS Hilltop - laboratory, library and event building
- Wildlife Garden, Wellbeing Garden and World Food Garden
- Glasshouse with desert, tropical and temperate climates, and with special topical displays
- Clore Learning Centre
- Alpine houses
- Laboratory
- Library
- Plant information centre
- Trials field, where plants are submitted for trial, allowing some to be awarded the prestigious Award of Garden Merit
- Fruit field, featuring large numbers of apples, pears and other fruit grown in various forms.
- Rock garden and alpine meadow on a sloping site
- Wild garden
- Walled garden
- Jellicoe Canal with water lilies in season
- Battleston Hill, which includes many rhododendrons and azaleas
- Rose borders and mixed borders
- Jubilee arboretum
- Pinetum
- National heather collection

A Greener Skills Garden opened in October 2024, designed to teach gardening skills and inspire young people to consider a career in horticulture.

Visitor facilities include cafés and restaurant, car parks, plant centre, etc.

== Gallery ==
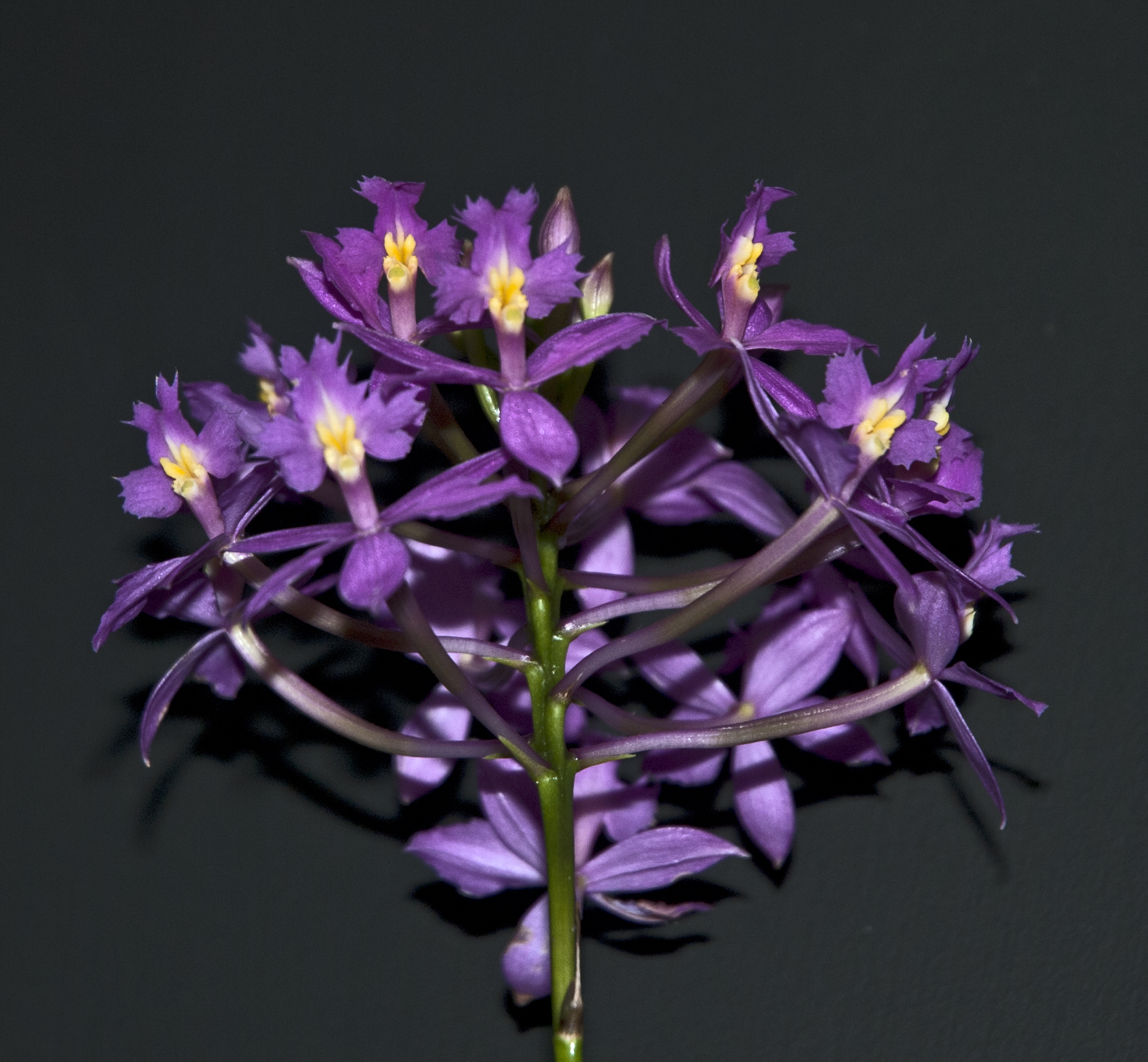
Orchid in the glasshouse

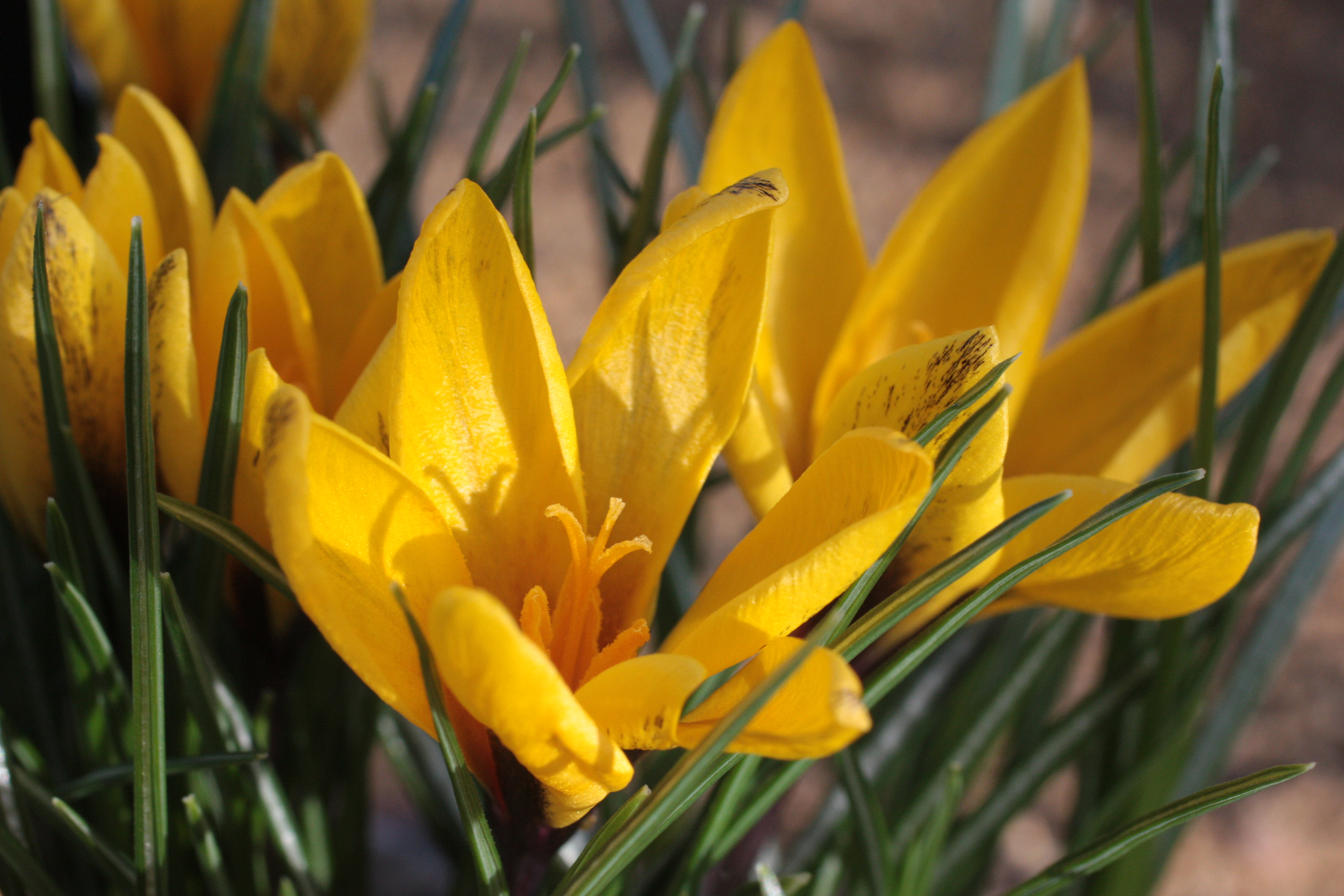
Spring Crocus in flower

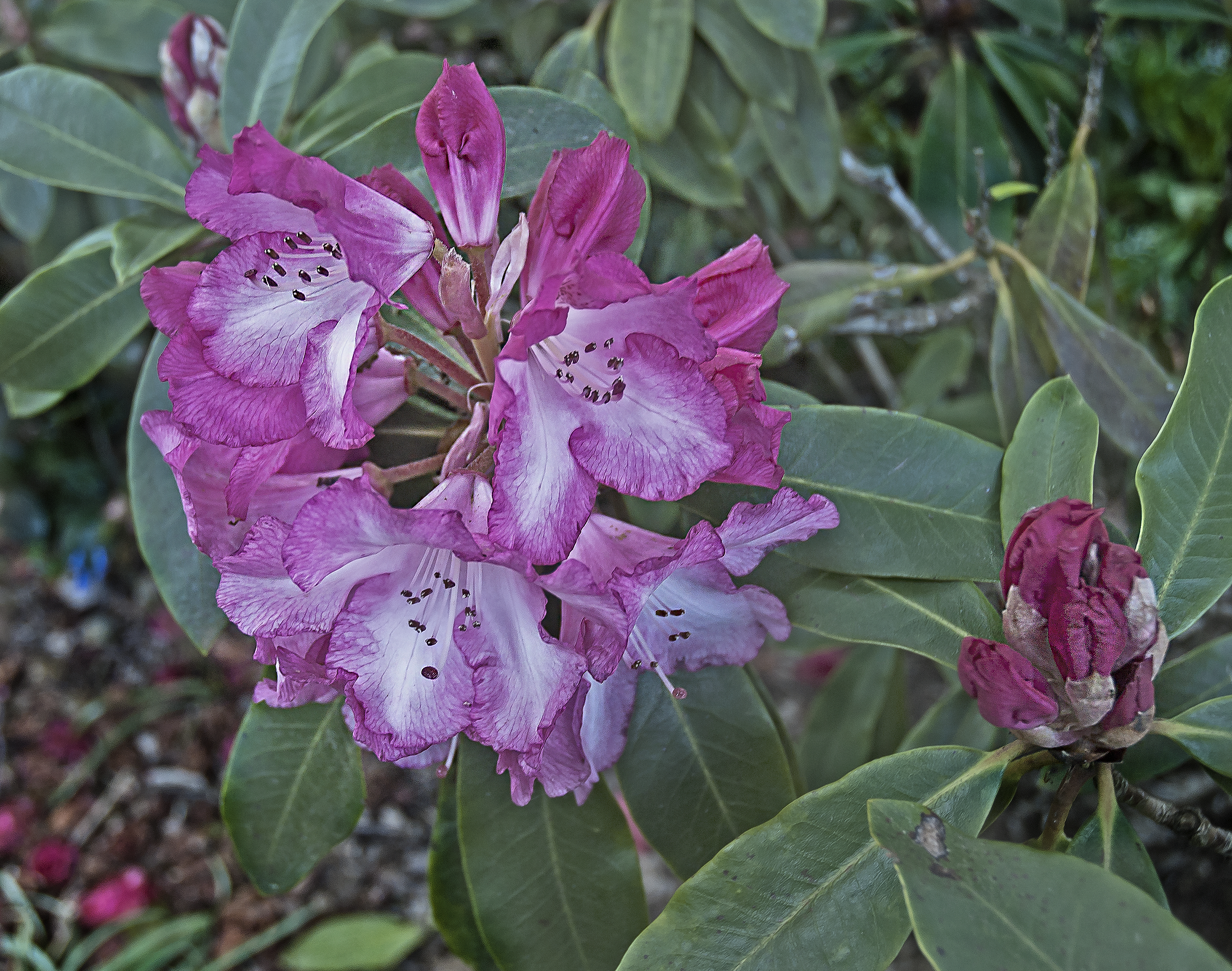
Pink rhododendron at RHS Wisley

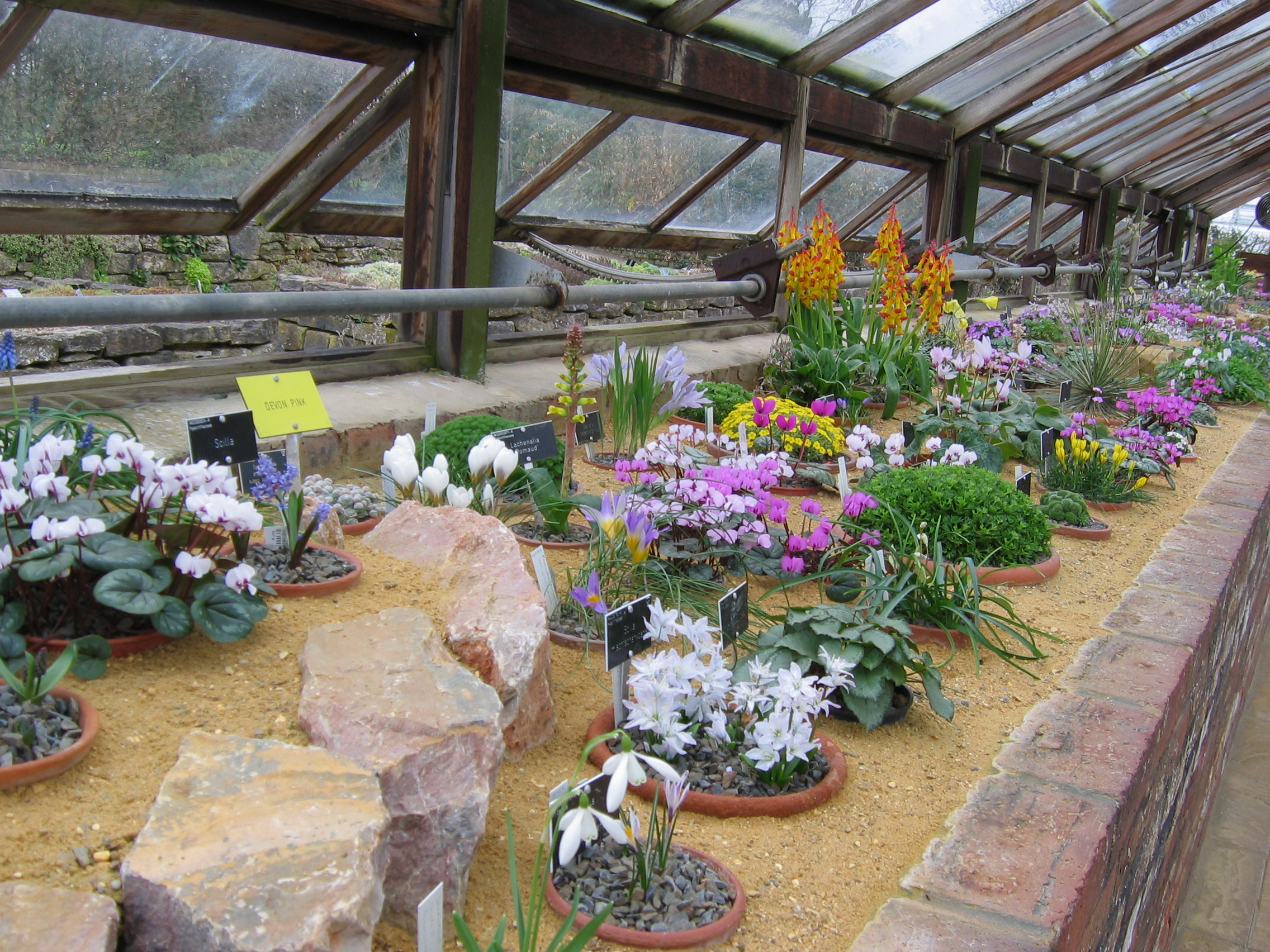
In one of the alpine houses at Wisley

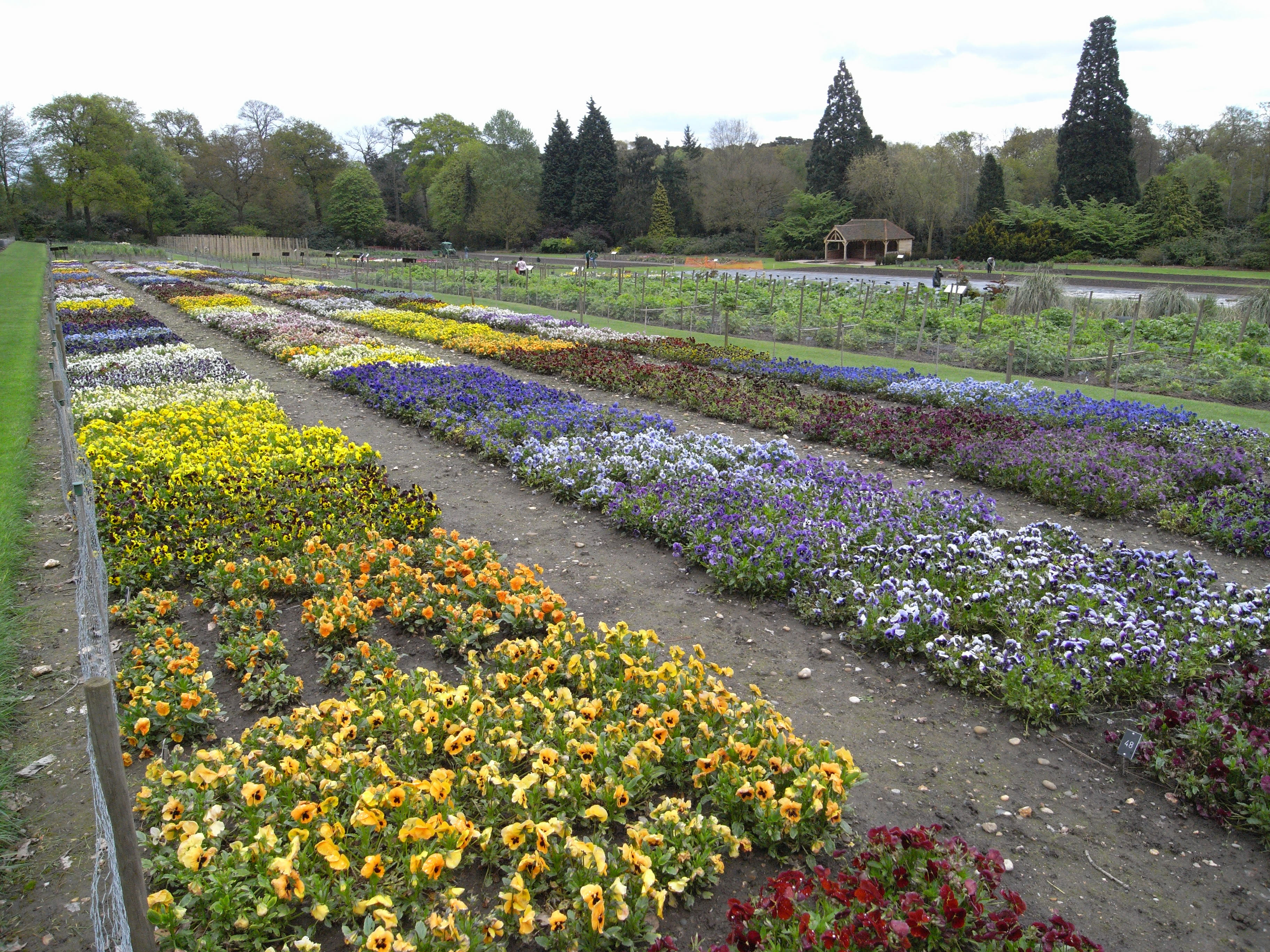
(Old) trials field at Wisley showing some of the hundreds of varieties assessed for the Award of Garden Merit

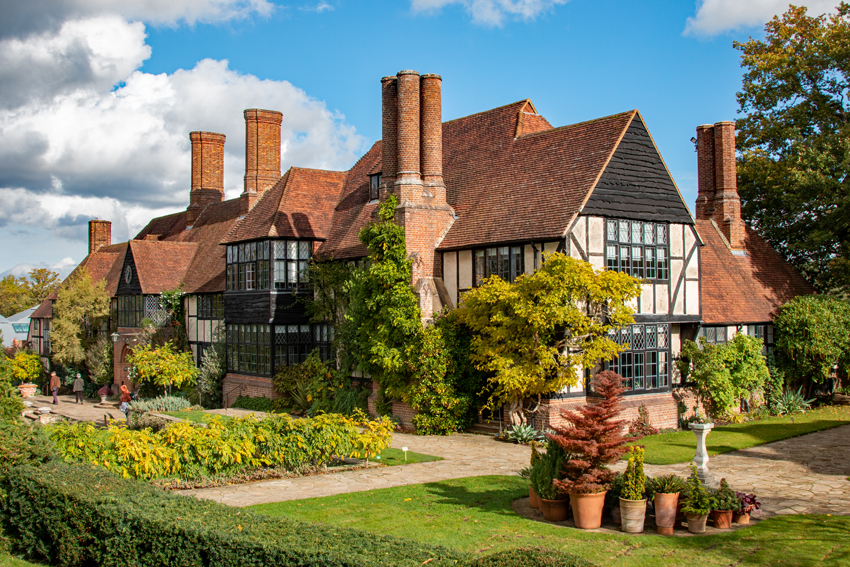
Old Laboratory building at RHS Wisley

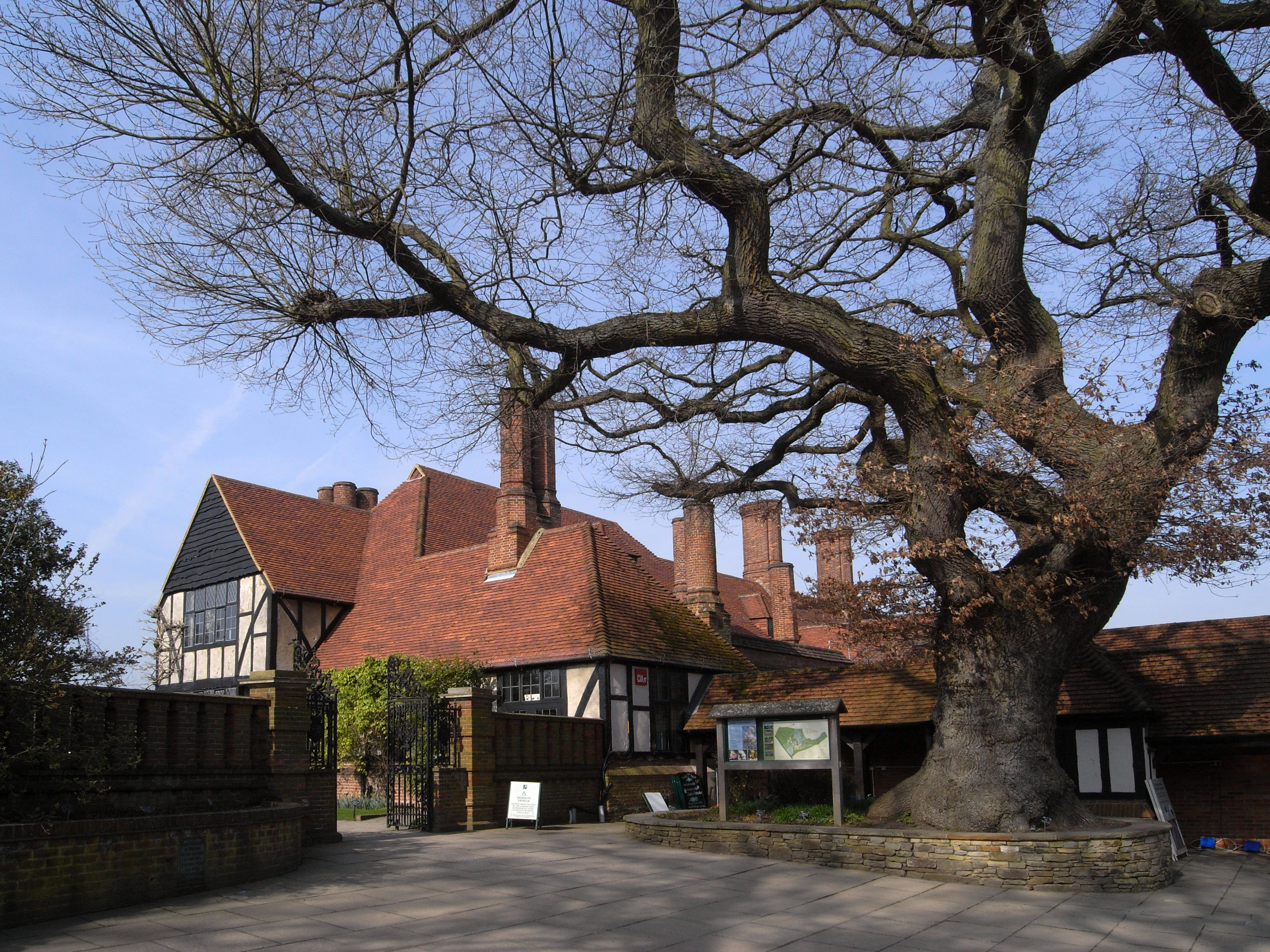
Quercus robur beside the laboratory

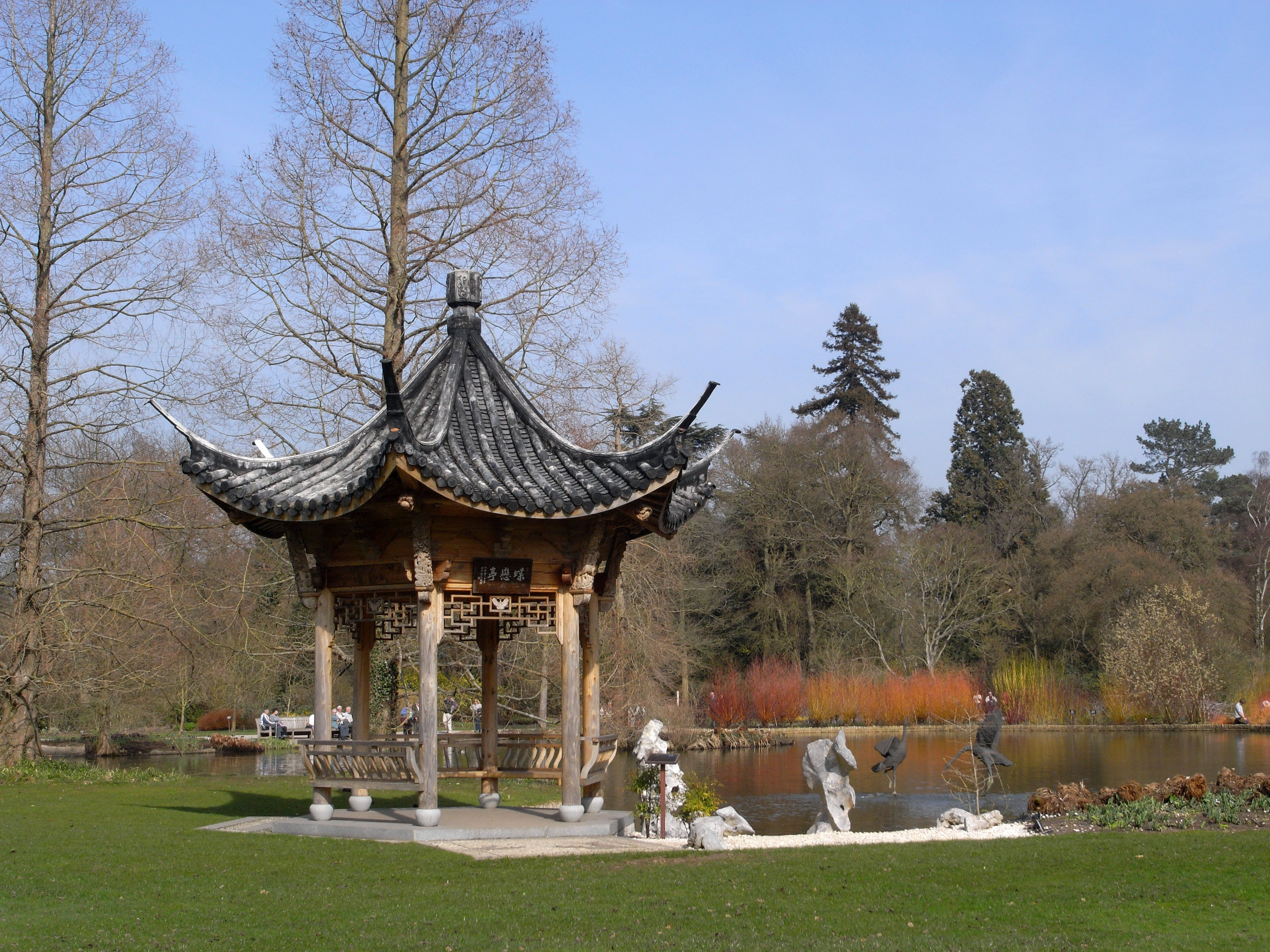
The Butterfly Lovers Pavilion

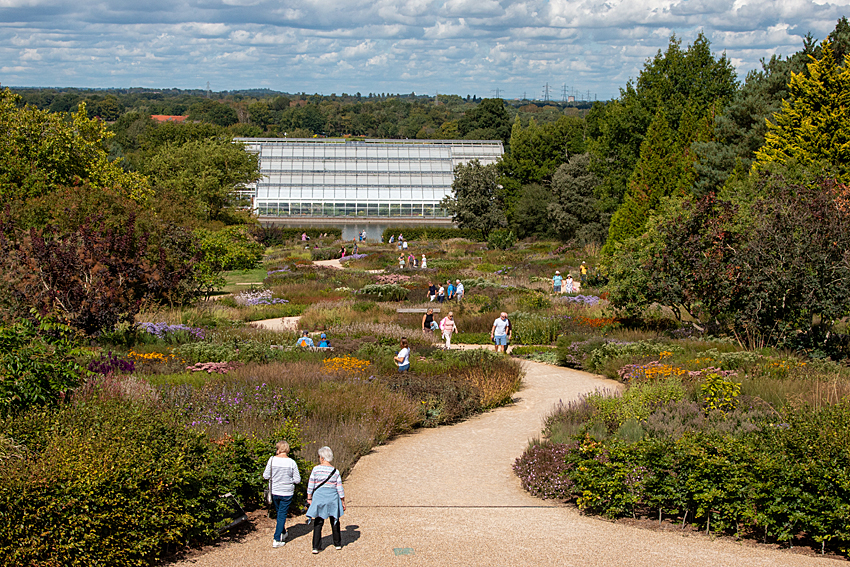
Rock gardens and glasshouse, Wisley

== Bibliography ==
- RHS (2017). "RHS Garden Wisley".
- Desmond, Ray (1994) [1977]. Dictionary of British and Irish botanists and horticulturalists: including plant collectors, flower painters and garden designers (2nd ed.). London: Taylor & Francis. ISBN 9780850668438.
