= RHS Garden Hyde Hall =

Public garden in Essex, England

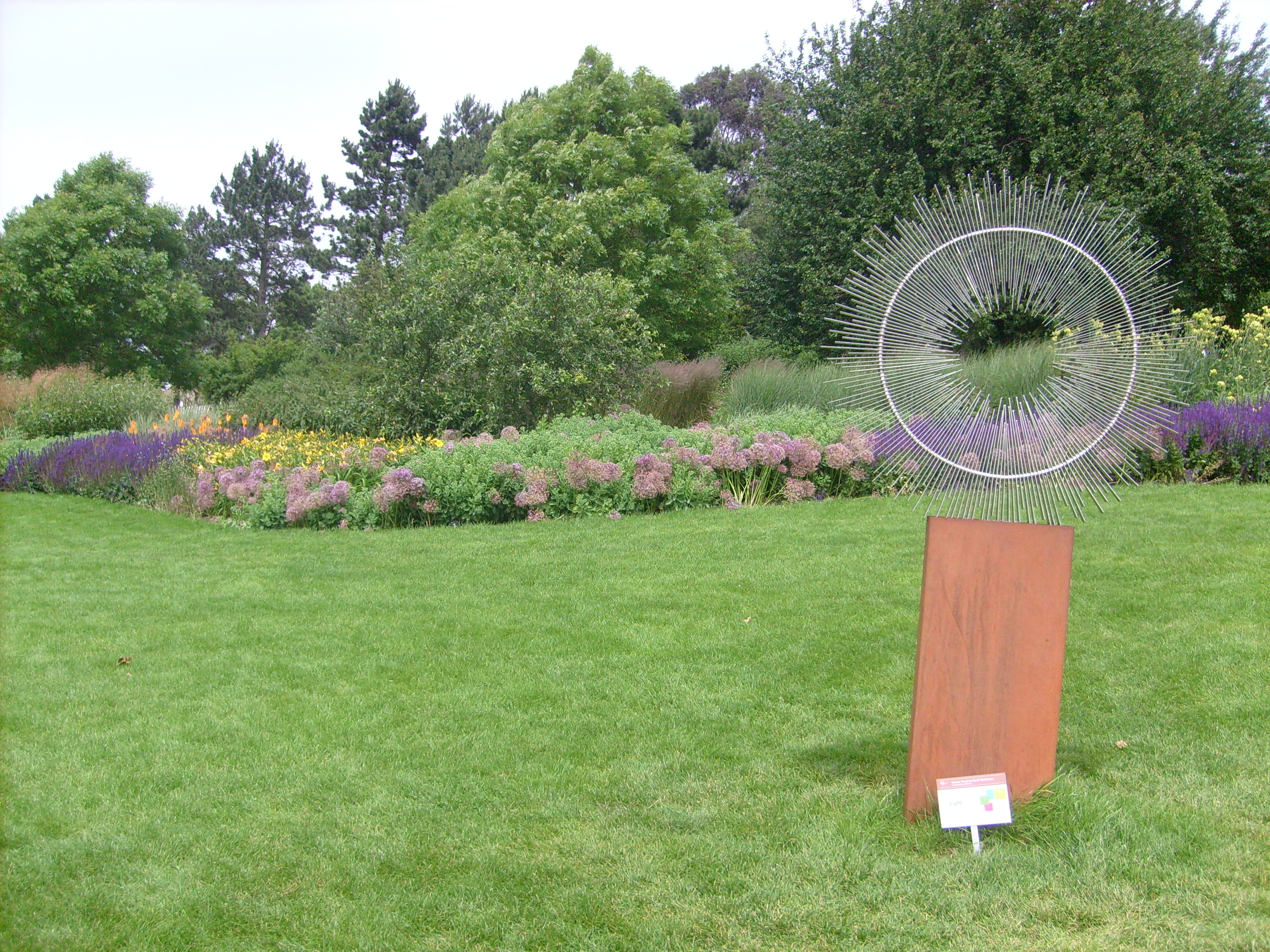
- Clover Hill at Hyde Hall

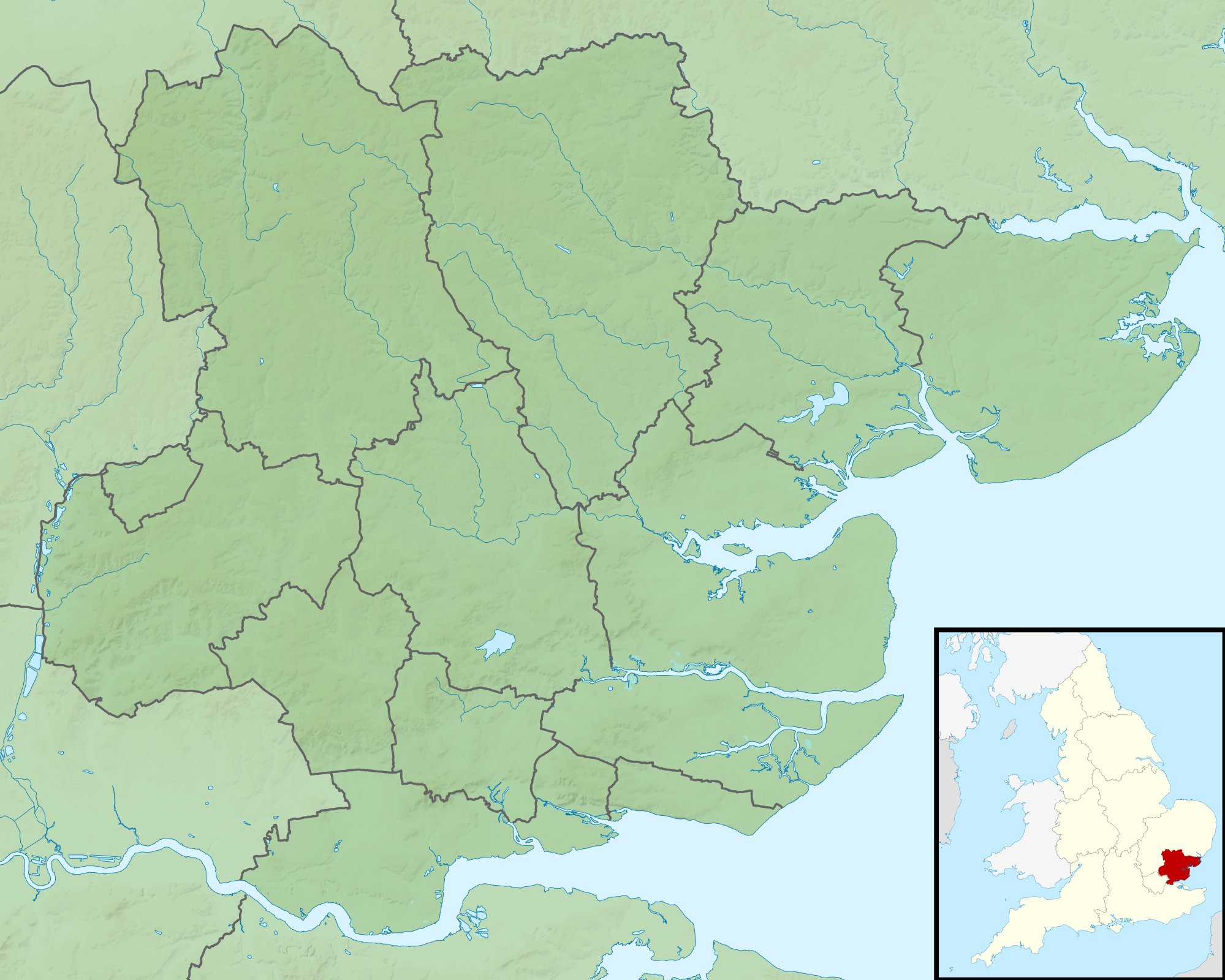
- Location within Essex
- Location: Creephedge Lane; Rettendon; Chelmsford CM3 8ET
- Coordinates: 51°39′58″N 00°34′33″E
- Area: 360 acres (150 ha)
- Owner: Royal Horticultural Society
- Visitors: 441,562 (2025)
- Status: Open

RHS Garden Hyde Hall is a public display garden run by the Royal Horticultural Society, located near Chelmsford in the English county of Essex. It is one of five public gardens run by the society, alongside Wisley in Surrey, Harlow Carr in North Yorkshire, Rosemoor in Devon, and Bridgewater in Greater Manchester.

== History ==
The garden at Hyde Hall was created by Dr and Mrs Robinson in 1955. Hyde Hall was formerly a working farm on a hilltop surrounded by arable land. The site was cleared and 60 trees purchased from Wickford market a few miles away. These trees now form the Woodland Garden. A few Eucalyptus trees were planted by the Robinsons. Shelter belts of Lawson and Leyland cypress hedges were planted during the 1960s, and during this decade the farmland to the west of the Hyde Hall hilltop was incorporated into the garden.

In 1976 Helen and Dick Robinson formed the Hyde Hall Garden Trust which would manage the garden on a long-term basis. The trust donated Hyde Hall to the Royal Horticultural Society in 1993.

Robert Brett became the curator in 2015, after taking over from Ian Le Gros, who became Head of Site.

== Garden features ==
Hyde Hall's 360-acre site encompasses a range of garden styles, from the Dry Garden with drought resistant plants, to the Hilltop Garden with roses and herbaceous borders and the Australia and New Zealand Garden with plants sourced from those two countries. Hyde Hall has seen significant investment in recent years with the opening of a new Global Growth Vegetable Garden (in 2017) showing vegetables from around the world, a new Winter Garden (in 2018) hosting an RHS Trial of Cornus, a new Welcome building (in 2017), and Hilltop Complex (in 2018) featuring a new restaurant and activity centre.

There is a reference library, located in the old farmhouse. It provides a substantial collection of books on practical gardening, garden design, botanical art, garden history, wildlife gardening, plant hunting and much more.
