= List of royal visits to Manchester and Salford under Queen Victoria =

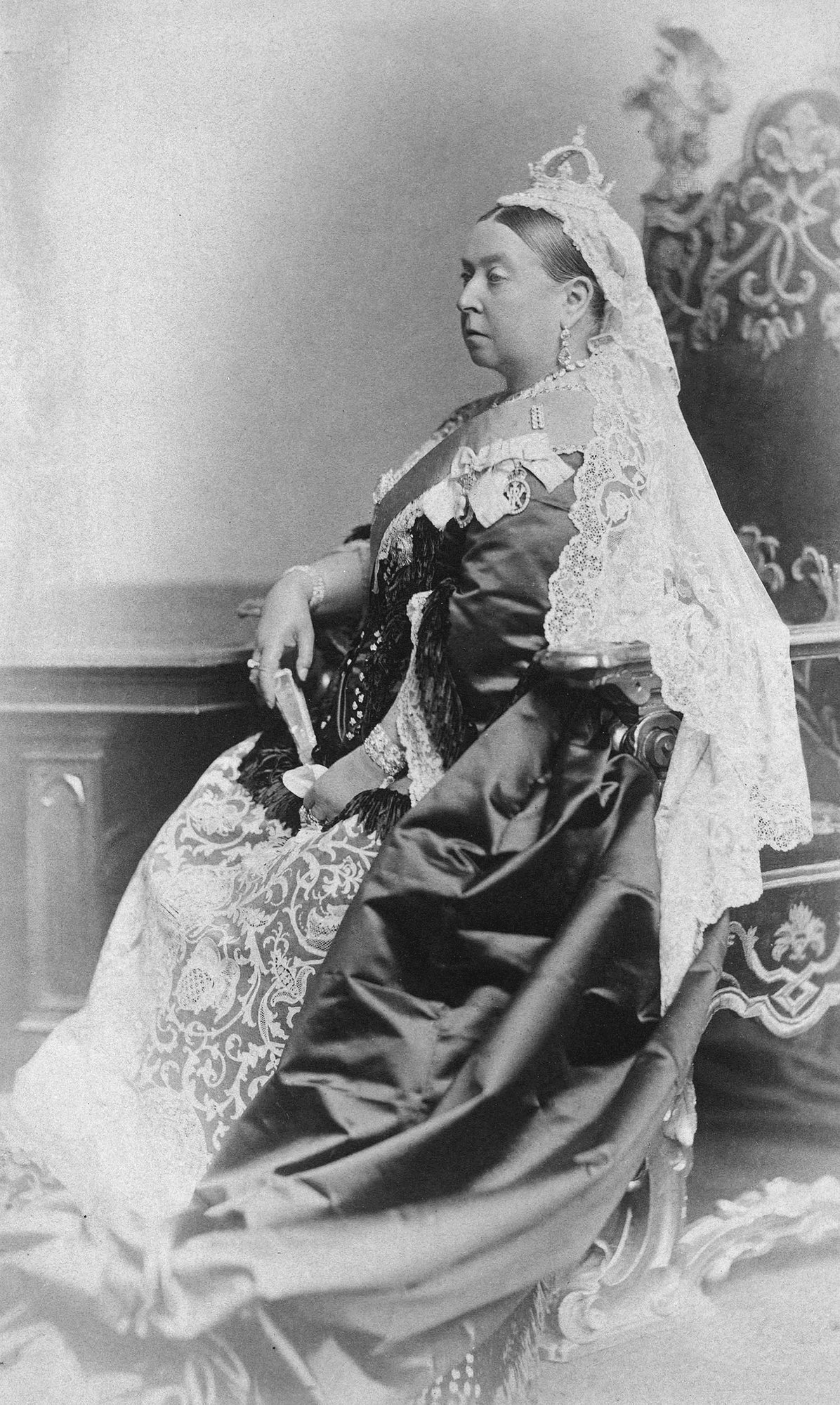
Queen Victoria in 1887

Royal visits to Manchester and the surrounding areas in the nineteenth century signify important achievements in the city's history and offer an insight into the development of the area during this period. Moreover, Manchester's response to such visits, the preparations and public displays of loyalty to the crown, challenge the perceived political history of Victorian Manchester, which was famed for its Liberalist notions, Free Trade and the radical position of parties such as the Chartists.

== Social and political change ==
Queen Victoria's accession to the throne in 1837 was a turbulent time for Manchester, as it had been in the previous century; however a number of changes prompted a more favourable outlook of the British monarchy to slowly emerge among the town's working classes. Manchester had historically been divided politically and the Industrial Revolution had created new men at all levels, including the lower social orders and dissatisfaction with the Reform Act 1832 (2 & 3 Will. 4. c. 45) had provoked widespread agitation among the working classes. As Victoria came to the throne, so Chartism came to the masses and in Manchester this manifested itself in the Manchester Political Union who sponsored a massive rally at Kersal Moor in Salford. The party, solely concerned with the working people, supported the general strikes of 1842, known as Plug Plot, in which thousands of mill workers protested against wage cuts, but shortly afterwards the Chartist movement declined. At the same time the town's cultural diversity had continued to widen, as an influx of Irish immigrants had entered the town and later, in the 1880s, Jewish immigrants fleeing persecution in Russia also settled in Manchester. Both groups were representative of everything the English working man, at this time, was not, a point emphasised by Tory politics, which, whilst not openly advocating extreme sectarian attitudes, maintained that the Monarch and the Church of England were at the heart of the Englishman's national identity. Furthermore, attitudes towards the Monarchy were improving, as the public saw Queen Victoria as a better example of the constitutional monarch, not involving herself in politics, which, when combined with Prince Albert's philanthropic activities, in the late 1840s, with education and housing for the poor, resulted in a shift in public opinion and the popularity of the Royal family increased. Finally, the Reform Acts of 1867 and 1884 had enabled many working men to vote, from which "popular Toryism" emerged and needless to say the party's ethos of constitution, Queen and Church attracted the working classes, which despite nineteenth-century England's shift towards a secularised state manifested itself in open displays of loyalty to the Crown.

== Royal visits ==
=== 1851 ===
This was the first visit of a monarch to the region for a century and a half and both Manchester and Salford went to great lengths to host a memorable event. The escort for the royal party included a Guard of Honour of the Yeoman Cavalry who accompanied them as far as Cross lane, the boundary between Pendleton and Salford. However, at this point, the cavalry were dismissed "for fear of disturbances, as Peterloo was still fresh in the minds of the people." 1851 had already been a significant year for Prince Albert with the Great Exhibition in Hyde Park, London, an event with which he had direct involvement and one which celebrated industry and technology, an important connection with Manchester. They stayed at Worsley New Hall as guests of the Earl of Ellesmere. On 10 October the Queen and Prince Albert left Worsley Hall and the procession took them through Salford to Peel Park, where a suggested 80,000 Sunday school children performed the national anthem, a moment which was argued as the most celebrated of the visit for its mass public appeal, as well as religious and educational significance:

One of the great moral features of Manchester – of the manufacturing districts generally – is the extent to which the Sunday-School system is carried… educating thousands who would otherwise have grown up in utter and deplorable ignorance.

The Queen responded with an address in which she expressed her "great pleasure ... seeing the attention that was paid to the education of the rising generation in Manchester and Salford". From Peel Park the royal procession continued into Manchester and the combined spectator figure recorded for both boroughs was 800,000, which The Times described as, "a population new on the soil, very mixed, very laborious, accustomed to hear all sides of political questions and to decide them on Utilitarian principles". This practical, down-to-earth stereotype of the people of Manchester was, by the 1850s visible as the warehouse, representative of the town's trading success, appeared and the advances of industry and technology, close to the heart of Prince Albert, were at the centre of its achievements.

=== 1857 ===
In May 1857 Prince Albert arrived in Manchester, one month before the Queen, to open the Art Treasures Exhibition and also inaugurate one of the first portrait statues to be erected of Queen Victoria during her reign. The statue in Peel Park commemorated the Royal visit to Salford in 1851 and the aforementioned success of the 80, 000 strong, Sunday schools' performance of the National Anthem. Like 1851 the visit attracted large crowds and Manchester was awash with colour, as the Standard and Royal Arms flags decorating the majestic Watts Warehouse celebrated the city's civic pride and dedication to the crown; a scene which would be replicated on a much grander scale in 1894.

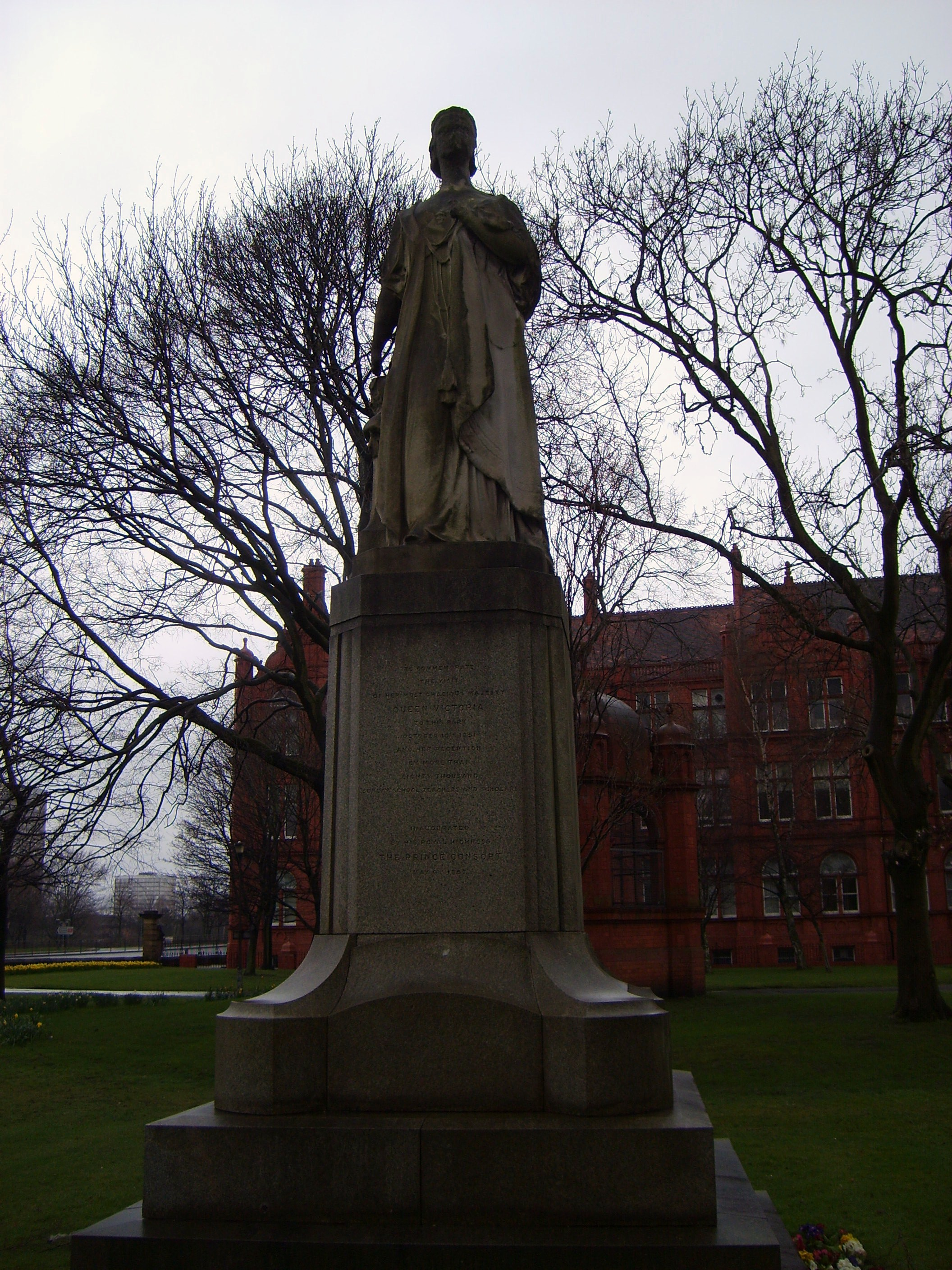
A statue of Queen Victoria in Peel Park, Salford

=== 1894 ===
On 21 May the Queen visited to perform the official opening of the Manchester Ship Canal. The Ship Canal took seven years to build and stretched for 35 miles, creating the city's link to the open sea and independent shipping. The Queen knighted the Mayor of Salford, William Henry Bailey and the Lord Mayor of Manchester, Anthony Marshall at the opening of the Canal.

In the run up to the visit, the city had experienced periods of both hardship and prosperity, with the depression of the 1870s and the continuing cycle of the cotton trade, thus the ship canal symbolised the future of not only cotton, but also trade in general for Manchester:

The strain of purely joyous sentiment suggestive of youth and high hope and bright anticipation, scarcely perhaps to be looked for in those more recent years.

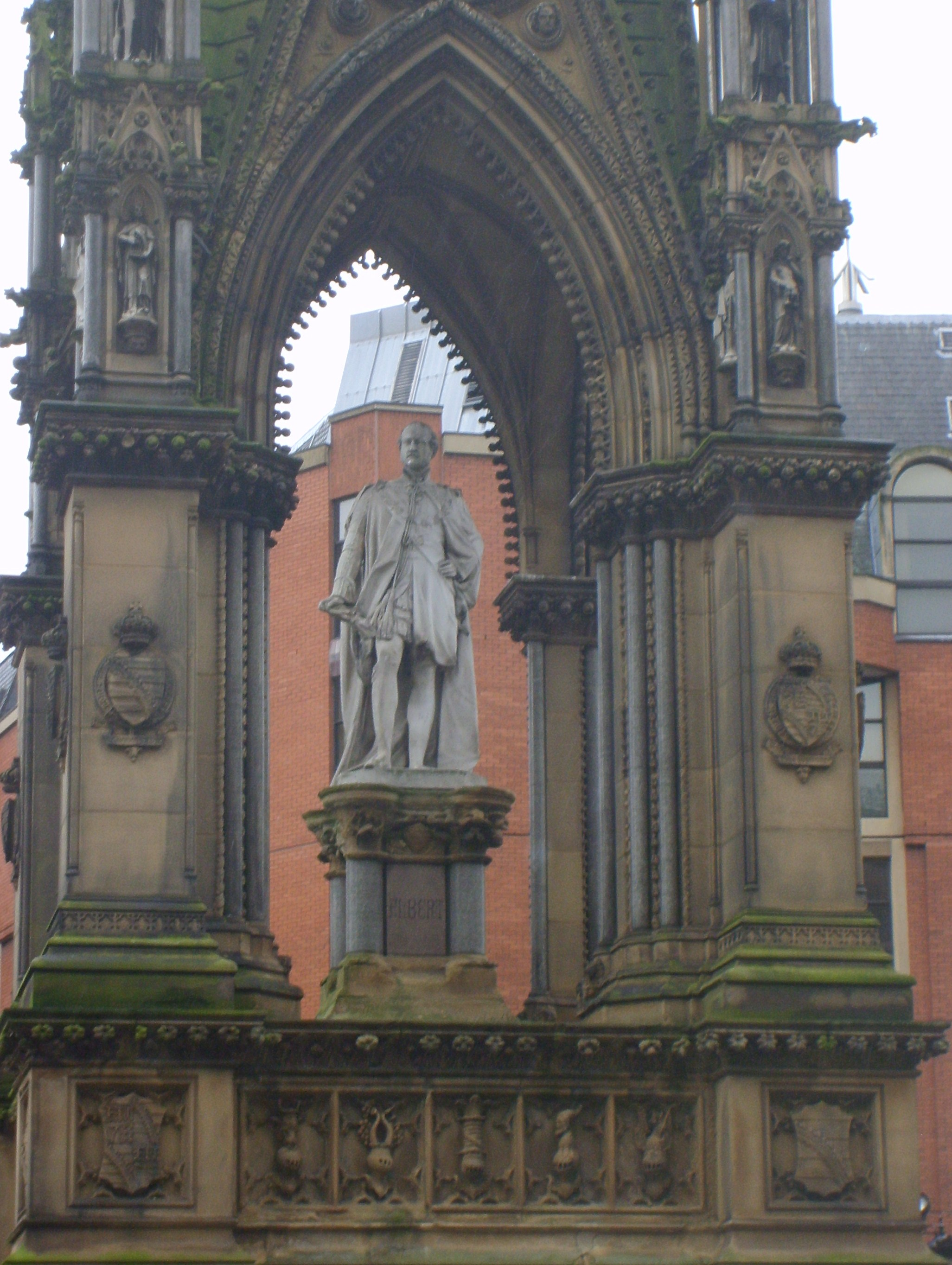
The Albert Memorial in Manchester

The Manchester Guardian hailed the importance and success of the visit, in which the Queen saw a Manchester that "did not exist in 1851 or 1857" and quoted the Morning Post's claims that the ceremony was one of "exceptional interest and importance." Not only did the Queen officially open the canal, which represented technological and engineering advances, but she also viewed a city changed in appearance since her last visit. The Queen rode past the stately warehouses, like that of Messrs. Watt on Portland Street, the newly built Manchester Town Hall (1877), with the Albert Memorial, in Albert Square, Manchester's tribute to her late husband and finally the emerging commercial buildings epitomised in Lewis's Department store, all of which shaped the Manchester still visible to today's citizens and visitors. Moreover, as Sir Bosdin Leech commented, in the Leech Family Diaries, the crowd was vast and represented a city emerging out of the uncertainty of the third quarter of the century. The ship canal, the changing city and the cheering crowds signified a Manchester built on determination and innovation, both symbolic of the values of Queen Victoria and her late husband.

== Historical significance ==
Although for its celebration of engineering achievement and vast attendance 1894 was arguably the most significant of royal visits to the region, the position of Manchester as a modern city and the plight of the working man during the nineteenth century reveals all three occasions to be of equal historical importance. As The Times's comments in 1851 emphasised, Manchester was new and built largely on industrious principles, which was in direct conflict with the traditions and ancient history of the Monarchy; therefore, the town's response and public support of the visits may be argued as surprising. However, it is clear from the social and political changes, which occurred between the Queen's accession to the throne and her first visit to the town that Chartism and forms of Republican politics had failed to provoke significant anti-royalist feelings. Moreover, the failure of Chartism to instigate change had forced the proletariat to reconsider his political stance, which ultimately led to his shift towards that of the Anglican Tory. This, when coupled with underlying tensions towards the Irish Catholics saw the emergence of a new working-class man, who, in the second half of the century, subconsciously reinstated the Head of the Church of England as the symbol of Englishness and displayed his national pride through a revived loyalty to the crown. A notion summed up by the Manchester Guardian, reporting on the visit of 1857 and hailing the, "proud spectacle for everyone rejoicing in the name and character of Englishmen".

== See also ==
- History of Manchester

== Books and Additional Sources ==
1. Manchester Guardian Archive Online,
2. Hartwell, C., Manchester (London: Penguin, 2001)
3. Hill, M. and Waghorn, T. (eds.), Royal Manchester: From Victoria to Diana, A Pictorial History of the Royal Families Visits to Greater Manchester (Manchester: Diverse Media Limited, 1998
4. Hunt, T. and Whitfield, V., Art Treasures in Manchester: 150 years on (Manchester: Philip Wilson Publishers, 2007)
5. Williams, R., The Contentious Crown: Public Discussion of the British Monarchy in the Reign of Queen Victoria (Aldershot: Ashgate Publishing Limited, 1997)
6. Wyke, T. and Cook, H., Public Sculpture of Greater Manchester (Liverpool: Liverpool University Press, 2004)
