= Peel Park, Salford =

Urban park in Greater Manchester, England

Peel Park
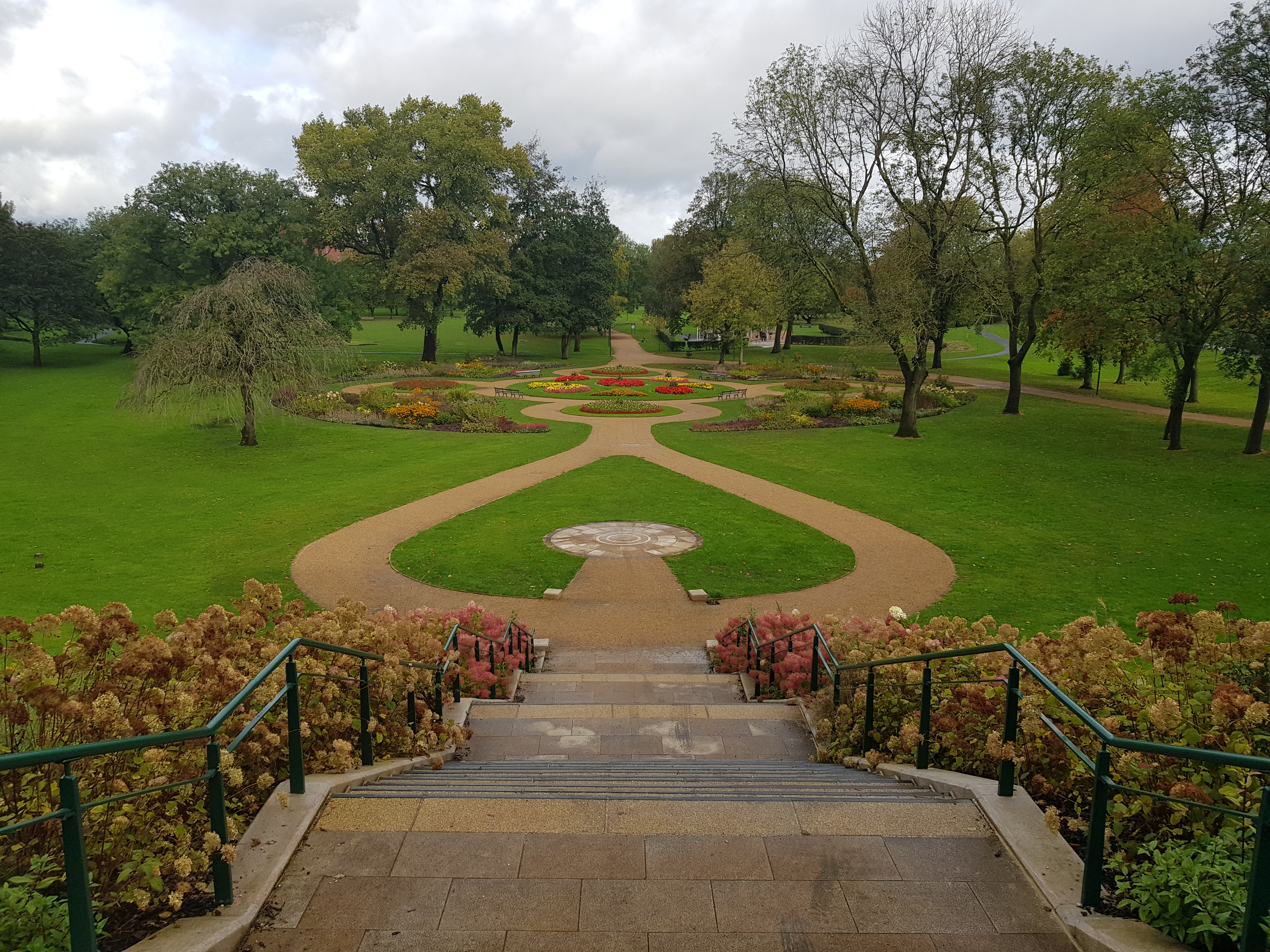
- Peel Park from behind Salford Museum
- Interactive map of Peel Park
- Location: Salford, Greater Manchester, England
- Coordinates: 53°29′15″N 2°16′14″W
- Created: 22 August 1846

Peel Park is a public urban park in Salford, Greater Manchester, England, located on the flood plain of the River Irwell below Salford Crescent and adjacent to the University of Salford. It was the first of three public parks to be opened on 22 August 1846, for the people of Manchester and Salford, paid for by public subscription. The park was the main public venue for the 1851 royal visit of Queen Victoria to Manchester and Salford and has been the subject of a number of paintings by the Salford artist, L.S. Lowry.

Peel Park fell into disrepair during the latter part of the 20th century but underwent a £1.6 million refurbishment in 2017 after a successful bid to the Heritage Lottery Fund. It was added to the Register of Historic Parks and Gardens by Historic England in December 2023.

== History ==
Early 19th-century reformers had become concerned about the consequences of enclosure and thought that public walks and gardens were the solution. Richard Walker, the Member of Parliament for Bury had spoken in Parliament about the lack of areas for recreation in his home town and in 1833 the Select Committee on Public Walks was set up to look at the problem. The committee noted that, owing to urban development and rising property values during the previous 50 years, "many inclosures of open spaces in the vicinity of Towns had taken place, and little or no provision had been made for Public Walks or Open Spaces, fitted to afford means of exercise or amusement to the middle or humbler classes". They gathered witnesses from a dozen or so of the large manufacturing towns to try to establish remedies. One of their conclusions was that "having a place to which they (the humbler classes) might resort on a Sunday Evening would tend to promote that self-respect which is so advantageous to all classes". Although there were a number of parks in the UK, most of them were royal parks or privately owned estates, and the landowners could exclude those they did not approve of, as is illustrated by the following letter published in The Times on 10 July 1846:

TO THE EDITOR OF THE TIMES.

Sir, I wish that you would let your readers understand that Hyde park and St James's Park are not public parks. Victoria park and the suburban parks are intended for the public — the former parks for the aristocracy. St. James's park has for some time been very exclusive, and now Hyde-park imitates its neighbour. Last Wednesday every decently dressed mechanic was turned out of Hyde-park. The warden in green said this was in accordance, with new orders received from the Ranger. It strikes me that these very green, underlings are acting in a way, whether with or without authority, most conducive to encourage revolutionary Principles, and I expect some day to hear of their getting a good ducking in the Serpentine. What is the use of this excessive exclusiveness with regard to parks which used to be considered public?, It is enough to make any person's blood boil to see a well-dressed mechanic refused admission into a park considered public. I wish, Sir, you would either enlighten me on the subject or attempt some improvement of the aristocratic notions of the men in green. Their behaviour proves that no one is so exclusive as one of the lower classes when placed in authority. I am, Sir, Your obedient servant, C. D. Hyde-park-square, July 9.

The most prominent supporters of the campaign in the north of England were Liberal MP for Manchester Mark Philips, and the then Prime Minister, Sir Robert Peel. After seven years of campaigning, Manchester set up the Committee for Public Walks, Gardens & Playgrounds. Large sums of money were contributed to the fund by both these men and also by the local workers. In a letter to the Manchester Guardian, published in The Times on 31 October 1844, the writer said;

Scarcely a week passes without bringing its own new and striking testimony to the deep interest felt in the Promotion of this great object by all classes of the community. From the Premier of England to the humblest operative ... We have already mentioned several instances in the course of the subscription which show that the clerks salesmen, warehousemen, and even the packers and porters in the warehouses are as heartily disposed to promote the success of this object as any other class of the community; and they have proved themselves as liberal, in proportion to their means, as their employers themselves. We are tempted, even in anticipation of the usual weekly advertisement of the sums received since the amount last advertised, to mention the most recent instance of this class which has contributed to swell the aggregate amount of the fund by no inconsiderable sum. We have already noticed the handsome contributions of Mr. Mark Philips and of Sir George Philips, and we have now the pleasure to record the subscription of the clerks, salesmen, warehousemen, and porters, in the warehouse of the firm of which our excellent representative is a member - Messrs. J. and W. Philips and Co., Church-street. Including all classes of employees youths, porters, &c., we find that 90 individuals in this establishment have contributed the very large and liberal amount of £221. 2s. in aid of the fund for public parks. - Manchester Guardian

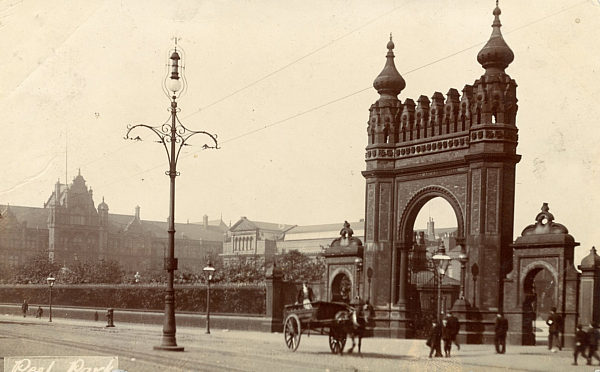
Victoria Arch circa 1905

On 29 March 1845, the committee bought the 32 acres (13 ha) of the Lark Hill estate from William Garnett Esq for £5,000. A design competition was held for the three parks - Queen's Park and Philips Park, in Manchester, and Peel Park in Salford. Each park was required to have playgrounds, including provision for archery and quoits, together with skittle and ball alleys, a refreshment room, one or more fountains, and retiring places. The competition was won by Joshua Major and Son of Knowsthorpe, near Leeds, and the parks were laid out under that firm's supervision in 1845–46, by the company of Pim and Richardson, Nurserymen, of Higher Ardwick.

The three parks were all opened, with great ceremony, on 22 August 1846, Peel Park on the Lark Hill estate being the first to be opened "for the enjoyment and recreation of the public" followed by Queen's Park in Harpurhey and Philips Park in Bradford, Manchester. Peel Park, named in honour of Sir Robert Peel, is now said to be possibly the world's first public park, although it may not even be the first public park in England as Derby Arboretum, which was given to Derby Town Council on 16 September 1840, claims this title.

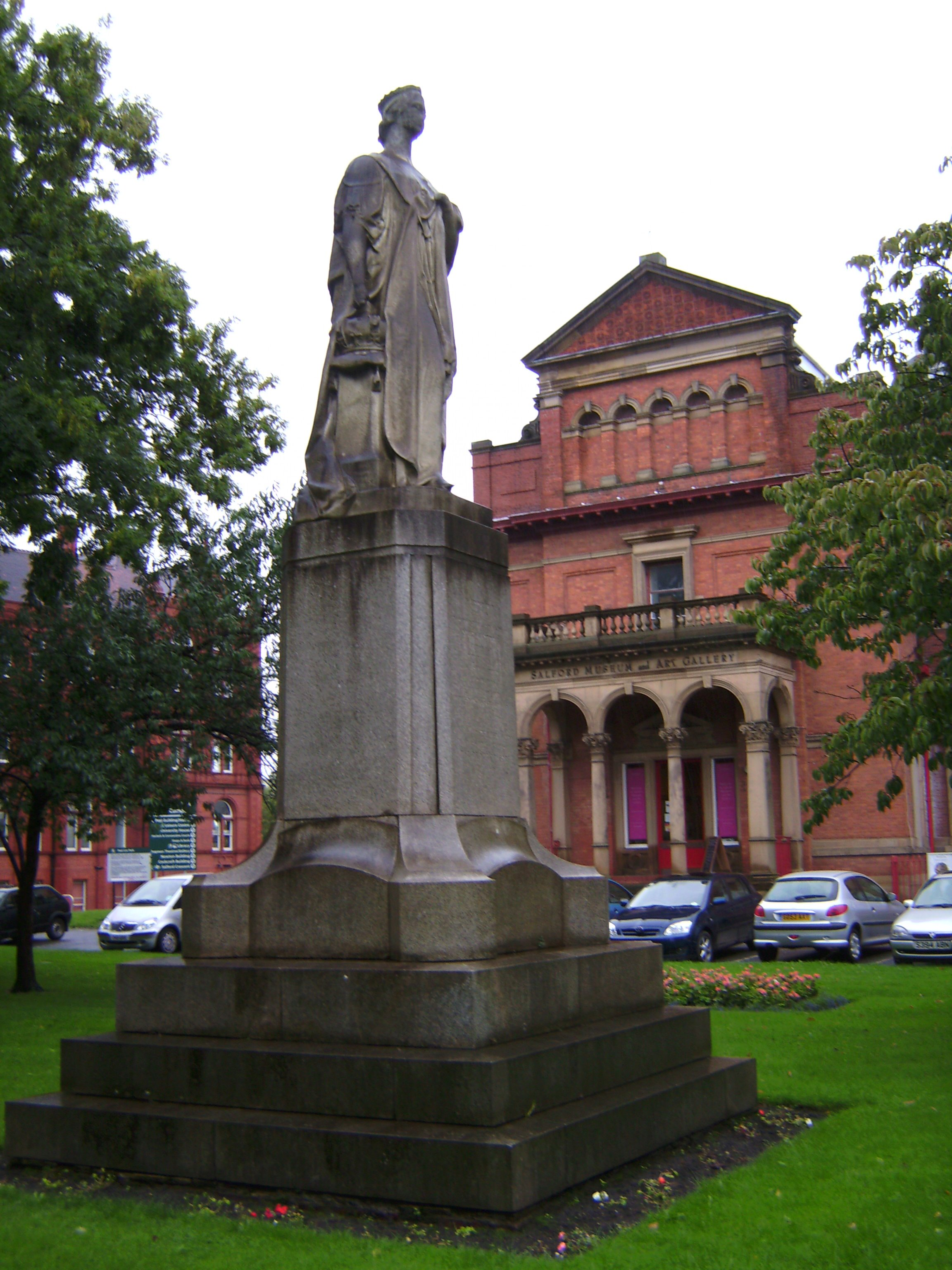
Statue of Queen Victoria in front of the Salford Museum and Art Gallery

Originally the mansion on the site, Lark Hill Villa situated on the higher ground overlooking the park, served as the refreshment rooms for the park, but four years later the building was converted, and opened in November 1850 as the Royal Museum & Public Library (now the Salford Museum and Art Gallery). The library is said to be the first unconditionally free public library in England.

Following a great wave of public grief after Robert Peel's unexpected death in 1850, a commemorative statue was erected in the park, paid for by public subscription. This was the beginning of a collection of bronze and marble statues of public figures to be erected in the park, all of which were produced by the sculptor Matthew Noble. The collection included depictions of Queen Victoria, Albert, Prince Consort, Joseph Brotherton MP, and Richard Cobden MP. The statue of Queen Victoria was erected in front of the Salford Museum and Art Gallery in 1857, to commemorate the royal visit of 1851 to Manchester and Salford, when she was welcomed by a crowd of eighty thousand people in the park. The statue was unveiled by the Queen on her second visit in 1857 by which time a stone arch decorated in the Indian style, the Victoria Arch (pictured), had been erected in her honour at the entrance to the park. A commemorative statue of the Prince Consort was erected after his death in 1861.

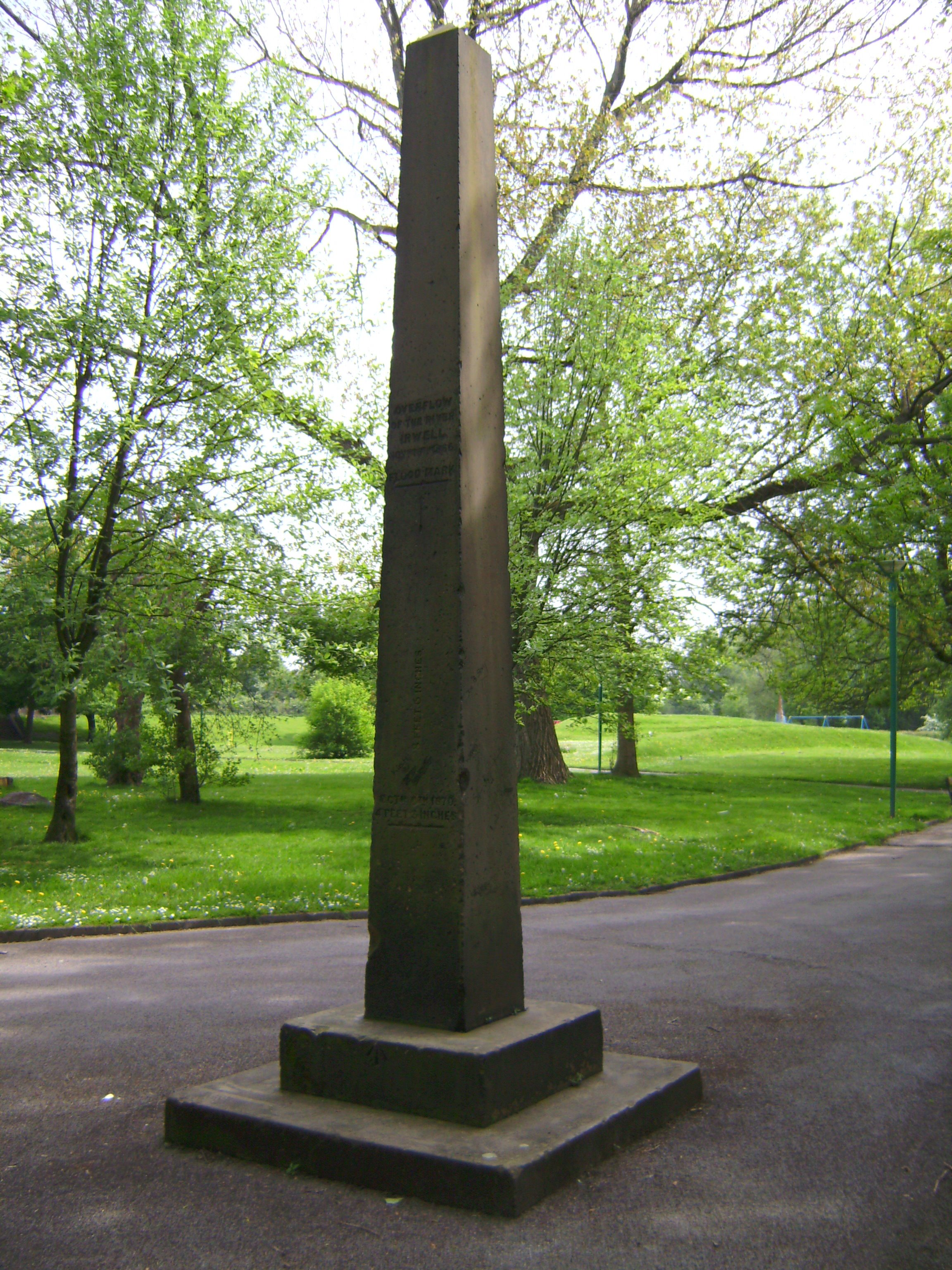
Flood obelisk showing 1866 flood level of 8 feet 6 inches (2.59 m). A second flood line was added at 4 feet 3 inches (1.30 m) after the floods of 1870

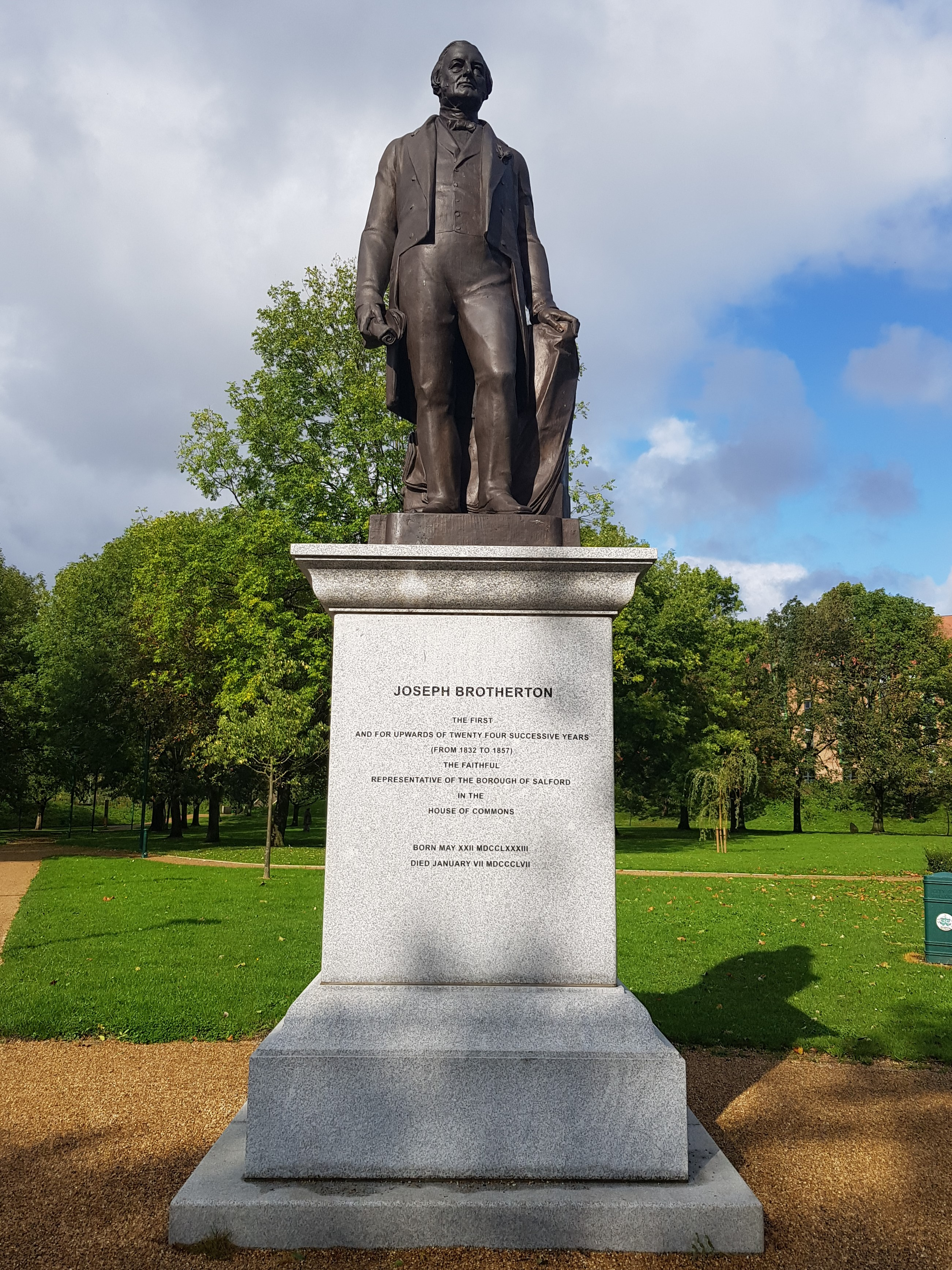
Statue of Joseph Brotherton

In November 1866, the River Irwell burst its banks, flooding much of Lower Broughton. The flood was said to be "more extensive and devastating in its effects than perhaps any that has occurred in this locality within the memory of living man". Three men were drowned and many others, including the keeper of the park, had to be rescued from the upper storeys of their homes. As part of a general renovation of the park a granite flood obelisk was erected in 1867 with a flood marker on two faces showing the height of 8 feet 6 inches (2.59 m), reached by the water on 16 November 1866.

The Royal Technical Institute was built in the park in the latter years of the 19th century, opening in 1896, and the artist L.S. Lowry studied art there in the 1920s, by which time it had been renamed the Royal Technical College, Salford. A number of his works feature views of the park including; five sketches (Peel Park Sketches 1-5), two pencil drawings named Bandstand, Peel Park, Salford (1924 and 1925), Over the Terrace, Peel Park (1927) and two paintings named Peel Park, Salford (1927 and 1930). The Salford Museum and Art Gallery built up a major collection of his works from 1930, and housed them until August 2000 when they were moved to The Lowry at Salford Quays.

In 1937, the Victoria Arch was declared unsafe and demolished and in 1954 the statues of Robert Peel, Richard Cobden and Joseph Brotherton were dismantled and put into storage, to make way for an extension of Salford Technical College. In 1969, the Peel and Brotherton statues were sold to Christopher Richards of Gawsworth Hall, Gawsworth, Cheshire, and placed in the grounds of the hall where the Peel statue still stands. The Brotherton statue was bought by Manchester City Council 15 years later and placed close to Albert Bridge looking across the River Irwell towards Salford. In May 2018, the Brotherton statue was re-erected in the newly refurbished Peel Park - the whereabouts of the Cobden statue is unknown. The only other statues remaining in the park today are the two depicting Queen Victoria and the Prince Consort. The Technical School became a college of advanced technology in 1956, and part of the University of Salford in 1967. A number of other university buildings have since been constructed on the site.

In 1954, Peel Park was featured in the film Hobson's Choice as the courting place for characters Maggie Hobson (Brenda de Banzie) and William Mossop (John Mills).

A report to Salford City Council on 21 May 2008 recommended that Peel Park and the adjacent David Lewis Recreation Ground be included in The Crescent Conservation Area:

REPORT OF THE LEAD MEMBER FOR PLANNING TO COUNCIL ON 21st MAY 2008

Boundary changes are recommended for The Crescent. These consist of:

The inclusion of Peel Park and David Lewis Recreation Ground. The park was opened in 1846 as one of a pioneering Manchester/Salford initiative of three public parks. These were the first to be established in a major industrial city. Linked with the establishment of one of the earliest public local museums in the country and the very first free public library in 1850, Peel Park formed a crucial part of landmark social reform in the Victorian period and was intrinsic to the development of The Crescent area. Peel Park was extended in phases through the late 19th and early 20th century to include the open space now known as the David Lewis Recreation Ground. The proposed boundary change reflects the historical boundary of the early 20th century.

In January 2014, a successful bid was made to the Heritage Lottery Fund for Stage 1 of a Parks for People grant and major work was begun on the park to fulfill Salford City Council's stated vision to "create an attractive, well used park for 21st century living providing a place for enjoyment, inspiration, reflection and a source of local pride...restore Peel Park as far as possible to the structure of 1890, reintroduce some of its historic features by reestablishing the links between recreation and learning through a programme of activities and links with the Salford Museum and Art Gallery". The second stage bid was submitted to the Heritage Lottery Fund early March 2015, which, if successful, could provide over £2 million to restore the park and provide a park keeper.

== Atmosfield Festival ==
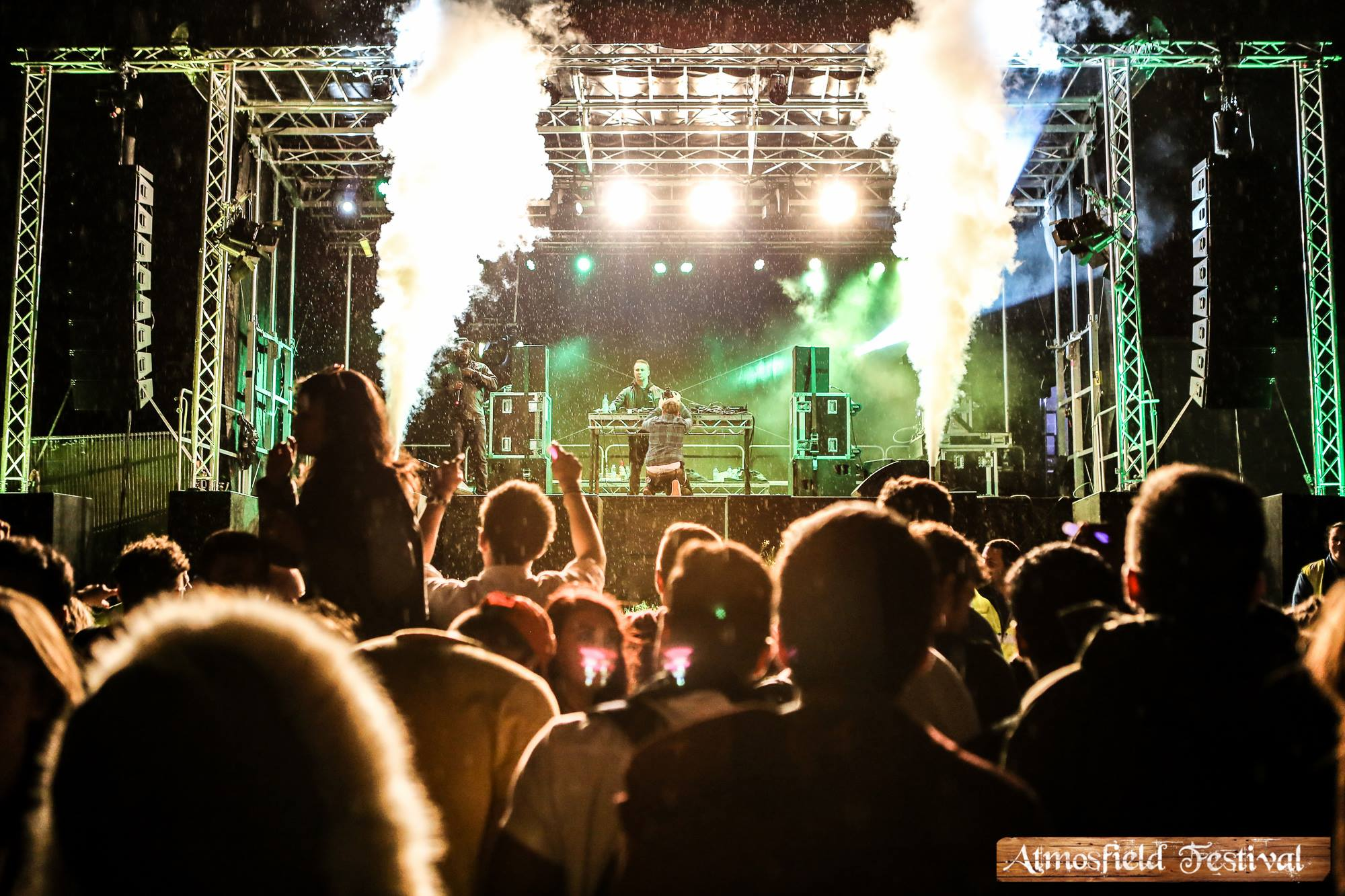
Matrix and Futurebound headlining the main stage

In May 2015, Peel Park was host to the first Atmosfield music festival for the University of Salford. Three stages of music featured local artists such as: Matrix and Futurebound, MistaJam, TCTS, Nick Coulson, The Hoosiers and Noasis (an Oasis tribute band). On both the Main Stage and Hidden Forest stage students were given the opportunity to perform. BPM: Big People Music, a music collective in Manchester hosted the Under the Earth stage which featured Lil Silva, Paleman and Madam X. The festival was criticised by the organiser of Salford Music Festival as tickets to the event were only available to Salford students. The event occupied a small section of the park with the rest open to the public.

== Facilities ==
The park today includes the David Lewis Sports Ground and has the following facilities available:

- Football pitches
- Equipped play area for 4–14 year olds

== Features ==
- Floral features
- Carpet bedding
- Two modern sculptures which are part of the Irwell Sculpture Trail - The Fabric of Nature by Julia Hilton and Monument to the Third Millennium by Adrian Moakes
- Marie Curie Field of Hope
- Flood obelisk (1866)

== Bibliography ==
Wyke, Terry; Cocks, Harry (2005). Public Sculpture of Greater Manchester. Liverpool: Liverpool University Press. ISBN 0-85323-567-8.
