= Worsley New Hall =

Former mansion and gardens now the site of RHS Garden Bridgewater

Coordinates: 53.4999°N 2.3988°W

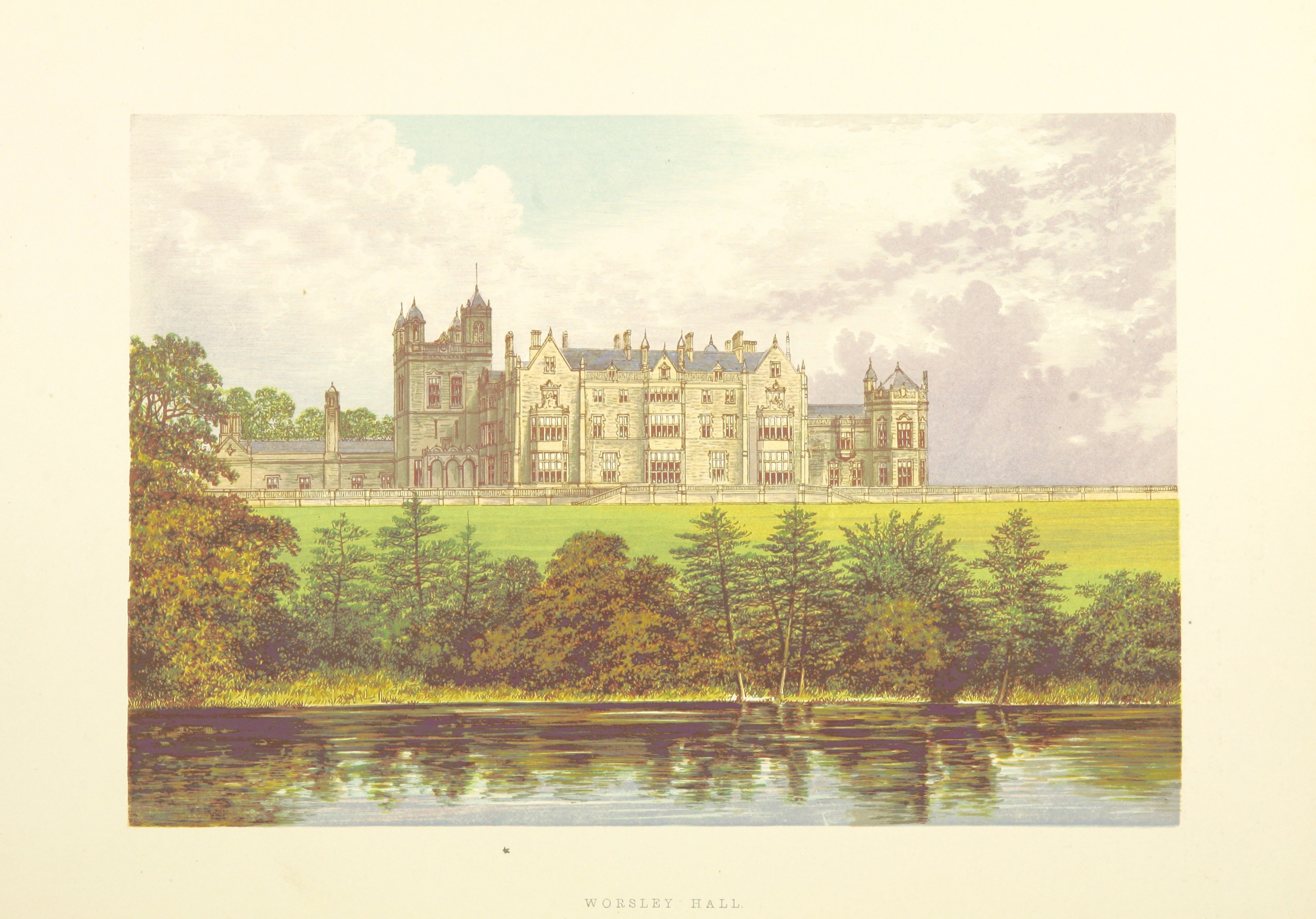
Worsley New Hall in 1868

Worsley New Hall is a former mansion and gardens by the Bridgewater Canal in Worsley, Greater Manchester, England, 8 miles (13 km) west of Manchester. The gardens were renovated by the Royal Horticultural Society and opened as RHS Garden Bridgewater in 2021.

== Construction ==
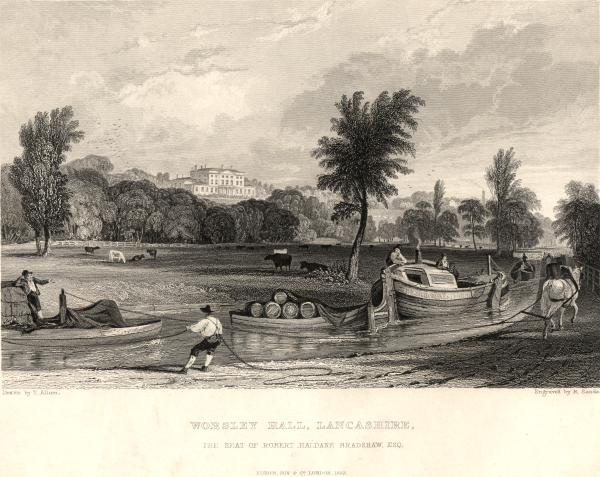
Brick Hall in 1833

In the 16th or early 17th century, Worsley Old Hall was constructed as the manor house for the Worsley estate. The estate was inherited by Francis Egerton, 3rd Duke of Bridgewater in 1748 and he commissioned the construction of the so-called Brick Hall, a classical-style building, which was built in the 1760s.

The Brick Hall was replaced by Worsley New Hall, which was built for Francis Egerton, 1st Earl of Ellesmere. It was one of the biggest houses designed by Edward Blore. The foundations of the building were started in 1839, with the first stone laid in April 1840; the building was completed by 1846 at a cost of just under £100,000. The Brick Hall was demolished between December 1844 and August 1845, and Leigh Road now runs over the former site of the building.

Worsley New Hall was an Elizabethan Gothic-style mansion, faced with Hollington stone. The Hall was three stories high and had a symmetrical main block, with a wing for the family on one side and a servant wing and a tower on the other side. The plans are held at the Victoria and Albert Museum.

== Notable visitors ==
Queen Victoria visited the hall twice. The first visit was in October 1851, and was the first royal visit to the area in 150 years. Queen Victoria, accompanied by Arthur Wellesley, 1st Duke of Wellington, arrived at the New Hall by specially-built barge which had travelled from Patricroft station along the Bridgewater Canal. During the visit she met James Nasmyth at the New Hall. Queen Victoria's second visit was between 29 June and 2 July 1857, whilst she was attending the Art Treasures Exhibition, Manchester 1857. She planted a North American giant redwood tree in the New Hall's lawn in memory of the Duke of Wellington, and Princess Frederica Maria of Prussia planted an English Oak at the same time. However, the redwood did not grow well in the British climate.

Edward VII and Queen Alexandra visited when Edward was Prince of Wales in 1869. On 6 July 1909 they visited the hall to inspect the Territorial Army's East Lancashire division on hall grounds to the south of the Bridgewater Canal, after they had opened the Manchester Royal Infirmary.

== 20th century ==
During World War I, John Egerton, 4th Earl of Ellesmere lent the hall to the British Red Cross, and it was used as a hospital for injured soldiers. The grand rooms of the New Hall were used as wards, with food provided by the kitchen gardens and the terraced gardens and parkland used for recreation. The hospital closed in 1919.

In 1920, death duties led the 4th Earl to start auctioning off various items of furniture and fittings from the New Hall. Other furniture, and paintings, were relocated to Mertoun House, Stetchworth Park and Bridgewater House, Westminster, which were also owned by the Earl. The hall's library, and surplus furniture, were sold at auction in April 1921.

In 1923, the Worsley estate including the New Hall was sold to Bridgewater Estates Limited, a group of Lancashire businessmen, for £3.3 million. Attempts were made in the 1920s and 1930s to sell the New Hall which had been empty since the end of World War I, but no purchasers were found.

During World War II, the War Office requisitioned parts of the New Hall and the grounds. The 2nd and 8th Battalions of the Lancashire Fusiliers occupied the site in 1939 and 1940, with around 100 troops based at the site, using the Hall's basements as air raid shelters, and digging training trenches in the grounds. In 1941 and 1942 the 42nd and 45th County of Lancaster Home Guard Battalions used the site, practising street fighting in the hall, and storehouses for explosives were constructed in the grounds. The lake and other parts of the grounds were used for scouting, and were known as Middlewood Scout Camp. The hall also housed Dunkirk evacuees, and in 1944 American soldiers were based at the hall, preparing for D-Day.

In September 1943, a fire badly damaged the top floor of the New Hall. The building had also been damaged during the military occupation, with windows broken, interior furnishings used for firewood, and the Leigh Road entrance gates damaged. The house was also suffering from dry rot and subsidence due to mining.

== Demolition ==
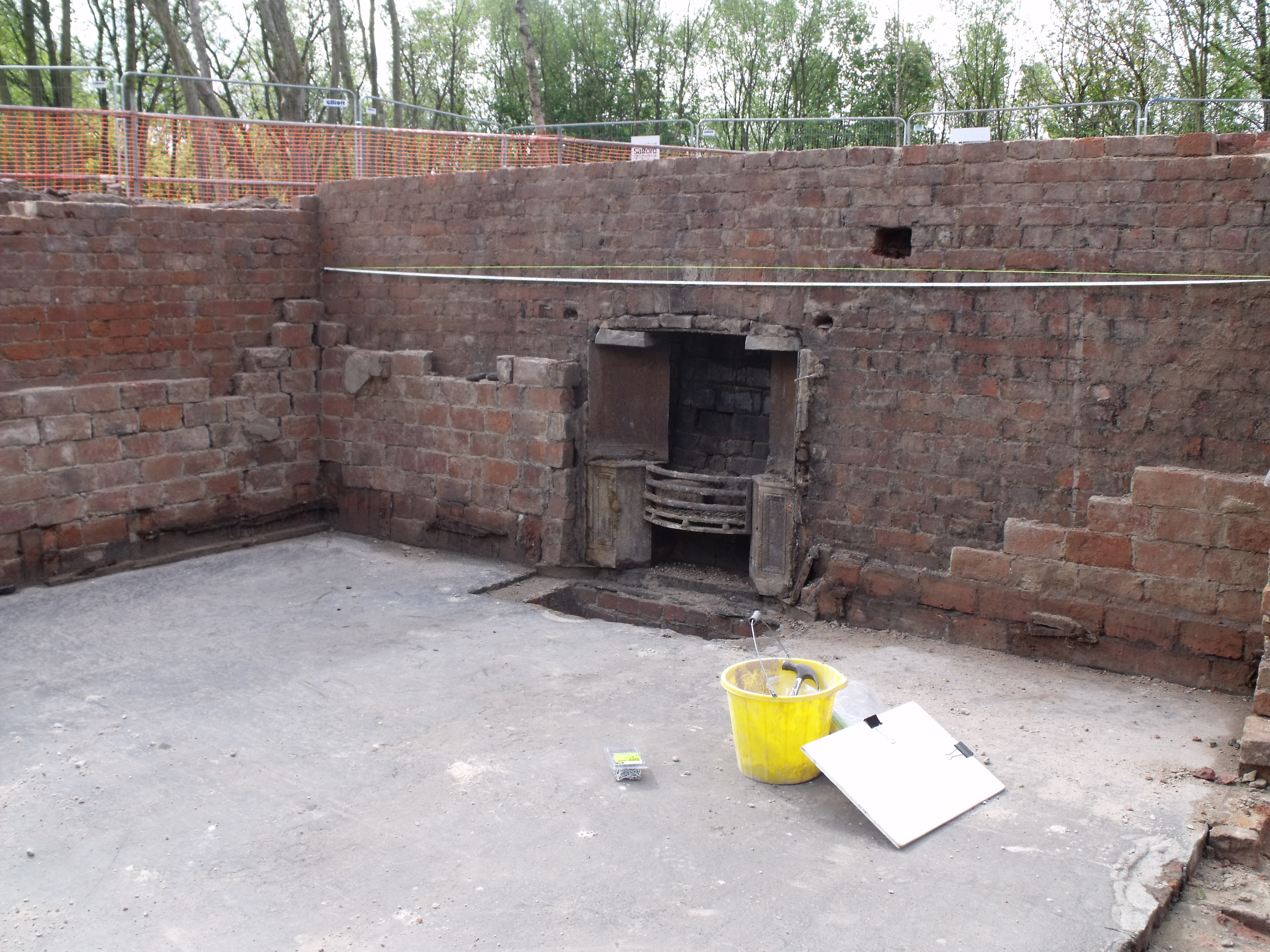
Excavated cellar chamber and fireplace, Worsley New Hall, 2012

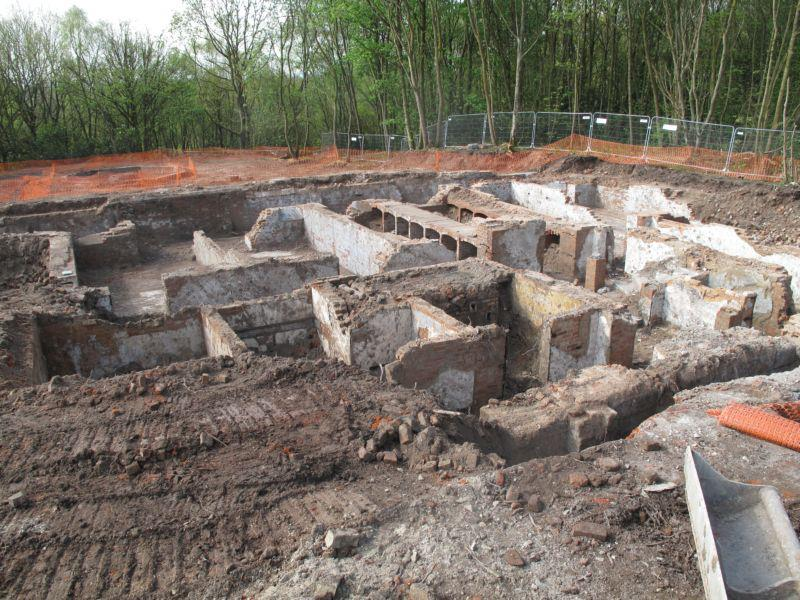
Overview of excavated cellars and foundations of Worsley New Hall

Calls for tenders to demolish the building were sent out in 1944 and the hall was sold to a scrap merchant from Ashton-in-Makerfield, Sydney Littler, for £2,500. Demolition started in 1946, and by 1949 the hall had been demolished to ground level, with debris used to fill in the basements. 800 tons of stone from the New Hall was used to construct council houses in Southfield, Yorkshire. A footbridge over Leigh Road which had connected the Old Hall and New Hall estates was demolished at the same time.

== Later use of the site ==
In 1951, the War Office again requisitioned part of the New Hall site, and built a reinforced concrete bunker as an Anti-Aircraft Operations Room (AAOR) where the servants' wing had been, along with two anti-aircraft radar masts. In 1956, the War Office purchased the site of the bunker and it was used by the Royal Navy as a food store. In 1961, the bunker was sold to Salford Corporation, and was used by them and Lancashire County Council as a control centre. In 1968, ownership of the bunker passed to Greater Manchester Fire Service; in 1985 they leased it to a local gun club as a shooting range.

The site of the New Hall and gardens remained in the ownership of Bridgewater Estates Ltd until 1984 when the company was acquired by Peel Holdings, now Peel Land and Property. Over the years there have been various ideas about how the site can be regenerated and put to new use, including a racecourse, hotel and spa.

In 2011, an archaeological excavation of the site of the New Hall, funded by Peel and carried out by the University of Salford, revealed that some of the basement of the house and its foundations were still in existence. Between March and December 2012, Peel also funded a community dig on the site and an archive and outreach project at the University of Salford which generated a number of oral history recordings and a guide to historical sources about the New Hall.

== Gardens ==
Worsley New Hall's formal landscaped gardens were set out in the early 1840s, with further developments over the next 50 years.

Landscaping included terrace gardens constructed by William Andrews Nesfield, who started work on the gardens in 1846. Six terraces existed by 1857, separated by stone balustrades, and linked with steps and gravel paths. The top two terraces were set out in a Parterre en Broderie style. The second terrace was a copy of a design by Dezallier d'Argenville; at the centre of this terrace was a bronze fountain designed by Val d'Osne that was previously displayed at The Great Exhibition in 1851. This fountain, along with two others on the fifth terrace, used water from Blackleach reservoir.

A croquet lawn and tennis court were near to the terraces. To the south of the terraces was landscaped parkland and a boating lake. The lake was enlarged by 1875, and featured an island grotto accessible by a footbridge.

To the west of the terraces, woodland separated the grounds of the New Hall from the gardener's cottage and kitchen gardens. The walled kitchen gardens were laid out in the early 1840s to provide vegetables, fruit and flowers to the residents of the New Hall. The kitchen garden was approximately ten acres in size and its perimeter walls were heated by flues using the Trentham wall case design, in order to create a warmer micro-climate. The kitchen gardens also featured potting sheds, and glasshouses containing cucumber plants, melons, grape vines and peach trees.

The cottage to house the head gardener for the New Hall estate was constructed in 1834, and was designed by Edward Blore. The Bothy was built in the late 19th century to house unmarried gardeners; a boiler in the cellar of the Bothy provided heating to the kitchen garden glasshouses. Both the cottage and the Bothy are still standing.

After the New Hall was abandoned by the Earls of Ellesmere in 1914, the gardens fell into disrepair, with the formal gardens becoming overgrown, and weathering damage to the fountain.

=== Royal Horticultural Society ===
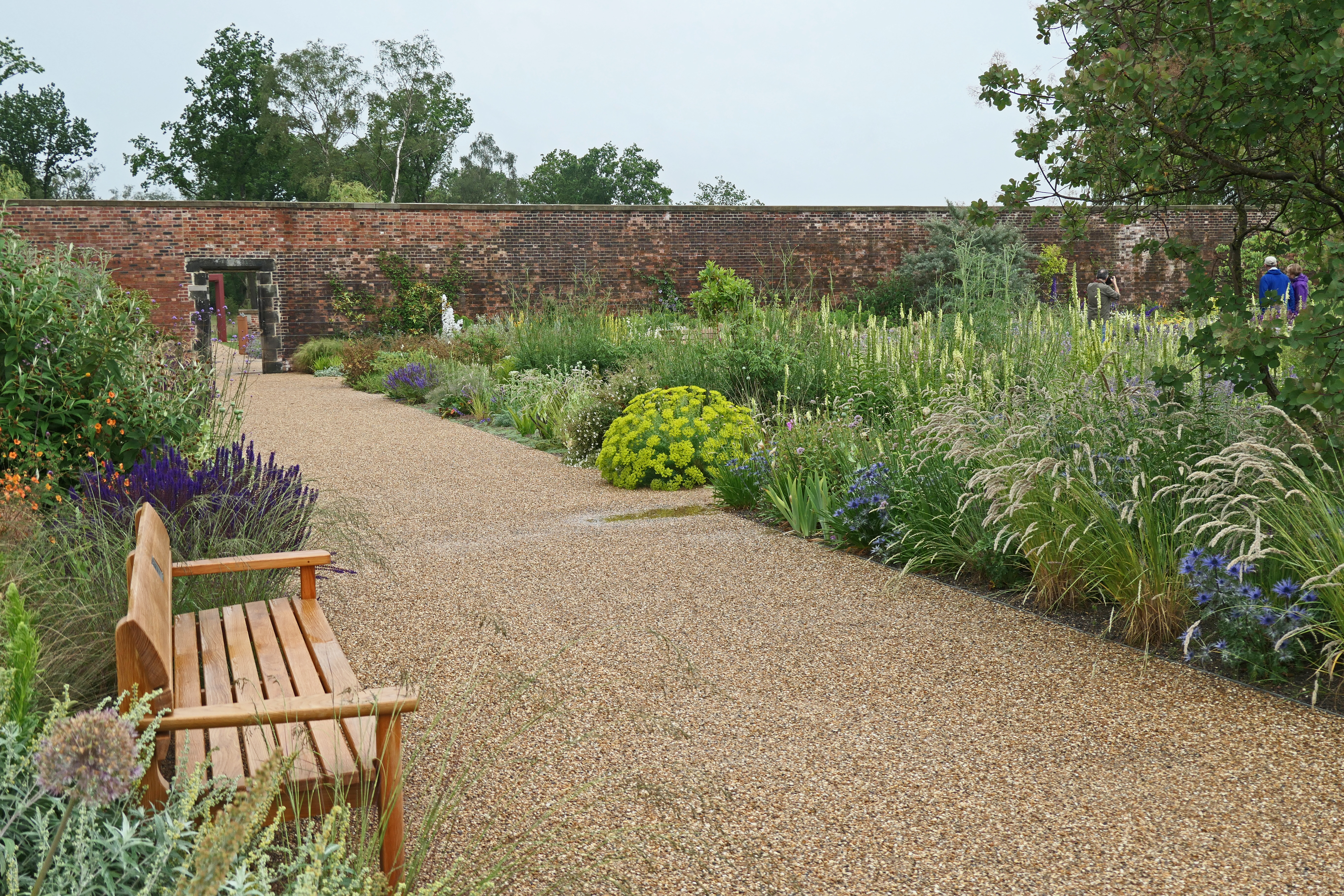
The restored kitchen garden in 2021

In October 2015 it was announced that the Royal Horticultural Society would renovate the 156-acre garden at Worsley New Hall, with a planned opening date of 2019 (now May 2021) under the name "RHS Garden Bridgewater". It will be the RHS's fifth garden, and is 156 acres (0.244 sq mi) in size. The renovation will cost £30 million, of which £19 million is from Salford Council, and it aims to be visited by around 1 million people per year once completed.

The new gardens are being designed by Tom Stuart-Smith. Initial plans include a new visitor building at the south end of the gardens; a new lake; a perennial meadow entrance garden set out as a web; a water garden; a new learning centre; and a café terrace. Additionally, the plans include the reconstruction of the walled garden, which will feature therapeutic, vegetable and flower gardens. Terraces between the ornamental lake and the former hall will be reinstated, as well as the tree-lined approach to the estate.

== See also ==
- List of botanical gardens
