= List of postage stamps of Guernsey =

The first stamps issued by Guernsey were forced upon the island by the shortage of British stamps in 1941 during the German occupation of the Channel Islands

Guernsey Post has issued postage stamps in the Bailiwick of Guernsey since its creation in 1969 when the postal service was separated from the Royal Mail. From 1983 Guernsey has issued stamps designated Alderney.

== Early issues ==
In 1940 Guernsey was occupied by Wehrmacht forces and the supply of postage stamps from the United Kingdom ceased. Not wishing to use Feldpost stamps and with the local stocks running out, the first solution in December 1940 was to cut, diagonally stamps so turning a 2d stamp into two 1d stamps.

Then in 1941 a simple stamp design was created by E.W. Vaudin with the main design adopted by both Jersey and Guernsey and feature three heraldic lions, a form of resistance against the occupation as the shield is that of both Guernsey and of the Duke of Normandy, the stamps also include four small V's for victory.

| Date | Name | Denominations |
|---|---|---|
| 1941 | Definitive coat of arms | ½d, 1d |
| 1944 | Definitive coat of arms | 2½d |

In 1947, for the 3rd anniversary of liberation, the Royal Mail issued two stamps, designed primarily for use in the Channel Islands depicting the gathering of Vraic (seaweed).

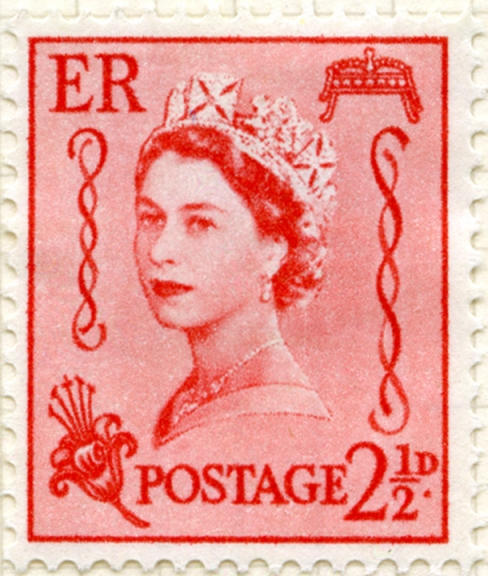
1958 country definitive stamp

| Date | Name | Denominations |
|---|---|---|
| 1947 | Gathering Vraic | 1d, 2½d |

In 1958 the idea of Country definitives resulted in regional postage stamps being printed in Britain. Eric Piprell designed the Guernsey stamps. These show the Crown of William the Conqueror and the Guernsey lily.

== Guernsey Post ==
=== 1969-1989 ===
==== Pre decimal ====
| Date | Name | Denominations |
|---|---|---|
| 1969 | Definitive | ½d, 1d, 1½d, 2d, 3d, 4d, 5d, 6d, 9d, 1/-, 1/9, 2/6, 5/-, 10/-, £1 |
| 1969 | Isaac Brock | 4d, 5d, 1/9, 2/6 |
| 1969 | Postage due | 1d, 2d, 3d, 4d, 5d, 6d, 1/- |
| 1970 | Definitive | 1d 1/6 |
| 1970 | Liberation 25 | 4d, 5d, 1/6 |
| 1970 | Agriculture | 4d, 5d, 9d, 1/6 |
| 1970 | Christmas churches | 4d, 5d, 9d, 1/6 |

==== Decimal ====
1971-9
| Date | Name | Denominations |
|---|---|---|
| 1971 | Definitive | ½p, 1p, 1½p, 2p, 2½p, 3p, 3½p, 4p, 5p, 6p, 7½p, 9p, 10p, 20p, 50p |
| 1971 | Thomas de la Rue | 2p, 2½p, 4p, 7½p |
| 1971 | Christmas churches | 2p, 2½p, 5p, 7½p |
| 1971 | Postage due | ½p, 1p, 2p, 3p, 4p, 5p, 10p |
| 1972 | Mail Packets | 2p, 2½p, 7½p, 9p |
| 1972 | Guernsey breeders | 5p |
| 1972 | Wild Flowers | 2p, 2½p, 7½p, 9p |
| 1972 | Christmas Silver Wedding | 2p, 2½p, 7½p, 9p |
| 1973 | Mail Boats | 2½p, 3p, 7½p, 9p |
| 1973 | Air Service 50 | 2½p, 3p, 5p, 7½p, 9p |
| 1973 | Christmas | 2½p, 3p, 7½p, 20p |
| 1973 | Royal Wedding | 25p |
| 1974 | Definitive Militia | ½p, 1p, 1½p, 2p, 2½p, 3p, 3½p, 4p, 5½p, 6p, 8p, 9p, 10p |
| 1974 | RNLI 150 | 2½p, 3p, 8p, 10p |
| 1974 | U.P.U. 100 | 2½p, 3p, 8p, 10p |
| 1974 | Renoir Paintings | 3p, 5½p, 8p, 10p |
| 1975 | Definitive Militia | 20p, 50p, £1 |
| 1975 | Guernsey Ferns | 3½p, 4p, 8p, 10p |
| 1975 | Victor Hugo exile | 3½p, 4p, 8p, 10p |
| 1975 | Christmas | 4p, 6p, 10p, 12p |
| 1975 | Postage due | 8p |
| 1976 | Definitive Militia | 5p, 7p |
| 1976 | Lighthouses | 4p, 6p, 11p, 13p |
| 1976 | Europa, handicraft | 10p, 25p |
| 1976 | Views | 5p, 7p, 11p, 13p |
| 1976 | Christmas buildings | 5p, 7p, 11p, 13p |
| 1976 | Postage due | 6p, 15p |
| 1977 | Silver Jubilee | 7p, 35p |
| 1977 | Europa, landscapes | 7p, 25p |
| 1977 | Prehistoric | 5p, 7p, 11p, 13p |
| 1977 | St John Ambulance | 5p, 7p, 11p, 13p |
| 1977 | Postage due | ½p 1p 2p 3p 4p 5p 6p, 8p, 10p, 15p |
| 1978 | Old Prints | 5p, 7p, 11p, 13p |
| 1978 | Europa, monuments | 5p, 7p |
| 1978 | Coronation 25 | 20p |
| 1978 | Royal Visit | 7p |
| 1978 | Birds | 5p, 7p, 11p, 13p |
| 1978 | Christmas | 5p, 7p, 11p, 13p |
| 1979 | Definitive coins | ½p, 1p, 2p, 4p, 5p, 6p, 7p, 8p, 9p, 11p, 12p, 13p, 14p, 15p, 20p |
| 1979 | Europa, Communications | 6p, 8p |
| 1979 | Public Transport | 6p, 8p, 11p, 13p |
| 1979 | Post Office 10 | 6p, 8p, 13p, 15p |

1980-9
| Date | Name | Denominations |
|---|---|---|
| 1980 | Definitive | 10p, 11½p, 50p, £1, £2, |
| 1980 | Police 60 | 7p, 15p, 17½p |
| 1980 | Europa, Personalities | 10p, 13½p |
| 1980 | Guernsey Goats | 7p, 10p, 15p, 17½p |
| 1980 | Peter Le Lievre | 7p, 10p, 13½p, 15p, 17½p |
| 1981 | Definitive | £5 |
| 1981 | Butterflies | 8p, 12p, 22p, 25p |
| 1981 | Europa, folklore | 12p, 18p |
| 1981 | Royal Wedding | 3 x 8p 3 x 12p 25p |
| 1981 | Transport | 8p, 12p, 18p, 22p, 25p |
| 1981 | Disabled Persons | 8p, 12p, 22p, 25p |
| 1982 | Old Prints | 8p, 12p, 22p, 25p |
| 1982 | Societe Guernesiaise | 8p, 13p, 20p, 24p, 26p, 29p |
| 1982 | Scouting 75th | 8p, 13p, 26p, 29p |
| 1982 | Christmas | 8p, 13p, 24p, 26p, 29p |
| 1982 | Postage due | 1p, 2p, 3p, 4p, 5p, 16p, 18p, 20p, 25p, 30p, 50p, £1 |
| 1983 | Boys' Brigade 100 | 8p, 13p, 24p, 26p, 29p |
| 1983 | Europa, great works | 2 x 13p 2 x 20p |
| 1983 | Renoir 100 | 9p, 13p, 26p, 28p, 31p |
| 1983 | Shipping | 9p, 13p, 26p, 28p, 31p |
| 1984 | Definitive views | 3p, 4p, 9p, 10p, 13p, 14p, 20p, 40p, 50p, £1 |
| 1984 | Dame of Sark 100 | 9p, 13p, 26p, 28p, 31p |
| 1984 | Europa | 13p, 20½p |
| 1984 | Commonwealth | 9p, 31p |
| 1984 | Sir John Doyle 150 | 13p, 29p, 31p, 34p |
| 1984 | Christmas 12 days | 12 x 5p |
| 1985 | Definitive views | 1p, 2p, 5p, 6p, 7p,, 8p, 11p, 15p, 30p, £2 |
| 1985 | Fish | 9p, 13p, 29p, 31p, 34p |
| 1985 | Peace in Europe 40 | 22p |
| 1985 | Youth Year | 9p, 31p |
| 1985 | Europa, music | 14p, 22p |
| 1985 | Girl Guides 75 | 34p |
| 1985 | Christmas gift bearers | 12 x 5p |
| 1985 | Paul Jacob Naftel | 9p, 14p, 22p, 31p, 34p |
| 1986 | James de Sausmarez 150 | 9p, 14p, 29p, 31p, 34p |
| 1986 | Queen Elizabeth 60th | 60p |
| 1986 | Europa, nature | 10p, 14p, 22p |
| 1986 | Wedding | 14p, 34p |
| 1986 | Sport | 10p, 14p, 22p, 29p, 31p, 34p |
| 1986 | Museums | 14p, 29p, 31p, 34p |
| 1986 | Christmas carols | 12 x 6p |
| 1987 | Definitive views | 11p 15p |
| 1987 | Europa, architecture | 2 x 15p 2 x 22p |
| 1987 | Edmund Andros 350 | 15p, 29p, 31p, 34p |
| 1987 | William the Conqueror 900 | 11p 2 x 15p 2 x 22p 34p |
| 1987 | John Wesley 200 | 7p 15p 29p 31p 34p |
| 1987 | Duke of Richmond map 200 | 14p, 29p, 31p, 34p |
| 1988 | Definitive views | 12p, 16p |
| 1988 | Shipping | 11p, 15p, 29p, 31p, 34p |
| 1988 | Europa, transport | 2 x 16p 2 x 22p |
| 1988 | F.C. Lukis 200 | 12p, 16p, 29p, 31p, 34p |
| 1988 | Powerboats | 16p, 30p, 32p, 35p |
| 1988 | Joshus Gosselin 200 | 12p 2 x 16p 2 x 23p 35p |
| 1988 | Christmas Ecclesiastical | 12 x 8p |
| 1989 | Definitive | 18p |
| 1989 | Europa, toys | 12p, 16p, 23p |
| 1989 | Definitive coil | UK |
| 1989 | Airport 50 | 2 x 12p 2 x 18p 2 x 35p |
| 1989 | Royal visit | 30p |
| 1989 | Great Western Railway | 12p, 18p, 29p, 34p, 37p |
| 1989 | Rain Forest animals | 18p, 29p, 32p, 34p, 37p |
| 1989 | Christmas decorations | 12 x 10p |

=== 1990-2009 ===
1990-99
| Date | Name | Denominations |
|---|---|---|
| 1990 | Definitive | Local |
| 1990 | Europa, Post Office | 2 x 20p 2 x 24p |
| 1990 | Stamps 150 | 14p, 20p, 32p, 34p, 37p |
| 1990 | Anson's navigation 250 | 14p, 20p, 29p, 34p, 37p |
| 1990 | WWF Sea life | 20p, 26p, 31p, 37p |
| 1990 | Christmas birds | 12 x 10p |
| 1991 | Definitive views | 21p, 26p |
| 1991 | First stamp 50 | 37p, 53p, 57p |
| 1991 | Europa space | 2 x 21p 2 x 26p |
| 1991 | Yacht Club 100 | 15p, 21p, 26p, 31p, 37p |
| 1991 | Nature conservation | 5 x 15p 5 x 21p |
| 1991 | Christmas children paint | 12 x 12p |
| 1992 | Definitive flowers | 3p, 4p, 5p, 10p, 16p, 20p, 23p, 40p, 50p, £1 |
| 1992 | Europa, Columbus | 2 x 23p 2 x 28p |
| 1992 | Elizabeth 40 | 23p, 28p, 33p, 39p |
| 1992 | Asterix | 16p, 23p, 28p, 33p, 39p |
| 1992 | Trams | 16p, 23p, 28p, 33p, 39p |
| 1992 | Christmas fayre | 12 x 13p |
| 1992 | R.G.A.H.S. 150 | 75p |
| 1993 | Definitive flowers | 1p, 2p, 6p, 7p, 8p, 9p, 24p, 28p, 30p, £2 |
| 1993 | Rupert Bear | 4 x 16p 4 x 24p |
| 1993 | Europa, art | 2 x 24p 2 x 28p |
| 1993 | Castle Cornet 350 | 16p, 24p, 28p, 33p, 39p |
| 1993 | Thomas de la Rue 200 | 24p, 28p, 33p, 39p, 61p |
| 1993 | Christmas windows | 12 x 13p |
| 1994 | Definitive flowers | 25p |
| 1994 | Europa, archaeology | 2 x 24p 2 x 30p |
| 1994 | Automobiles | 16p, 24p, 35p, 41p, 60p |
| 1994 | Post Office 25 | 16p, 24p, 35p, 41p, 60p |
| 1994 | Christmas toys | 6 x 13p 6 x 24p |
| 1994 | D-Day 50 | £2 |
| 1995 | Welcoming face | 8 x 24p |
| 1995 | Europa, 3D | 25p, 30p |
| 1995 | Liberation 50 | 16p, 24p, 36p, 41p, 60p |
| 1995 | Royal visit | £1.50 |
| 1995 | United Nations 50 | 4 x 50p |
| 1995 | Christmas UNICEF 50 | 2 x 13p 2 x 24p |
| 1996 | Definitive flowers | £3 |
| 1996 | Europa, women | 25p, 30p |
| 1996 | European Football | 2 x 16p 2 x 24p 2 x 35p 2 x 41p |
| 1996 | Modern Olympics 100 | 16p, 24p, 41p, 55p, 60p |
| 1996 | Film detectives 100 | 16p, 24p, 35p, 41p, 60p |
| 1996 | Christmas | 12 x 13p 24p 25p |
| 1996 | Hero of Upper Canada | 24p, £1 |
| 1997 | Definitive flowers | 18p, 26p |
| 1997 | Butterflies | 18p, 25p, 26p, 37p |
| 1997 | Europa, legends | 26p, 31p |
| 1997 | Self stick scenes | 18p, 25p, 26p |
| 1997 | Communications | 18p, 25p, 26p, 37p, 43p, 63p |
| 1997 | Christmas teddy bears | 15p, 25p, 26p, 37p, 43p, 63p |
| 1997 | Royal Golden Wedding | 15p, 25p, 26p, 37p, 43p, 63p |
| 1997 | Butterflies | £1 |
| 1997 | Pacific 97 | 30p, £1 |
| 1998 | Definitive maritime | £5 |
| 1998 | Tapestry 1000 | 10 x 25p |
| 1998 | Self stick scenes | 2 x local ^{1} 2 x UK ^{2} |
| 1998 | Royal Air Force 80 | 20p, 25p, 30p, 37p, 43p, 63p |
| 1998 | Europa, festivals | 20p, 25p, 30p, 37p |
| 1998 | Christmas tree 150 | 17p, 25p, 30p, 37p, 43p, 63p |
| 1998 | Football 150 | 30p £1.75 |
| 1999 | Definitive maritime | 1p, 2p, 3p, 4p, 5p, 6p, 7p, 8p, 9p, 10p, 40p, 50p, 75p, £1 |
| 1999 | Queen Mother | 10 x 25p |
| 1999 | Lifeboats 175 | 20p, 25p, 30p, 38p, 44p, 64p |
| 1999 | Herm Island | 20p, 25p, 30p, 38p |
| 1999 | Sandhurst Academy 200 | 20p, 25p, 30p, 38p, 44p, 64p |
| 1999 | Christmas carvings | 17p, 25p, 30p, 38p, 44p, 64p |
| 1999 | Royal Wedding | £1 |

^{1}Local - postage within the Bailiwick of Guernsey
^{2}UK - postage to the United Kingdom
^{3}EUR - postage to Europe
^{4}ROW - postage to the Rest of the World
^{5}INT - International postage

2000-09
| Date | Name | Denominations |
|---|---|---|
| 2000 | Definitive | 20p 30p £3 |
| 2000 | Future | 20p 25p 30p 38p 44p 64p |
| 2000 | Battle of Britain 60 | 21p, 26p, 36p, 40p, 45p, 60p |
| 2000 | Europa | 21p, 26p, 36p, 65p |
| 2000 | Candie Gardens | 10 x 26p |
| 2000 | Christmas churches | 18p, 26p, 36p, 40p, 45p, 65p |
| 2001 | Death of Queen Victoria | 21p, 26p, 36p, 40p, 45p, 65p |
| 2001 | Europa, water birds | 21p, 26p, 36p, 65p |
| 2001 | Dog club 100 | 22p, 27p, 36p, 40p, 45p, 65p |
| 2001 | self stick scenes | 5 x local, 5 x UK |
| 2001 | Guernsey Post | 22p, 27p, 36p, 40p, 45p, 65p |
| 2001 | Christmas lights | 19p, 27p, 36p, 40p, 45p, 65p |
| 2001 | Limited | £1 |
| 2002 | Definitive | 2 x £1 |
| 2002 | Circus | 22p, 27p, 36p, 40p, 45p, 65p |
| 2002 | Victor Hugo | 22p, 27p, 36p, 40p, 45p, 65p |
| 2002 | Accession Golden | 22p, 27p, 36p, 40p, 45p, 65p |
| 2002 | Wallace Le Patourel | 22p, 27p, 36p, 40p, 45p, 65p |
| 2002 | Tourism on Sark | 10 x 27p |
| 2002 | Christmas | 22p, 27p, 36p, 40p, 45p, 65p |
| 2002 | Pillar box 150 | £1.75 |
| 2002 | Queen Mother | £2 |
| 2003 | Definitive letters | £5 |
| 2003 | World War II | 22p, 27p, 36p, 40p, £1.50 |
| 2003 | Island Games | 22p, 27p, 36p, 40p, 45p, 65p |
| 2003 | Europa, Poster Art | 22p, 27p, 36p, 40p, 45p, 65p |
| 2003 | Prince William | 10 x 27p |
| 2003 | Christmas poem | 10p, 27p, 36p, 40p, 45p, 65p |
| 2003 | HMS Guernsey | £1.50 |
| 2004 | Self-stick clematis | 5 x local, 5 x UK |
| 2004 | Europa, holidays | 26p, 32p, 36p, 40p, 45p, 65p |
| 2004 | D-Day 60 | 26p, 32p, 36p, 40p, £1.50 |
| 2004 | Normandy Connection 800 | 26p, 32p, 36p, 40p, 45p, 65p |
| 2004 | Olympic Games | 32p, 36p, 45p, 65p, £1 |
| 2004 | Christmas innocence | 5 x 20p 32p, 36p, 40p, 45p, 65p |
| 2004 | Endangered, monkey | £2 |
| 2005 | William John Caparne 100 | 26p, 32p, 36p, 40p, 45p, 65p |
| 2005 | Memories of Liberation 60 | 26p, 32p, 36p, 40p, £1.50 |
| 2005 | Europa, Gastronomy | 26p, 32p, 36p, 40p, 45p, 65p |
| 2005 | Anniversary of Liberation 60 | 2 x £1 |
| 2005 | Definitive ship | £4 |
| 2005 | Sea Guernsey | 26p, 32p, 36p, 40p, 65p |
| 2005 | Christmas glass | 5 x 20p, 32p, 36p, 40p, 45p, 65p |
| 2005 | Endangered, shark | £2 |
| 2006 | Definitive Queen 80 | £10 |
| 2006 | Endangered, turtle, Ibis | £1, £1.50 |
| 2006 | Victoria Cross 150 | 29p, 34p, 38p, 42p, 47p, 68p |
| 2006 | Andy Priaulx | 29p, 34p, 42p, 45p, 47p, 68p |
| 2006 | Brunel 200 | 29p, 34p, 42p, 45p, 47p, 68p |
| 2006 | Europa, students | 29p, 34p, 42p, 45p, 47p, 68p |
| 2006 | Ramsar site, L'Eree | 29p, 34p, 42p, 45p, 47p, 68p |
| 2006 | Christmas 12 days | 6 x 22p, 29p, 34p, 42p, 45p, 47p, 68 |
| 2007 | Self-stick; Societe Guernesiaise 125 | 5 x local, 5 x UK |
| 2007 | Falklands War 25 | 32p, 37p, 45p, 48p, 50p, 71p |
| 2007 | Scouting 100 | 32p, 37p, 45p, 48p, 50p, 71p |
| 2007 | British F1 champions | 2 x 32p, 2 x 37p, 45p, 48p, 50p, 71p |
| 2007 | Endangered, Mountain gorilla | £2.50 |
| 2007 | Royal Diamond Wedding | 32p, 37p, 45p, 48p, 50p, 71p |
| 2007 | Landscapes | 32p, 37p, 45p, 48p, 50p, 71p |
| 2007 | Christmas | 6 x 27p, 32p 37p, 45p 48p 50p 71p |
| 2008 | Definitive flowers | 10p, 20p, 30p, 40p, 50p, £1, £2 |
| 2008 | Andy Priaulx | 3 x £1 |
| 2008 | Ramsar, Sark | 34p, 40p, 48p, 51p, 53p, 74p |
| 2008 | Mr. Men, Little Miss | 34p, 40p, 48p, 51p, 53p, 74p |
| 2008 | Letters | 34p, 40p, 48p, 51p, 53p, 74p |
| 2008 | Self-stick Abstract | 5 x local, 5 x UK |
| 2008 | Ford Model T 100 | 34p, 40p, 48p, 51p, 53p, 74p |
| 2008 | St Paul's Cathedral | 34p, 40p, 48p, 51p, 53p, 74p |
| 2008 | Christmas flowers | 6 x 29p, 34p, 40p, 48p, 51p, 53p, 74p |
| 2009 | Definitive Wild Flora | 1p, 2p, 3p, 4p, 5p, 6p, 7p, 8p, 9p, £3 |
| 2009 | Endangered, Leopard | £3 |
| 2009 | Darwin's discoveries | 36p, 43p, 51p, 54p, 56p, 77p |
| 2009 | Europa, astronomy | 36p, 43p, 51p, 54p, 56p, 77p |
| 2009 | Henry VIII 500 | 36p, 43p, 51p, 54p, 56p, 77p |
| 2009 | Guernsey stamps 40 | 36p, 43p, 51p, 54p, 56p, 77p |
| 2009 | Sea | 36p, 43p, 51p, 54p, 56p, 77p |
| 2009 | Christmas churches | 6 x 31p, 36p, 43p, 51p, 54p, 56p, 77p |

=== 2010-2029 ===
2010-2019
| Date | Name | Denominations |
|---|---|---|
| 2010 | Definitive abstract | 2 x GY^{1}, 2 x UK, EUR,^{3} ROW ^{4} |
| 2010 | Endangered, Asian elephant | £3.07 |
| 2010 | Europa, children's books | 45p, 50p, £2 |
| 2010 | Girl Guiding 100 | 36p, 45p, 48p, 50p, 58p, 80p |
| 2010 | National Trust of Guernsey 50 | 36p, 45p, 48p, 50p, 58p, 80p |
| 2010 | Evacuation 70 | 36p, 45p, 48p, 50p, 58p, 80p |
| 2010 | 2010 Commonwealth Games | 36p, 45p, 48p, 50p, 58p, 80p |
| 2010 | Christmas carols | 31p 36p, 45p, 48p, 50p, 58p, 80p |
| 2011 | Endangered, Blue whale | £3 |
| 2011 | The Royal British Legion 90 | 36p, 45p, 52p, 58p, 65p, 70p |
| 2011 | Europa, forests | 45p, 52p, £2 |
| 2011 | Royal Wedding | 2 x £2 |
| 2011 | Guernsey literary | 36p, 47p, 48p, 52p, 61p, 65p |
| 2011 | Sea Guernsey | 36p, 45p, 52p, 58p, 65p, 70p |
| 2011 | Sea Scout | 36p, 45p, 52p, 58p, 65p, 70p |
| 2011 | Christmas wonderland | 31p, 36p, 47p, 48p, 52p, 61p, 65p |
| 2011 | British F1 champions | 36p, 47p, 61p, 65p |
| 2012 | Diamond Jubilee | 36p, 47p, 48p, 52p, 61p, 65p |
| 2012 | Endangered, Bengal tiger | £3 |
| 2012 | Visit Guernsey | UK large, GY large, UK letter, GY letter, INT ^{5}20g, INT 40g |
| 2012 | Prince William 30 | 36p, 47p, 48p, 52p, 61p, 65p |
| 2012 | War of 1812 200 | 2 x £1 |
| 2012 | Yacht Club 150 | 39p, 52p, 53p, 59p, 69p, 74p |
| 2012 | Floral Guernsey 20 | 39p, 52p, 53p, 59p, 69p, 74p |
| 2012 | Floral Guernsey 20 | £3 |
| 2012 | Christmas story | 34p, 39p, 52p, 53p, 59p, 69p, 74p |
| 2013 | Endangered, Giant panda | £3 |
| 2013 | Marine life | 39p, 52p, 53p, 59p, 69p, 74p |
| 2013 | Marine life | £5 |
| 2013 | Sark gold postbox | £1 |
| 2013 | Postal transport | UK large, GY large, UK letter, GY letter, INT 20g, INT 40g |
| 2013 | Herm island | 40p, 53p, 55p, 63p, 71p, 79p |
| 2013 | Guernsey newspapers | 40p, 53p, 55p, 63p, 71p, 79p |
| 2013 | Royal baby | £3 |
| 2013 | West show | 40p, 53p, 55p, 63p, 71p, 79p |
| 2013 | Christmas | 35p, 40p, 53p, 55p, 63p, 71p, 79p |
| 2013 | Raymond Evison | 40p, 53p, 55p, 63p, 71p, 79p |
| 2014 | Year of the Horse | 40p, 53p, 55p, 63p, 71p, 79p |
| 2014 | Endangered, Orangutan | £3 |
| 2014 | Flowers over islands | UK large, GY large, UK letter, GY letter, INT 20g, INT 40g |
| 2014 | Europa, musical instruments | 40p, 53p, 55p, 63p, 71p, 79p |
| 2014 | Definitive landscapes | 5 x Local, 5 x UK |
| 2014 | Marine life | 41p, 54p, 55p, 66p, 74p, 83p |
| 2014 | Marine life | £3 |
| 2014 | Happy Postcrossing | INT |
| 2014 | Christmas | 34p, 41p, 54p, 55p, 66p, 74p, 83p |
| 2014 | Stories from the Great War | 41p, 54p, 55p, 66p, 74p, 83p |
| 2015 | Winston Churchill | 3 x £1 |
| 2015 | New Year | 41p, 54p, 55p, 66p, 74p, 83p |
| 2015 | Europa, toys | 41p, 54p, 55p, 66p, 74p, 83p |
| 2015 | Liberation | 41p, 54p, 55p, 66p, 74p, 83p |
| 2015 | Penny Black | £2 |
| 2015 | Paintings | 42p, 56p, 57p, 62p, 68p, 77p |
| 2015 | Sark | 42p, 57p, 62p, 68p, 77p, £1, £2 |
| 2015 | Christmas | 37p, 42p, 56p, 57p, 62p, 68p, 77p |
| 2015 | WW1 centenary | 42p, 56p, 57p, 62p, 68p, 77p |
| 2016 | Lunar year of the Monkey | 42p, 56p, 57p, 62p, 68p, 77p |
| 2016 | Endangered Species | £3 |
| 2016 | Bailiwick Life | GY Letter, GY Large, UK Letter, UK Large, EUR Letter, ROW Letter |
| 2016 | EUROPA Think Green | 64p |
| 2016 | Victor Hugo Toilers of the sea | 43p, 57p, 58p, 64p, 70p, 78p |
| 2016 | SEPAC Seasons | 43p, 57p, 64p, 70p |
| 2016 | 500 years of postal history | 43p, 57p, 58p, 64p, 70p, 78p, £2 |
| 2016 | Ramsar Herm | 43p, 57p, 58p, 64p, 70p, 78p |
| 2016 | Postcrossing | EUR, ROW |
| 2016 | Christmas | 38p, 43p, 57p, 58p, 64p, 70p, 78p |
| 2016 | Stories of the Great War (3) | 43p, 57p, 58p, 64p, 70p, 78p |
| 2017 | Lunar Year of the Rooster | 43p, 57p, 58p, 64p 70p, 78p |
| 2017 | Worldwide Fund for Nature | 43p, 57p, 64p, 70p |
| 2017 | Europa and Castle Cornet | 44p, 59p, 60p, 73p, 80p, 90p £3 souvenir sheet |
| 2017 | Shirts and Flags | 44p, 50p, 73p, 80p |
| 2017 | Guernsey Folklore | 44p, 59p, 60p, 73p, 80p, 90p £3 souvenir sheet |
| 2017 | Coastal Scenes | non-denominated (44p and 59p) |
| 2017 | Princess of Wales Royal Regiment | 44p, 59p, 60p, 73p, 80p, 90p £3 souvenir sheet |
| 2017 | World War I Remembrance | 44p, 59p, 60p, 73p, 80p, 90p |
| 2017 | QEII 70th Wedding Anniversary | 44p, 59p, 60p, 73p, 80p, 90p |
| 2017 | Christmas 2017 'Good King Wenceslas' | 39p, 44p, 59p, 60p, 73p, 80p, 90p |
| 2018 | Lunar New Year: Year of the Dog 2018 | 6 stamps |
| 2018 | Endangered Species: Black Rhinoceros | 1 stamp |
| 2018 | Post & Go: Bailiwick Flowers | 6 stamps |
| 2018 | RAF 100 Years; 201 Squadron (Guernsey's Own) | 6 stamps |
| 2018 | Europa: Bridges | 6 stamps |
| 2018 | Royal Wedding: HRH Prince Henry of Wales & Meghan Markle | 2 stamps |
| 2018 | SEPAC; Spectacular Scenery | 6 stamps |
| 2018 | 70th Birthday of Prince Charles | 6 stamps |
| 2018 | Guernsey Christmas: The Nutcracker and the Mouse King | 7 stamps |
| 2018 | Stories of the Great War Part 5 | 6 stamps |
2019
| 2019 | Lunar New Year: Year of the Pig 2019 | 6 stamps |
| 2019 | John Wilson, Architect | 8 stamps |
| 2019 | 50th Anniversary of the Guernsey Old Car Club | 6 stamps |
| 2019 | Europa: National Birds | 6 stamps |
| 2019 | 200th Anniversary of Queen Victoria and Prince Albert | 6 stamps |
| 2019 | 50th Anniversary of the Moon Landings | 4 stamps |
| 2019 | 50th Anniversary of HRH The Prince of Wales Investiture | 1 stamp |
| 2019 | SEPAC: Old Residential Houses/Hauteville House | 6 stamps |
| 2019 | 50th Anniversary - Postal Independence (Philatelic) | 6 stamps |
| 2019 | 50th Anniversary - Postal Independence (postal) | 6 stamps |
| 2019 | Guernsey Christmas | 7 stamps |

2020-
| Date | Name | Denominations |
|---|---|---|
| 2020 | Lunar: Year of the Rat | 6 stamps |
| 2020 | 250th Beethoven 1 | £1 |
| 2020 | Bailiwick Fishing Boats | 6 stamps |
| 2020 | Mail Ships | 6 stamps |
| 2020 | Endangered Species: Kordofan Giraffe | £3 |
| 2020 | Liberation 75 | 6 stamps |
| 2020 | 250th Beethoven 2 | 1 stamp |
| 2020 | 100th Rupert Bear | 6 stamps |
| 2020 | 250th Beethoven 3 | 1 stamp |
| 2020 | SEPAC: Artworks in National Collection | 6 stamps |
| 2020 | #GuernseyTogether | 7 stamps |
| 2020 | Guernsey Christmas | 7 stamps |
| 2020 | 250th Beethoven 4 | 1 stamp |
2021
| 2021 | Lunar: Year of the Ox | 6 stamps |
| 2021 | Clematis Gold: C.Sarah Elizabeth | 1 stamp |
| 2021 | Bailiwick Planes | 6 stamps |
| 2021 | 100 years Royal British Legion 1 | £1 |
| 2021 | Europa: Endangered Native Wildlife | 8 stamps |
| 2021 | Her Majesty The Queen's 95th Birthday | 6 stamps |
| 2021 | 100 years Royal British Legion 2 | £1 |
| 2021 | Postcrossing 2021 | 3 stamps |
| 2021 | Sark: Dark Skies | 6 stamps |
| 2021 | 100 years Royal British Legion 3 | £1 |
| 2021 | SEPAC: Old Maps | 6 stamps |
| 2021 | Guernsey Christmas | 7 stamps |
| 2021 | 100 years Royal British Legion 4 | £1 |

== See also ==
- Postage stamps and postal history of Guernsey
- List of postage stamps of Alderney
- Postage stamps and postal history of Jersey
