= Walker Collection =

The Walker Collection is a collection of philatelic material relating to the Second World War German occupation issues of the Channel Islands that forms part of the British Library Philatelic Collections. The collection is mainly of Guernsey material. It was formed by G.L. Walker and donated to the British Museum in 1948.

== See also ==
- Postage stamps and postal history of Jersey
- Postage stamps and postal history of Guernsey
