= Keith Weed =

British businessman

Keith Weed CBE
- Born: United Kingdom
- Education: Liverpool University
- Occupations: Businessman and President of Royal Horticultural Society

Keith Charles Frederick Weed CBE (born 1961) is a British businessman who was Unilever's former CMCO, a role he held from 2010 to 2019. In 2020, Weed was appointed president and chairman of the Royal Horticultural Society.

== Education ==
Weed obtained a Bachelor of Engineering with First Class Honours from Liverpool University in 1983. In 2012 he was awarded an Honorary Doctorate from Southampton Solent University for his contributions to business.

== Career ==
Weed worked as an engineer after graduating university before joining Unilever in 1983 as a marketer. During his career at Unilever, he has been chairman of Lever Fabergé and chairman of Unilever Export. He has worked for Unilever in the UK, France, the United States, both in global and regional roles across general management and marketing. In 2012 he was global head of Home Care & Hygiene. As Unilever's Chief Marketing and Communications Officer, Weed sat on Unilever's executive board with the Marketing, Communications and Sustainable Business teams reporting to him.

As CMCO, Weed pioneered new ways of integrating sustainability in business and led the creation of a "sustainable living plan". This plan sought to grow Unilever, reduce its environmental footprint, and increase its social impact. He also dissolved Unilever's corporate social responsibility department and integrated sustainable growth throughout Unilever's business. In 2014, Weed gave a TED Talk about the global issue of climate change and argued that sustainability and economic growth can go hand-in-hand.

Weed also directed advances in digital and influencer marketing and technologies within Unilever. He is committed to tackling stereotypes – gender and beyond – in advertising through Unilever's #Unstereotype initiative. As a part of this initiative, he architected the Unstereotype Alliance. Weed co-created this alliance with the help of UN Women, and united 24 companies in an effort to remove the portrayal of unhelpful stereotypes from their advertising by 2020.

In 2017, he was voted as the Marketers' Marketer of the Year by Campaign readers. He was also voted Global Marketer of the Year 2017 by the World Federation of Advertisers. Additionally, Weed was named the World's Most Influential CMO in 2017 and 2018 by Forbes. In 2018, Weed also received The Drum's Lifetime Achievement Award and featured in the Top 50 Financial Times HERoes list as a Champion of Women in Business.

Outside Unilever, Weed worked as the president of the Advertising Association, a fellow of The Marketing Society, of which he was president from 2003 to 2006. He was a non-executive director of Sun Products Corporation from 2008 to 2016.

== Current positions ==
In 2019, Weed took up a non-executive director role at WPP plc.

In 2020, he was named president and chairman of the Royal Horticultural Society and joined the board of Sainsbury's as a non-executive director.

Weed was appointed Commander of the Order of the British Empire (CBE) in the 2021 New Year Honours list for services to the advertising and marketing industry.

In 2021 he became a trustee of the Leverhulme Trust.

In 2022 he was appointed Chair of the UK Chapter of the Unstereotype Alliance.

In 2025, Weed was recognised in the Institute of Practitioners in Advertising (IPA) Honours List, receiving an Honorary Fellowship.

He is also currently chairman of Business in the Community International, a board of trustees director for Business in the Community, a board director of the Effies., a trustee of Grange Park Opera and is a fellow of the Institute of Mechanical Engineers.
