= List of postage stamps of Alderney =

Alderney forms part of the Bailiwick of Guernsey and since 1969 when Royal Mail relinquished authority to Guernsey Post has relied on postal services provided by Guernsey. In 1983 Guernsey Post issued its first stamps designated Alderney.

== History ==
Alderney is the second largest island in the Bailiwick of Guernsey. Guernsey Post has issued postage stamps since its creation in 1969 when the postal service was separated from the Royal Mail.

In 1983 Guernsey issued its first stamps designated Alderney, for use from Alderney, although they are valid for use from any island in the Bailiwick of Guernsey.

== Postage stamps issued ==
=== 1983 - 1999 ===
Date	Name	Denominations
1983	Definitive, island scenes	1p, 4p, 9p, 10p, 11p, 12p, 13p, 14p, 15p, 16p, 17p, 18p
1984	Birds	9p, 13p, 26p, 28p, 31p
1985	Airport 50	9p, 13p, 29p, 31p, 34p
1985	Garrison regiments	9p, 14p, 29p, 31p, 34p
1986	Forts	10p, 14p, 31p, 34p
1987	Shipwrecks	11p, 15p, 29p, 31p, 34p
1989	Definitive, island scenes	20p
1989	Bastide survey 250	12p, 18p, 27p, 32p, 35p
1990	HMS Alderney ships	14p, 20p, 29p, 34p, 37p
1991	Definitive, island scenes	21p
1991	Casquets lighthouses	21p, 26p, 31p, 37p, 50p
1992	Definitive, island scenes	23p
1992	Battle of La Hogue 300	23p, 28p, 33p, 50p
1992	Endangered marine life	24p, 28p, 33p, 39p
1993	Definitive, island scenes	24p, 28p
1994	Definitive, flora and fauna	1p, 2p, 3p, 4p, 5p, 6p, 7p, 8p, 9p, 10p
1995	Definitive, flora and fauna	£2
1995	Tommy Rose 100	3 x 35p, 3 x 41p
1995	Return of Islanders	£1.65
1996	30th Signal Regiment	24p, 41p, 60p, 75p
1996	Cats	16p, 24p, 25p, 35p, 41p, 60p
1997	Definitive, flora and fauna	18p, 25p, 26p
1997	Garrison 1	2 x 18p, 2 x 25p, 2 x 26p, 2 x 31p
1997	Cricket 150	18p, 25p, 37p, 43p, 63p
1998	Definitive, flora and fauna	20p
1998	Diving club 25	20p, 30p, 37p, 43p, 63p
1998	Garrison 2	2 x 20p, 2 x 25p, 2 x 30p, 2 x 37p
1999	Garrison 3	2 x 20p, 2 x 25p, 2 x 30p, 2 x 38p
1999	SS Stella 100	25p, £1.75
1999	Solar eclipse	20p, 25p, 30p, 38p, 44p, 64p

=== 2000 - 2009 ===
Date	Name	Denominations
2000	Garrison 4	2 x 21p, 2 x 26p, 2 x 36p, 2 x 40p
2000	Peregrine falcon	21p, 26p, 34p, 38p, 44p, 64p
2000	The Wombles	21p, 26p, 36p, 40p, 45p, 65p
2000	Queen Mother 100	£1.50
2001	Community services 1	22p, 27p, 36p, 40p, 45p, 65p
2001	Golf club 30	22p, 27p, 36p, 40p, 45p, 65p
2001	Garrison 5	2 x 22p, 2 x 27p, 2 x 36p, 2 x 40p
2002	Golden Jubilee	£2
2002	Migrating birds 1	22p, 27p, 36p, 40p, 45p, 65p
2002	Casquets lighthouses	22p, 27p, 36p, 45p, 65p
2002	Community services 2	22p, 27p, 36p, 40p, 45p, 65p
2003	Coronation 50	£2
2003	Powered flight 100	22p, 27p, 36p, 40p, 45p, 65p
2003	Migrating birds 2	22p, 27p, 36p, 40p, 45p, 65p
2003	Community services 3	22p, 27p, 36p, 40p, 45p, 65p
2004	Fungi	22p, 27p, 36p, 40p, 45p, 65p
2004	FIFA 100	26p, 32p, 36p, 40p, 45p, 65p
2004	Migrating birds 3	26p, 32p, 36p, 40p, 45p, 65p
2004	Community services 4	26p, 32p, 36p, 40p, 45p, 65p
2005	Hans Christian Andersen 200	26p, 32p, 36p, 40p, 65p
2005	Battle of Trafalgar 200	26p, 32p, 36p, 40p, 45p, 65p
2005	Migrating birds 4	26p, 32p, 36p, 40p, 45p, 65p
2005	Evacuees 60	£2
2006	Definitive, coral	1p, 2p, 3p, 4p, 5p, 6p, 7p, 8p, 9p, 10p, £1, £2
2006	The Once and Future King	29p, 34p, 38p, 42p, 47p, 68p
2006	Elizabeth II 80	2 x 29p, 2 x 34p, 2 x 42, 2 x 45p
2006	Resident birds 1	29p, 34p, 42p, 45p, 47p, 68p
2007	Definitive coral	20p, 40p, 50p, £4
2007	Ramsar site West Coast and Burhou	32p, 37p, 45p, 48p, 50p, 71p
2007	Resident birds 2	32p, 37p, 45p, 48p, 50p, 71p
2007	Rudyard Kipling "Just so"	32p, 37p, 45p, 48p, 50p, 71p
2008	Butterflies	34p, 40p, 48p, 51p, 53p, 74p
2008	Resident birds 3	34p, 40p, 48p, 51p, 53p, 74p
2008	Alderney stamps 25	34p, 40p, 48p, 51p, 53p, 74p
2008	Aurigny 40	34p, 40p, 48p, 51p, 53p, 74p
2008	Lion rampant	£5
2009	Bees	36p, 43p, 51p, 54p, 56p, 77p
2009	Resident birds 4	36p, 43p, 51p, 54p, 56p, 77p
2009	Naval aviation 100	36p, 43p, 51p, 54p, 56p, 77p
2009	Arthur Conan Doyle 150	36p, 43p, 51p, 54p, 56p, 77p

=== 2010 - 2019 ===
Date	Name	Denominations
2010	Dragonflies	36p, 45p, 56p, 66p, 75p, 83p
2010	Battle of Britain 70	36p, 45p, 48p, 50p, 58p, 80p
2010	Florence Nightingale	36p, 45p, 48p, 50p, 58p, 80p
2010	Peter Pan 150	36p, 45p, 48p, 50p, 58p, 80p
2010	Christmas carols	31p, 36p, 45p, 48p, 50p, 58p, 80p
2011	Hawk moths	36p, 45p, 52p, 58p, 65p, 70p
2011	Bailiwick Birds	36p, 45p, 48p, 52p, 58p, 65p
2011	Queen Elizabeth 85; Prince Philip 90	36p, 45p, 48p, 52p, 58p, 65p
2011	British Red Cross uniforms	36p, 47p, 48p, 52p, 61p, 65p
2011	Winter wonderland	31p, 36p, 47p, 48p, 52p, 61p, 65p
2012	RMS Titanic 100	36p, 47p, 48p, 52p, 61p, 65p
2012	Charles Dickens 200	36p, 47p, 48p, 52p, 61p, 65p
2012	Tiger moths	39p, 52p, 53p, 59p, 69p, 73p
2012	Alderney Harbour	39p, 52p, 53p, 59p, 69p, 73p
2012	Christmas story	34p, 39p, 52p, 53p, 59p, 69p, 73p
2013	Beetles	39p, 52p, 53p, 59p, 69p, 73p
2013	Coronation 60	40p, 53p, 55p, 63p, 71p, 79p
2013	Beatrix Potter	40p, 53p, 55p, 63p, 71p, 79p
2013	Rudolph the Red-Nosed; Reindeer	35p, 40p, 53p, 55p, 63p, 71p, 79p
2014	Ladybirds	40p, 53p, 55p, 63p, 71p, 79p
2014	Bayeux tapestry final	40p, 53p, 55p, 63p, 71p, 79p
2014	Prince George 1	2 x 55p
2014	Ian Fleming	41p, 54p, 55p, 66p, 74p, 83p
2014	Christmas meaning	36p, 41p, 54p, 55p, 66p, 74p, 83p
2015	Alice's Adventures in Wonderland	6 stamps
2015	Flora and Fauna	6 stamps
2015	Forts	6 stamps
2015	Christmas Stamps	7 stamps
2015	Her Majesty, The Longest Reigning Monarch	1 stamp
2015	70th Anniversary of Homecoming	1 stamp
2016	Longis Nature Reserve	6 stamps
2016	Her Majesty The Queen's 90th Birthday	6 stamps
2016	950 Years: Battle of Hastings	6 stamps
2016	Christmas Stamps	7 stamps
2017	1st Edition Alderney & Burhou Map	6 stamps
2017	Alderney Scenes	6 stamps
2017	Coastal Eclipses	6 stamps
2017	Carol	7 stamps
2018	50th Anniversary of the Wombles book	6 stamps
2018	Spring stamped	59p x 2
2018	65th Anniversary of the Queen's Coronation	46p, 62p, 63p, 76p, 85p, 94p
2018	Alderney Week	46p, 62p, 63p, 76p, 85p, 94p
2018	The Christmas Carol by Charles Dickens	7 stamps
2019	120 years: Sinking of the SS Stella	46p, 62p, 63p, 76p, 85p, 94p
2019	75th Anniversary of D-Day	48p, 65p, 66p, 80p, 90p, 98p
2019	200th Anniversary of John Keats	48p, 65p, 66p, 80p, 90p, 98p
2019	Alderney Christmas	43p, 48p, 65p, 66p, 80p, 90p, 98p
2019	100th Anniversary of Armistice Day	£2

== See also ==
- Postage stamps and postal history of Guernsey
- List of postage stamps of Guernsey
- Postage stamps and postal history of Jersey
