= Reginald Cory Memorial Cup =

- Country: United Kingdom
- Presented by: Royal Horticultural Society
- First award: 1923; 103 years ago
- Website: RHS People Awards

The Reginald Cory Memorial Cup is an annual award of the Royal Horticultural Society named after British horticulturalist Reginald Cory.

== Recipients ==
Year	Name	Notes	Ref.
1923			
1924			
1925			
1926			
1927			
1928			
1929			
1930			
1931			
1932			
1933			
1934			
1935			
1936			
1937			
1938			
1939			
1940			
1941			
1942			
1943			
1944			
1945			
1946			
1947			
1948			
1949			
1950			
1951			
1952			
1953			
1954			
1955			
1956			
1957			
1958			
1959			
1960			
1961			
1962			
1963			
1964			
1965			
1966			
1967			
1968			
1969			
1970			
1971			
1972			
1973			
1974			
1975			
1976			
1977			
1978			
1979			
1980			
1981			
1982			
1983			
1984			
1985			
1986			
1987			
1988			
1989			
1990			
1991			
1992			
1993			
1994			
1995			
1996			
1997			
1998			
1999			
2000			
2001			
2002			
2003			
2004	Raymond Evison		
2005			
2006			
2007			
2008			
2009			
2010			
2011			
2012			
2013	Charles Valin		
2014			
2015			
2016			
2017			
2018			
2019			
2020			
2021			
2022			
2023			
2024	Vance Hooper		
2025	Daniel Michael		
2026	John Valin		
