= Garden World Images =

Garden World Images, (GWI) previously known as the Harry Smith Collection, whose origins can be traced back to the early 1950s and is one of the oldest and largest libraries of horticultural/botanical colour photographs in the World. The library supplies images of flowers, plants and gardens to newspapers, TV shows, publishers and magazines around the world. GWI has been involved with hundreds of publications and influential books such as Dr. D. G. Hessayon's "Expert" series as well as all of the Greenfingers Guides.

GWI is run by Managing Director Tyrone McGlinchey FLS Linnean Society of London, who is also Vice Chairman of the Garden Media Guild. GWI is a majority Dutch owned picture library, the main shareholder being Floramedia, and the other shareholder is Tyrone McGlinchey. GWI is based in England.

== Harry Smith Collection ==
The library's origins date back to the early 1950s when Harry Smith (British horticultural photographer) starting building up a catalogue of images, mostly for supply to seed houses and to illustrate magazines such as Amateur Gardening and Garden News as well as books. In the period between 1950-1960s there were not many horticultural photographers working in colour, Valerie Finnis was one of the most respected- she was a contributor to Royal Horticultural Society magazines. Derek Fell also a photographer, originally worked with the 'eminent' Harry Smith during this period as PR executive with Hurst Seeds and lists him as an influence. It was not until after his death that the Harry Smith Collection was formally founded in 1974 by Dick Robinson and Anthony Huxley.

The Harry Smith Collection was an image supplier to the Royal Horticultural Society Herbarium image collection.
