= Raymond Evison =

British horticulturist

Raymond John Evison CBE VMH FLS is a nurseryman, clematis breeder, lecturer, author and photographer. Born in 1944 he started his horticultural career at the age of 15 in Shropshire and moved to the island of Guernsey to set up The Guernsey Clematis Nursery in 1984.

== Clematis Nursery ==
In his lifetime he has introduced over 200 clematis species and cultivars, and The Guernsey Clematis Nursery remains one of the largest specialist producers of young clematis plants and supplies plants worldwide, distributing its plants via both wholesale and retail channels.

Evison’s most recent clematis introductions have focused on compact ornamental clematis cultivars more suitable for small gardens and have been achieved via a joint venture with Danish rose specialist Poulsen Roser A/S, and more recently through his own company Raymond J. Evison Ltd.

His first book "Making the Most of Clematis" was issued in 1977. This was followed by "The Gardener's Guide to Growing Clematis" (1998), "Clematis for Everyone" (2000) Clematites du 3 millenaire and more recently “Clematis for Small Spaces”(2007).

Since the 1980s, Evison has had strong representation within numerous horticultural bodies both British and international. After senior level involvement in the International Plants Propagators Society (as a previous international president) and the National Council for Conservation of Plants and Gardens, he was the main driving force behind the formation of the International Clematis Society in 1984, for which he was president from 1989–1991 and is now an honorary fellow.

He has held various positions as chairman of Royal Horticultural Society Committees as well as being a member of the RHS Council for 16 years and he was elected a Vice President of the RHS in 2005.

At a local level within Guernsey he heads up a project targeting the restoration of a Victorian Walled Kitchen Garden as the President of The Guernsey Botanical Trust. He has also taken and supplied photographs of clematis and local wild flowers to the Guernsey Philatelic Bureau for reproduction on Guernsey postage stamps. In 2021 he set up the ‘Grow Guernsey Natives ‘ scheme for La Societe Guernesiaise, Botany Section, to conserve and produce rare Guernsey native plants, to save them for prosperity.

Raymond Evison still lives in Guernsey but travels widely both for business, plant hunting and lecture presentations on clematis.

== Honours ==
In 1995 he was awarded the RHS Victoria Medal of Honour for his outstanding service to British Horticulture.

He was awarded the RHS Reginald Cory Memorial Cup in 2004 for far-reaching work in breeding and developing new clematis cultivars.

In 2008 his book, “Clematis for Small Spaces”, earned him the Garden Media Guild award for Reference Book Of The Year.

2009 - 2013, Chairman of the RHS Woody Plant Committee.

2010 - 2013, Chairman of the RHS Plant Advisory Committee.

In 2012 he received the Achievement in Horticultural Award, Inst.of Horticulture, and in 2014, Contributor Award, Perennial Plant Assoc., USA.

In 2016 he was made a Hon Fellow, Kew Guild, and also received The Pearson Memorial Medal. Horticultural Trades Assoc., for his outstanding contributions to the Horticultural Trade, and was made a Fellow, The Linnean Society of London.

In 2019 he designed and planted a clematis garden for The Beijing Florascape Co Ltd., at the Beijing Expo.

In 2022 his company, The Guernsey Clematis Nursery Ltd., was granted a Royal Warrant by Appointment, His Royal Highness The Prince of Wales.

He has also been awarded RHS annual awards for exhibits of clematis including 6 Williams Memorial Medals and 2 Lawrence Medals .

He has displayed clematis at horticultural shows worldwide. His exhibits of clematis have been awarded 33 RHS Chelsea Show Gold medals to date (as at 2023).

He was appointed Officer of the Order of the British Empire (OBE) in the 2000 Birthday Honours for services to horticulture on Guernsey and Commander of the Order of the British Empire (CBE) in the 2024 New Year Honours for services to horticulture and Guernsey.

== Works ==
- “Making the Most of Clematis” (1977) ISBN 978-0-903001-69-4.
- “The Gardeners Guide to Growing Clematis” (1998) ISBN 978-0-7153-0639-0.
- “Clematis for Everyone” (2000) ISBN 978-0-903001-70-0.
- “Clematis for Small Spaces” (2007) ISBN 978-0-88192-851-8.
