= Encyclopedia of Conifers =

Encyclopedias of science

- Cover of Encyclopedia of Conifers Volume I, Volume II
- Author: Aris G. Auders, Derek P. Spicer
- Language: English
- Genre: Encyclopedia
- Publisher: Royal Horticultural Society in cooperation with Kingsblue Publishing Limited
- Publication date: Early 2012
- Media type: Print (Hardcover)
- Pages: 1,500
- ISBN: 978-1-907057-15-1

Encyclopedia of Conifers. A Comprehensive Guide to Conifer Cultivars and Species is an encyclopedia written by Aris G. Auders and Derek P. Spicer, published in 2012 for the Royal Horticultural Society. The two-volume, illustrated encyclopedia is a complete reference book covering all recognised conifer cultivars and species, both hardy and tropical. The 1,500-page work features names, synonyms, and brief descriptions, as well as information about height and spread after 10 years, where known, for over 8,000 cultivars and all 615 conifer species, plus their subspecies and varieties. Apart from the descriptive text, it is illustrated with more than 5,000 photographs.

== Publication history ==
The Encyclopedia of Conifers was written by Aris G. Auders, a conifer collector and photographer from Latvia, and Derek P. Spicer, Chairman of the British Conifer Society. The authors have been assisted by Lawrie Springate, International Conifer Cultivar Registrar at the Royal Horticultural Society (2004–2009), and Victoria Matthews, RHS International Registrar. The publisher is Kingsblue Publishing Limited.

== Illustration and design ==
Photography by the authors shows the general appearance of the plants, and in many cases detail special features. Many were photographed in summer and winter to show colour and texture changes through the seasons.
