= Postage stamps and postal history of the Isle of Man =

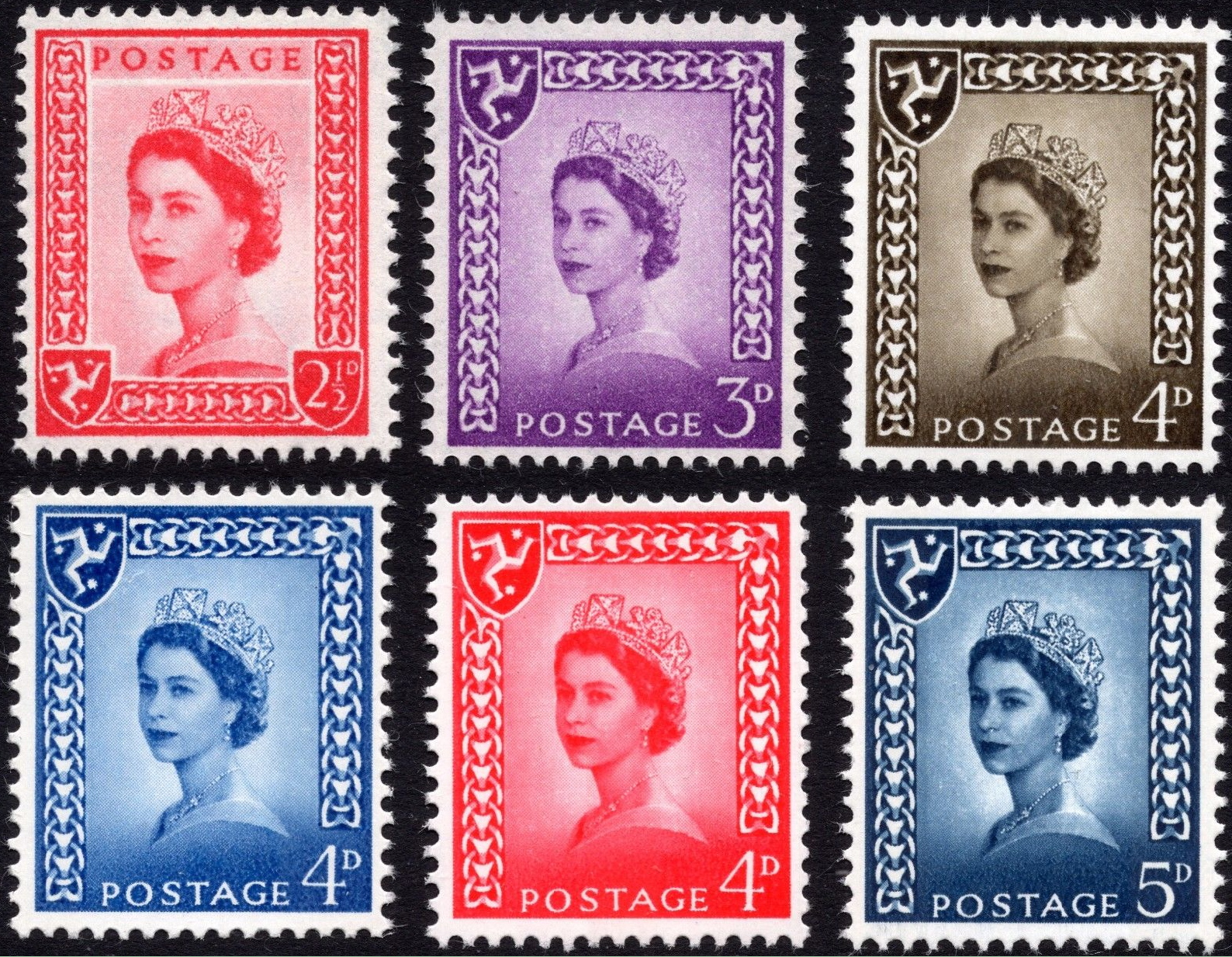
Regional stamps of the Isle of Man in use between 1958 and 1973

This is a survey of the postage stamps and postal history of the Isle of Man.

The Isle of Man is a self-governing British Crown dependency in the Irish Sea between the islands of Great Britain and Ireland. The island is about 32 miles (51 km) long and, at its widest, 14 miles (23 km) wide. It has been inhabited for over 8,500 years. The capital is Douglas. English is the main language spoken but the island has its own Manx language which is of Celtic origin. The Isle of Man parliament, known as Tynwald, is believed to be the oldest continuous parliamentary body in the world.

The postal history of the island pre-dates introduction of the first postage stamps in 1840. The island used British stamps until 1958 when regional issues began. The Isle of Man Post Office was founded in 1973 to secure postal independence and, since then, the island has issued its own stamps.

== Postal history ==
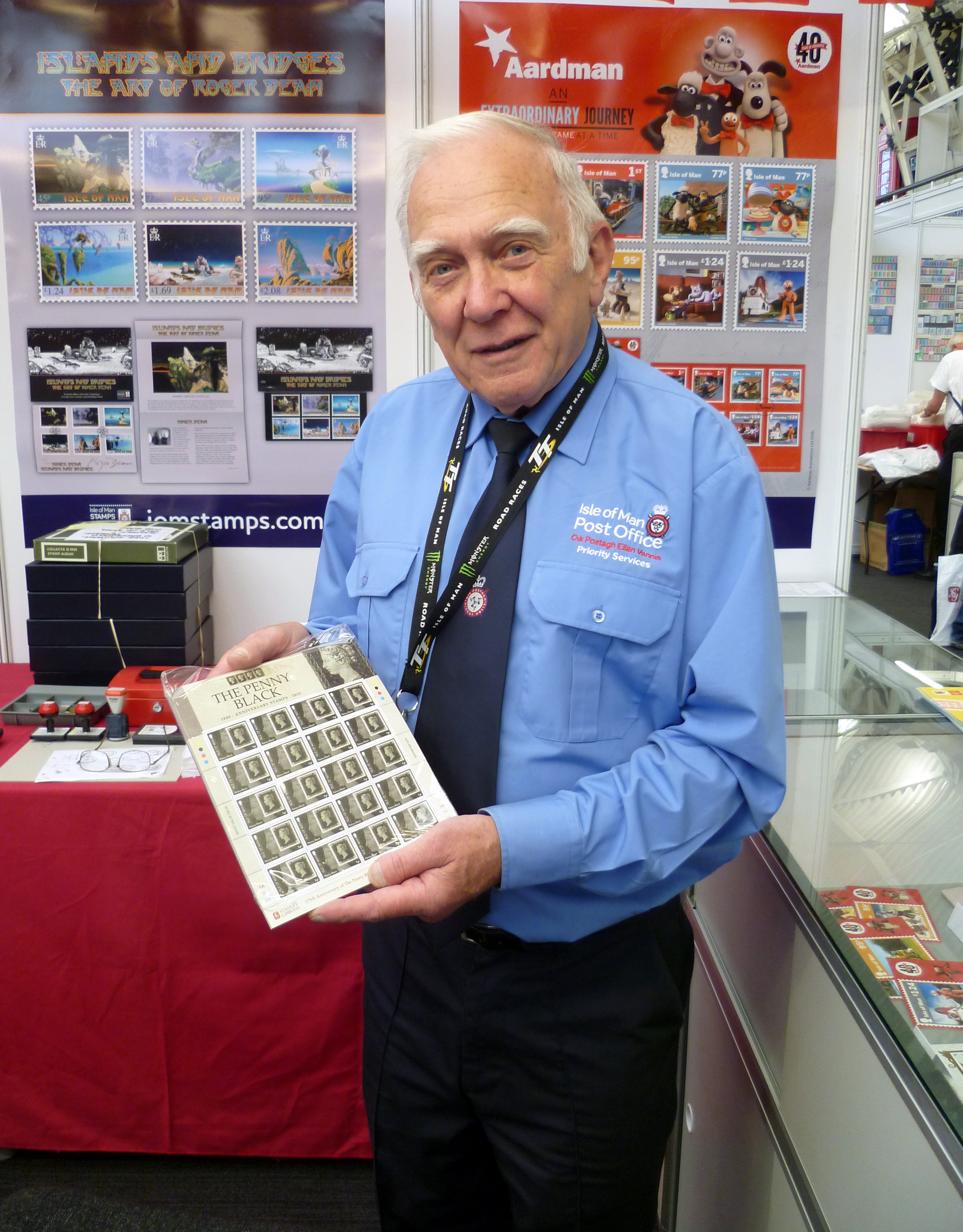
An Isle of Man Post Office employee with a sheet of stamps issued in 2015 to mark the 175th anniversary of the issue of the Penny Black

It is known that there was an official packet boat service between Whitehaven and Douglas after 1765 when the island was reclaimed by the British Crown, having been in private hands previously. The post office in Douglas was established as a sub-office of Whitehaven until 1822 when Douglas became a postal town in its own right after the packet boat service was transferred from Whitehaven to Liverpool. The earliest known handstamp from Douglas is dated c. 1767. Handstamp markings were similar to those used in Great Britain except they were worded Isle of Man. A local Penny Post system was introduced in 1832 with additional receiving offices opening in Castletown, Peel and Ramsey.

Like the rest of the United Kingdom, the Isle of Man began using British postage stamps on 6 May 1840. The island's postmark was a Maltese Cross to 1844 when Douglas office was allocated the numeral 407. In 1851, numerals 036 and 037 were allocated to Ramsey and Castletown respectively. During the two World Wars, the Isle of Man housed several prisoner-of-war camps and one of these, at Knockaloe, had a post office. The others all had cachets for transmission to Knockaloe.

The Isle of Man was included in the North West Postal Region and continued to use British stamps until the first regional stamps were issued by the Royal Mail on 18 August 1958. They were a red twopence halfpenny and a lilac threepence, both featuring a portrait of Queen Elizabeth II encompassed by a Celtic ring chain. In common with UK practice, the stamps were not inscribed with the country's name but did depict the Manx triskelion to enable identification with the Isle of Man. Similar regional stamps for the same values were issued in Guernsey and Jersey. Other regionals were issued in each Northern Ireland, Scotland and Wales but for a wider range of values.

On 5 July 1973, postal independence was granted. The Isle of Man Post Office was created and began issuing its own stamps from that day. The first issue was a fifteen pence commemorative which depicted the Vikings landing on the island in 938.

== Campaign for postal independence ==
The island's first stamps were issued approximately 50 years after campaigning for them had started. They had been perceived as promotional tools for the Manx identity. In the absence of stamps, postage labels – some measuring 2 by 1 1/2 inches (5.1 by 3.8 cm) – were affixed over the rear flaps of envelopes. Campaigning for stamps in the 1920s led to the first official approaches to the General Post Office between 31 May and 5 June 1930 when the GPO laid the Island's first submarine telephone cable. The idea was rejected because of fears that Scotland, Wales and Northern Ireland would want their own stamps too. To promote the fact that the Isle of Man was no longer isolated telephonically, therefore, Tynwald’s Publicity Board produced a postage label depicting a girl making a telephone call; the slogan, 'A Holiday Call from the Isle of Man'.

The Island's first experimental airmail service was started by a Railway Air Services Dragon Rapide on 20 August 1934. This operated between Manchester and Belfast. Letters weighing less than 2 ounces (57 g) were carried at no extra cost. The first regular airmail service from Liverpool was started on 1 February 1935 by Blackpool and West Coast Air Services Ltd.

== British postal strike ==
The Island's first officially authorised postage stamps were issued during Britain's first postal strike (20 January – 7 March 1971). Tourist souvenir supplier, Gordon Quirk, launched Post Manninagh on 20 January and was authorised on 27 January, though restricted to deliveries within the island. He adapted illustrated match box covers as stamps, guillotining from their edges words such as 'Foreign – Average Contents 30'. Quirk's first authorised mail deliveries outside the island began on 1 February. His first specifically designed stamp was produced on 15 February. Others followed. Post Manninagh's first airmail service started on 1 March, six days before the strike ended.

== Isle of Man Post Office stamps ==
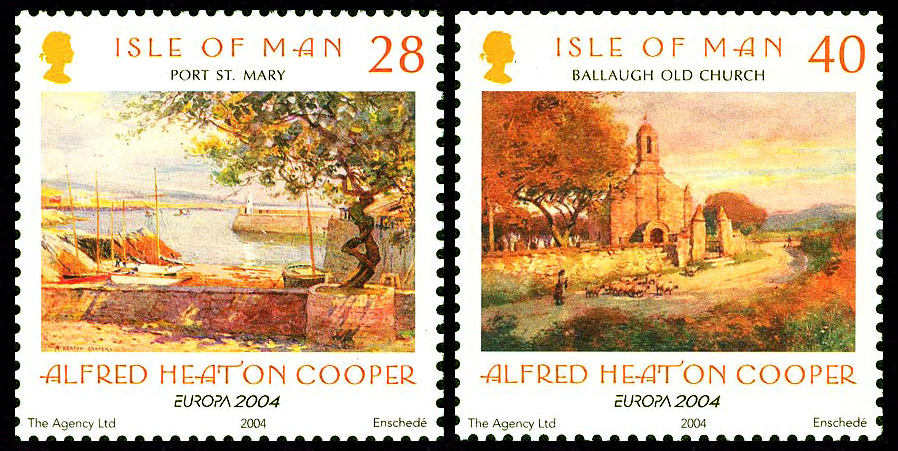
2004 Europa stamps of the Isle of Man

After several years of negotiation, the Isle of Man Post Office Authority was launched on 5 July 1973. Spink and Son Ltd produced the first stamp essays but the Authority preferred to initiate its own designs. The Manx design was inspired by Isle of Man Art Society chairman, Victor Kneale, who had produced 18 designs to show what could be done. His membership of an advisory committee meant exclusion from being the official designer but when self-taught artist John Nicholson was appointed as designer what he produced reflected Kneale's proposals. Subsequently, Kneale would be the first chairman of Isle of Man Post and Nicholson would design the latter's first stamps. One of the most recent releases is the stamp series to commemorate the life and engagement of The Bee Gees Maurice Gibb, CBE. For the first time, an entire series was provided by a single photographer, the legendary music photographer Guido Karp. In December 2024, the Authority published a collection of stamps honoring Sir Mark Cavendish KBE – The Manx Missile. The collection a sheetlet, which is an amalgamation of three previous stamp issues featuring the cyclist, showcases images capturing key moments throughout the years. They include representing the Isle of Man at the Commonwealth Games, being part of Great Britain's Olympic team, and competing in the Tour de France. The collection also features details about his career and famous victories.

== Sources ==
- Gibbons, Stanley (1985). Stamps of the World (15th ed.). London: Stanley Gibbons Publications Ltd. ISBN 0-85259-088-1.
- Gibbons, Stanley (2012). Collect British Stamps (63rd ed.). London: Stanley Gibbons Publications Ltd. ISBN 978-0-85259-822-1.
- Rossiter, Stuart; Flower, John (1989). The Stamp Atlas. London: MacDonald & Co. ISBN 0-356-18043-3.
