= Postage stamps and postal history of Guernsey =

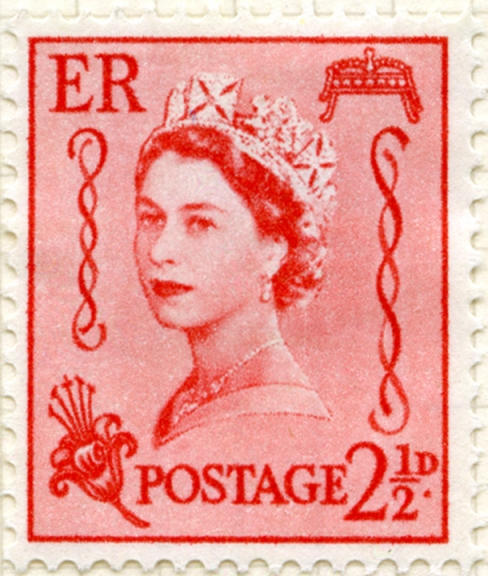
Guernsey 2 1/2d regional issue of 1964; design by Eric Piprel

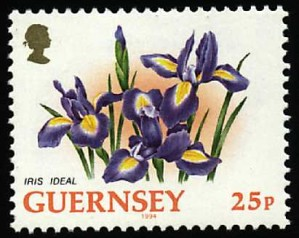
A 1994 stamp of Guernsey

Guernsey’s postal service was established in March 1794, with the first mail from the island sent with captains of packet ships, using agents in the England and in the islands for the end delivery. Before the creation of Guernsey Post in 1969, the island's mail was controlled from the British mainland, by Royal Mail.

== History ==
The first pillar boxes in Britain were introduced in the Channel Islands as an experiment in 1852, to collect mail for the Royal Mail packet boats. In contrast to postboxes on the British mainland, Guernsey’s postboxes are painted blue. However, the first postbox installed at Saint-Peter-Port is the only one never to have been painted, and remains red.

The first postage stamps printed for use in Guernsey were issued during the occupation of the island during World War II.

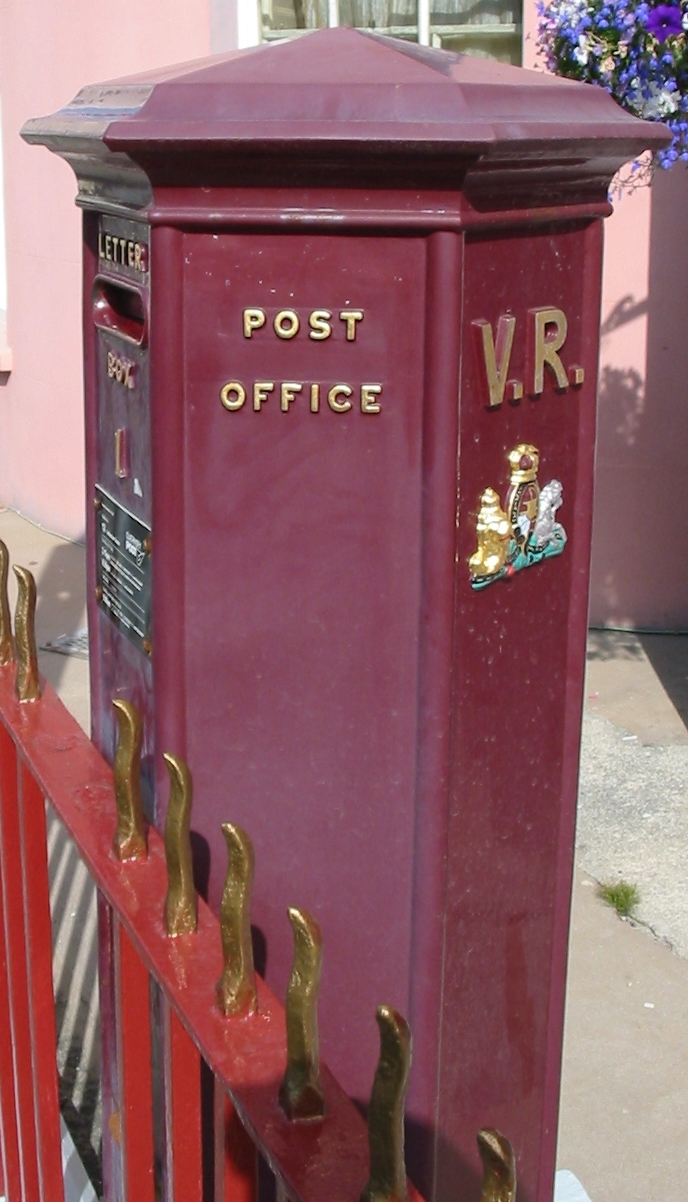
This VR box in Guernsey is the oldest box in use in the British Isles.

In the 1950s Guernsey used British regional stamps marked specifically for use in Guernsey but valid for postage throughout the United Kingdom.

Guernsey has issued its own stamps since the creation of Guernsey Post Office on 1 October 1969. Prior to this date, Guernsey’s postal system was controlled from the mainland.

The Bailiwick of Guernsey incorporates Alderney, Herm and Sark which all used the Guernsey issues from 1969. From 1983 Guernsey began issuing specific stamps designated Alderney for use in that island which are also valid throughout the Bailiwick of Guernsey. From 2025 stamps designated Sark began to be issued.

Since 2015, Guernsey has issued Post & Go stamps.

Guernsey has a small museum dedicated to its postal history, in Saint-Peter-Port.

== See also ==
- List of postage stamps of Guernsey
- List of postage stamps of Alderney
- Revenue stamps of Guernsey
