= Country definitives =

Postage stamps issued for regions of the UK

Country definitives, previously known as regionals, are the postage stamps issued for each of the home nations of the United Kingdom and (until 1969) the Channel Islands and (until 1973) the Isle of Man.

Postage stamps were first issued in May 1840 and were valid throughout the United Kingdom of Great Britain and Ireland until 1922 and in the United Kingdom of Great Britain and Northern Ireland thereafter.

In 1958, specific stamps were issued for Scotland, Wales, Northern Ireland, Guernsey, Jersey, and the Isle of Man. The designs used the same portrait as the Wilding series of stamps, but were specially designed to incorporate the symbols of each of the home nations and Crown dependencies.

Northern Ireland, Scotland, Wales and Isle of Man "regional" stamps were replaced on decimalisation with new designs in the Machin series, having the relevant emblem shown in the top left-hand corner. They were replaced between 1999 and 2000 with new designs for the four home nations.

While generally sold at post offices in their respective areas, all were valid throughout the UK and, until they became postally independent, the Crown Dependencies.

== Post-war proposal ==
The idea of regional stamps came up after World War II to help tourism in the Channel Islands, which had been occupied by German forces until the end of the conflict. The concept was extended to Scotland, Wales and Northern Ireland, and essays were prepared: positions of King George VI's head and symbols.

== 1958 issues ==
Special committees were established to choose the heraldic emblems or symbols for the each country or island. These are discussed in the sections below. The first value (3d deep lilac) of the regional issues were introduced on 18 August 1958 in the Channel Islands, the Isle of Man, Scotland, Wales and Northern Ireland. The design consisted of the Dorothy Wilding's portrait of the Queen surrounded by appropriate regional symbols. Other values were introduced at later dates. Some of the issue dates are unclear, as the stamps were first issued at the Philatelic Bureau in Edinburgh, others first at the Philatelic Counter in London, yet others first in the region.

The colours used were consistent across the various regions, and stayed constant with the exception of the 4d value, which was issued in three different colours – initially ultramarine, then olive-sepia and finally vermilion. The 4d's initial colour change was made to bring it into line with that used by the newly issued pre-decimal Machin series (from 5 June 1967 onwards). The Machin 4d's colour was then changed because of complaints that the date of postmarks (critical for football pool entries) could not be read on so dark a colour. All the regional 4d's were then changed again to the new Machin colour of vermilion.

=== Scotland ===
The Scottish Committee chose designs by John B. Fleming, Gordon F. Huntly and Archie B. Imrie.

Queen Elizabeth II Scotland "Wilding" issue
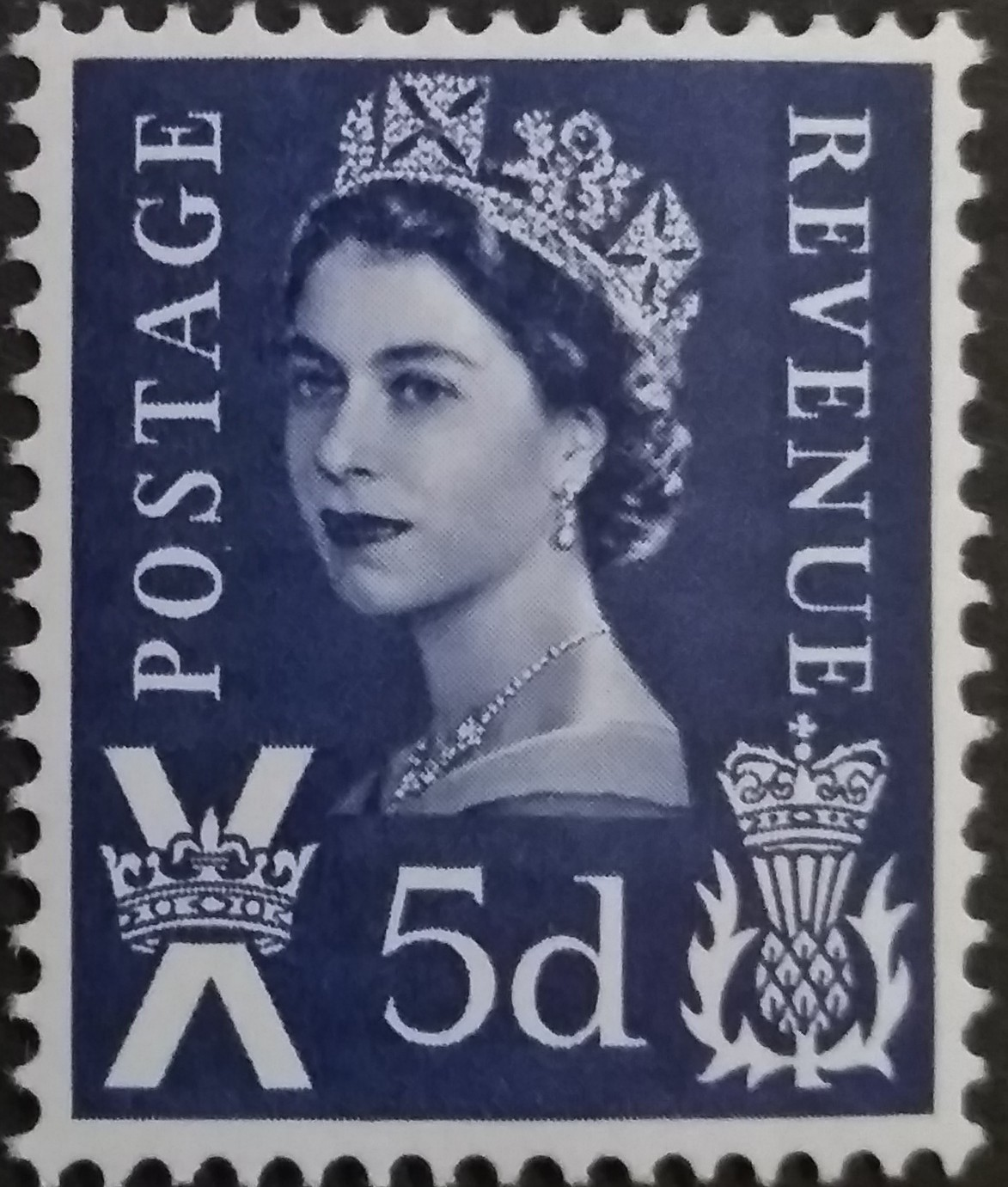
5d denomination (design also used for 3d and 4d)

=== Wales ===
The symbols selected by the Welsh committee were the Welsh Dragon (passant) and the leek. Three designs by Reynolds Stone were chosen.

=== Northern Ireland ===
There were perceived to be some particular problems creating the Northern Ireland definitives because of a lack of symbols that might be used to represent Northern Ireland while avoiding contentious political symbolism. The committee charged with organising the choice of design decided on Dorothy Wilding's portrait of the Queen augmented with symbols: the Red Hand of Ulster (the emblem of the O’Neills – the royal house of Ulster); the Arms of Northern Ireland (without supporters); the six-pointed Crowned Star with the Red Hand; the Flax Plant (with or without leaves); and a Field Gate with Ulster pillars. Several local artists were chosen to present designs and one from each was chosen by the Queen. The artists were: Thomas Collins; Leonard Pilton; William Hollywood; Colin Middleton; Miss T. Robinson. Three, Collins; Pilton and Hollywood were chosen to be issued.

1958 Queen Elizabeth II Northern Ireland "Wilding" issue
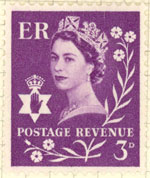
3d denomination (design also used for 4d and 5d issued later)

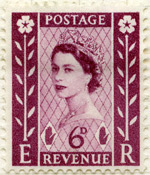
6d denomination (design also used for 9d issued later)

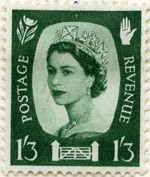
1/3d denomination (design also used for 1/6 issued later)

=== Channel Islands ===
Eric Piprell designed the Guernsey stamps. These show the Crown of William the Conqueror and the Guernsey lily as described in the book The Lilium Sarniense by James Douglas published in 1975. He also designed the 2 1/2d, which showed a variation of the Lily and Crown theme. The Jersey stamps were designed by William Gardner, with the exception of the 2 1/2d issue which was designed by Edmund Blampied. The Gardner design showed the Mace presented to the island by Charles II in 1663 and the Arms of Jersey as the main subjects with a potato and tomato plant in the borders to emphasise the importance of agriculture. The Blampied design also used the Mace and Arms, but in different positions and omitted the plants. Source: Channel Islands Stamps and Postal History, published by Stanley Gibbons in 1979.

Jersey and Guernsey became postally independent on 1 October 1969 when they each issued their own inaugural series.

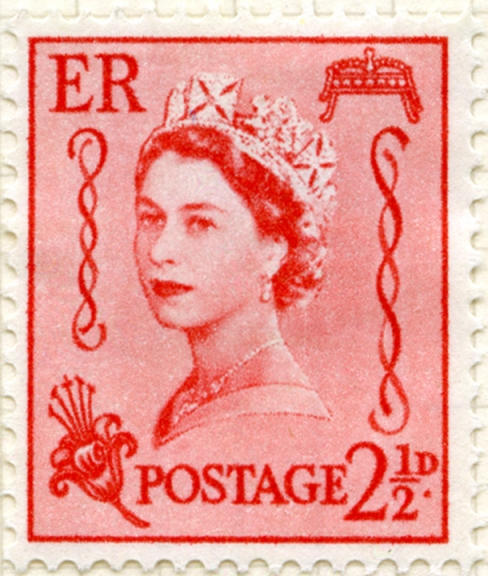
Guernsey 2 1/2d regional issue of 1964; design by Eric Piprel

Jersey 2 1/2d regional issue of 1964; design by Edmund Blampied

=== Isle of Man ===
The Isle of Man stamps, designed by John Nicholson, included the tre cassyn (Three Legs) escutcheoned (on a shield), the three spurs looking rather like stars, and had a bordering ring-chain pattern based on designs on ancient Manx stone crosses.

== Decimal issues ==
Isle of Man 7 1/2p regional issue of 1971

On 7 July 1971 the previous Wilding based designs for the Isle of Man, Scotland, Wales and Northern Ireland were replaced with designs similar to the standard British Machin portrait definitives. Each stamp had a reduced size portrait of Queen Elizabeth II by Arnold Machin with a national emblem in the top left corner, the latter designed by Jeffery Matthews. The emblems used were:

- Isle of Man: The triskelion;
- Northern Ireland: The "Red Hand of Ulster" in a star beneath a crown;
- Scotland: The lion rampant;
- Wales: The Welsh dragon.

The colours of the Machin regionals were the same as those of the main Machin issues. There are a few exceptions, for example the 4½p regionals are a darker blue. Not all the values and colours of the main issue appear in the regionals, but as these designs remained in use in the other regions for the rest of the 20th century, a large number of values were issued.

The Isle of Man became postally autonomous on 5 July 1973 and only four Machin values were therefore ever issued for this region:

- 2 1/2p bright magenta
- 3p ultramarine
- 5p reddish violet
- 7 1/2p chestnut

== Pictorial issues ==
In the late 1990s, new designs were produced for each of the four British home nations including (for the first time ever) England. Four values were issued for each nation, firstly Scotland and Wales on 8 June 1999, Northern Ireland on 6 March 2001 and finally, England on 23 April 2001, each showing heraldic and other symbols of the relevant country. These were initially borderless (full-bleed), but in 2003 these were replaced with stamps having white borders. As postal rates have changed, so have the values denominated on some of the stamps. The '2nd' and '1st' values have remained constant, but the 'E' value reverted to 40p initially, and then increased to 42p, 44p, 48p, 50p and 56p. The 64p and 65p values have been reissued as 68p, 72p, 78p, 81p, 90p and 97p values. As of 2020, the values were £1.42 and £1.63 respectively; the January 2021 change of tariff saw the 'third' stamp increased to £1.70, then on 11 August 2022 it again increased to £1.80, but the 'fourth' stamp remained at its (now lower) price of £1.63.

The original pictorial regional GB definitives

== See also ==
- Jersey Post
- Guernsey Post
- Isle of Man Post Office
- Postage stamps and postal history of Guernsey
- Postage stamps and postal history of Jersey
- Postage stamps and postal history of the Isle of Man
- Wilding series
