= Royal Horticultural Society =

Registered charity in the UK

- Abbreviation: RHS
- Formation: 7 March 1804; 222 years ago (as Horticultural Society of London)
- Type: Registered charity
- Purpose: Promote gardening and horticulture
- Headquarters: London, SW1
- Region served: United Kingdom
- Members: 609,000+ (2024)
- President: Keith Weed
- Budget: 2024/25 income: £124.8m
- Website: rhs.org.uk

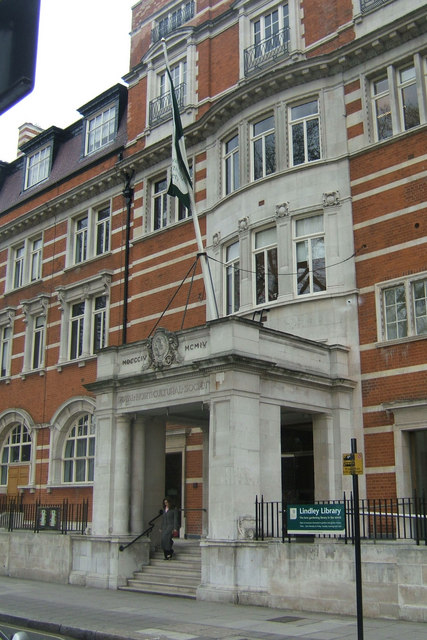
RHS headquarters, Vincent Square

The Royal Horticultural Society (RHS), founded in 1804 as the Horticultural Society of London, is the UK's leading gardening charity.

The RHS promotes horticulture through its five gardens at Wisley (Surrey), Hyde Hall (Essex), Harlow Carr (North Yorkshire), Rosemoor (Devon) and Bridgewater (Greater Manchester); flower shows including the RHS Chelsea Flower Show, RHS Badminton Flower Show and RHS Sandringham Flower Show; community gardening schemes; Britain in Bloom and a vast educational programme. It also supports training for professional and amateur gardeners. As of 2023 the president was Keith Weed and the director general was Clare Matterson CBE.

== History ==
=== Founders ===
The creation of a British horticultural society was suggested by John Wedgwood (son of Josiah Wedgwood) in 1800. His aims were fairly modest: he wanted to hold regular meetings, allowing the society's members the opportunity to present papers on their horticultural activities and discoveries, to encourage discussion of them, and to publish the results. The society would also award prizes for gardening achievements.

Wedgwood discussed the idea with his friends, but it was four years before the first meeting, of seven men, took place, on 7 March 1804 at Hatchards bookshop in Piccadilly, London. Wedgwood was chairman; also present were William Townsend Aiton (successor to his father, William Aiton, as Superintendent of Kew Gardens), Sir Joseph Banks (President of the Royal Society), James Dickson (a nurseryman), William Forsyth (Superintendent of the gardens of St. James's Palace and Kensington Palace), Charles Francis Greville (a Lord of the Admiralty) and Richard Anthony Salisbury, who became the Secretary of the new society.

Banks proposed his friend Thomas Andrew Knight for membership. The proposal was accepted, despite Knight's ongoing feud with Forsyth over a plaster for healing tree wounds which Forsyth was developing. Knight was president of the society from 1811 to 1838, and developed the society's aims and objectives to include a programme of practical research into fruit-breeding.

== Membership ==
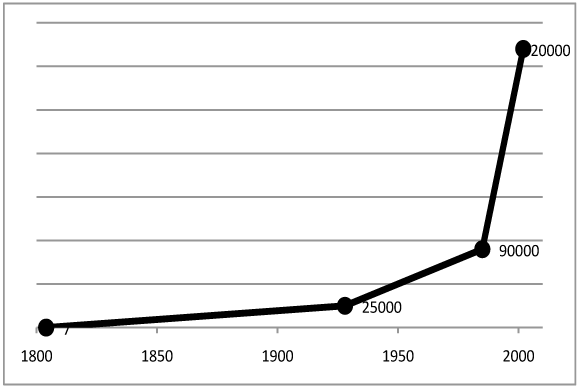
Members of the RHS from its founding until 2002

In 2009 more than 363,000 people were members of the society, and the number increased to more than 414,000 in 2013 and to 525,105 by 2019. Membership and fellowship of the society were previously decided by election, but are now by financial contribution. Fellows are supporters "contributing a suggested £5,000 per annum" (as of 2022).

Members and Fellows of the Royal Horticultural Society are entitled to use the post-nominal letters MRHS and FRHS, respectively.

Membership by financial year
| Financial year | Number of members |
|---|---|
| 2013/14 | 414,699 |
| 2014/15 | 428,472 |
| 2015/16 | 448,977 |
| 2016/17 | 472,157 |
| 2017/18 | 490,205 |
| 2018/19 | 502,666 |
| 2019/20 | 525,105 |
| 2020/21 | 521,132 |
| 2021/22 | 603,458 |
| 2022/23 | 625,000≈ |
| 2023/24 | 626,000≈ |
| 2024/25 | 609,000≈ |

== Gardens ==
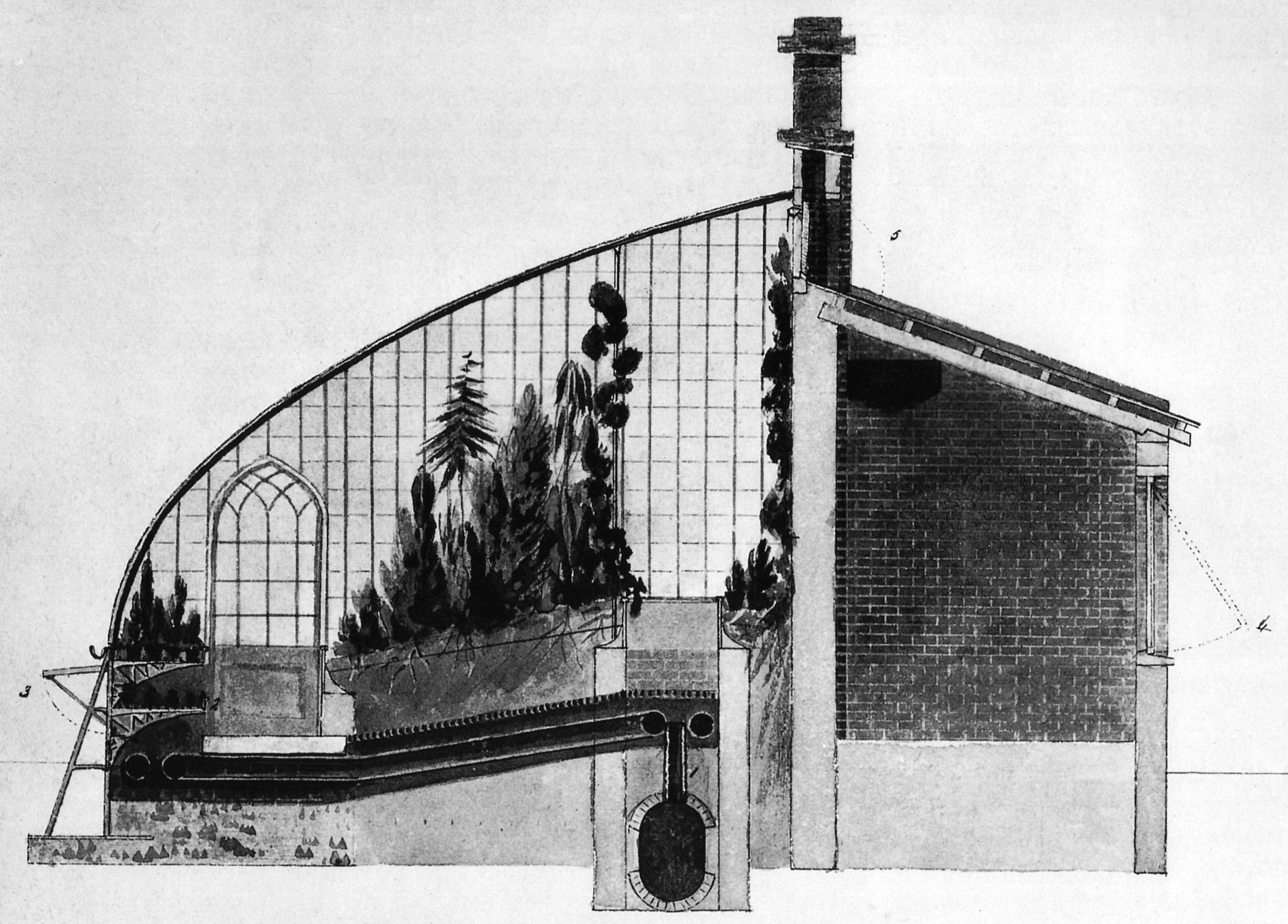
Greenhouse design for Royal Horticultural Society by John Claudius Loudon, 1818

The Royal Horticultural Society's five major gardens in England are: Wisley Garden, near Wisley in Surrey; Rosemoor Garden in Devon; Hyde Hall in Essex; Harlow Carr in Harrogate, North Yorkshire and RHS Garden Bridgewater in Worsley, Greater Manchester.

The society's first garden was in Kensington, from 1818 to 1822. In 1820 the society leased some of Hugh Ronalds' nursery ground at Little Ealing to set up an experimental garden, but the next year part of the Duke of Devonshire's estate at Chiswick was obtained. In 1823 it employed Joseph Paxton there. From 1827 the society held fêtes at the Chiswick garden, and from 1833, shows with competitive classes for flowers and vegetables. In 1861 the RHS (as it had now become) developed a new garden at South Kensington on land leased from the Royal Commission for the Exhibition of 1851 (the Science Museum, Imperial College and the Royal College of Music now occupy the site), but it was closed in 1882. The Chiswick garden was maintained until 1903–1904, by which time Sir Thomas Hanbury had bought the garden at Wisley and presented it to the RHS.

RHS Garden Wisley is thus the society's oldest garden. Rosemoor came next, presented by Lady Anne Berry in 1988. Hyde Hall was given to the RHS in 1993 by its owners Dick and Helen Robinson. Dick Robinson was also the owner of the Harry Smith Collection which was based at Hyde Hall. Then came Harlow Carr, acquired by the merger of the Northern Horticultural Society with the RHS in 2001. It had been the Northern Horticultural Society's trial ground and display garden since they bought it in 1949. In 2013, more than 1.63 million people visited the four gardens.

In 2015 the RHS announced plans for a fifth garden at Worsley New Hall, Greater Manchester, under the name RHS Garden Bridgewater. The garden opened in May 2021.

The society also operates a partner garden scheme which enables its members to visit other operator's gardens. As of January 2026 there are 241 partner gardens, including 13 UK gardens and 5 overseas gardens which were added to the scheme that month.

== Shows ==
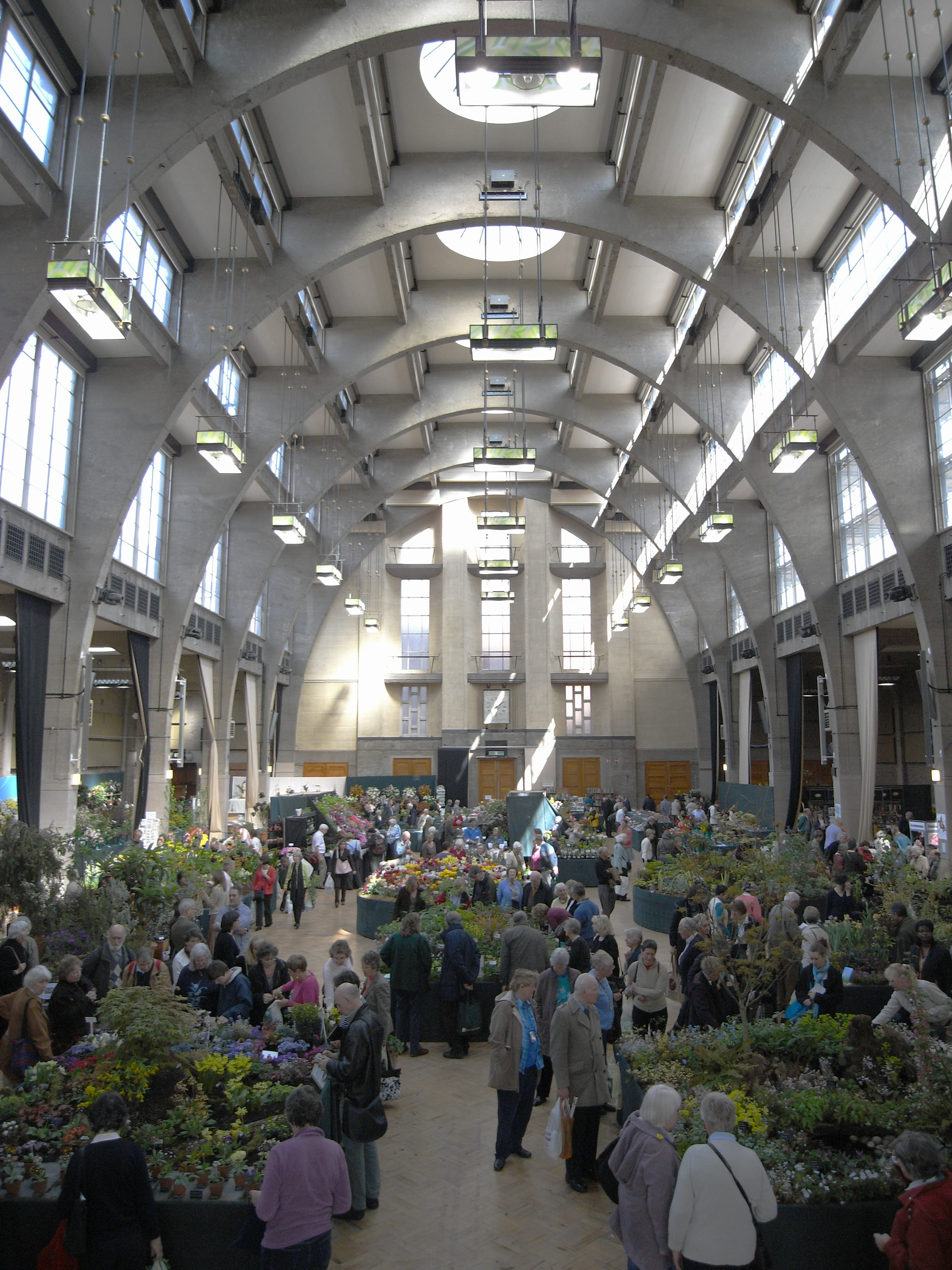
London flower show in Lawrence Hall

The RHS is well known for its annual flower shows which take place across the UK. The most famous of these shows is the RHS Chelsea Flower Show, visited by people from across the world. This was followed by the Hampton Court Palace Flower Show (which the RHS took over in 1993) and RHS Tatton Park Flower Show in Cheshire (since 1999). In 2024 the line up expanded to include the Malvern Spring Festival, Garden Hyde Hall Flower Show, Garden Rosemoor Flower Show and the first RHS Urban Show. In 2025 they introduced the first RHS Flower show at Wentworth Woodhouse.

The society is also closely involved with BBC Gardeners' World Live held annually at the Birmingham National Exhibition Centre.

The RHS's Sandringham Flower Show was a new show held in the grounds of Sandringham House during July 2026.

== Libraries ==
The RHS is custodian of the Lindley Library, housed within its headquarters at 80 Vincent Square, London, and in branches at each of its four gardens. The library is based upon the book collection of John Lindley.

The RHS Herbarium has its own image library (collection) consisting of more than 3,300 original watercolours, approximately 30,000 colour slides and a rapidly increasing number of digital images. Although most of the images have been supplied by photographers commissioned by the RHS, the archive includes a substantial number of slides from the Harry Smith Collection and Plant Heritage National Plant Collection holders.

The libraries in each of the gardens are open to all visitors. RHS members can borrow books from the Lindley London, as well as the libraries at Wisley Garden and Harlow Carr Garden.

== Britain in Bloom ==
In 2002, the RHS took over the administration of the Britain in Bloom competition from the Tidy Britain Group (formerly and subsequently Keep Britain Tidy). In 2010, the society launched 'It's your neighbourhood', a campaign to encourage people to get involved in horticulture for the benefit of their community. In 2014, 'Britain in Bloom' celebrated its 50th anniversary.

== Education and training ==
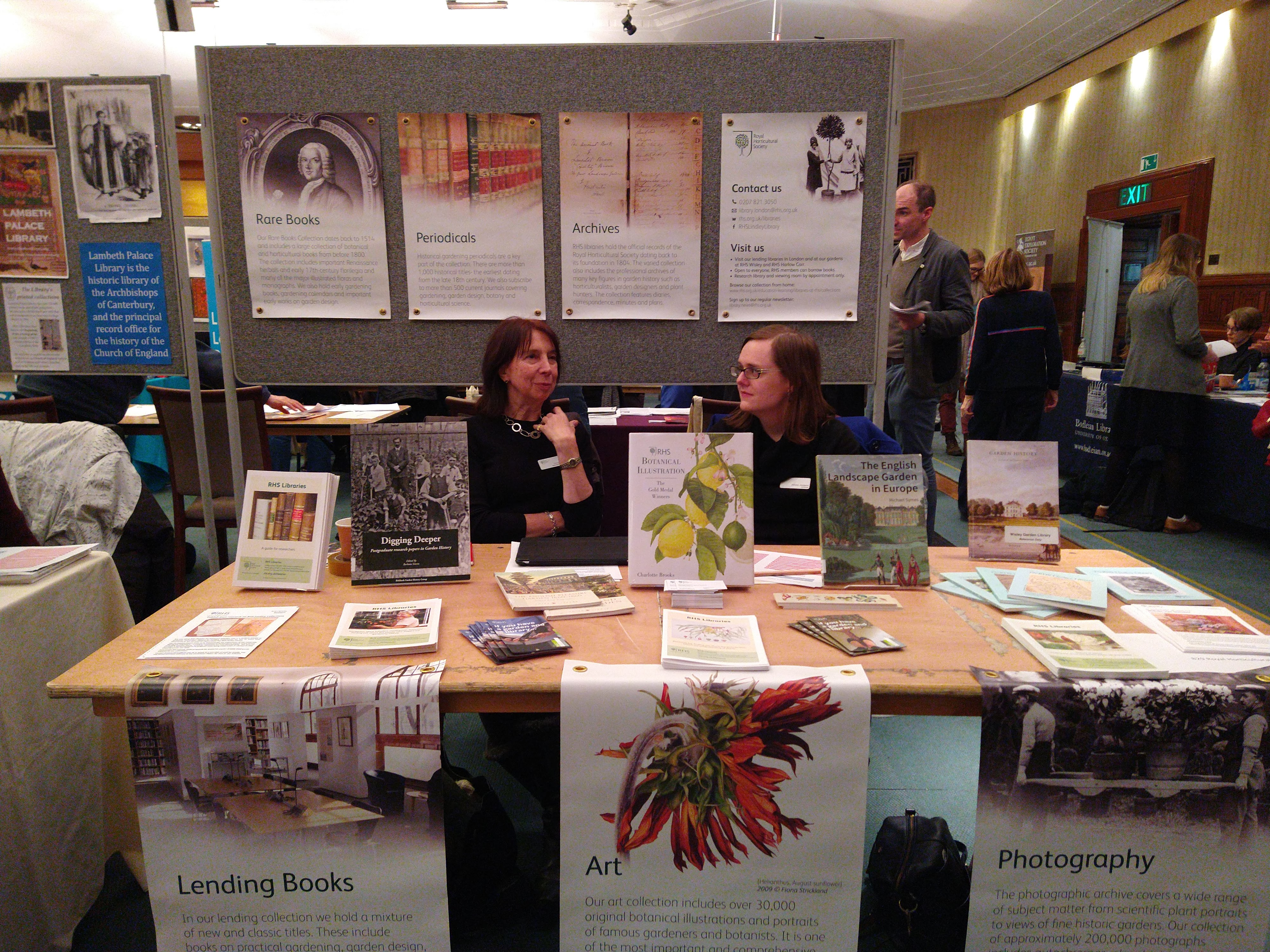
Royal Horticultural Society Libraries at the Senate House History Day, 2019

The RHS runs formal courses for professional and amateur gardeners and horticulturalists and also validates qualifications gained elsewhere (e.g. at Kew Botanic Gardens).

The RHS Level 1 Award in Practical Horticulture aims to develop essential horticultural skills and to provide a foundation for further RHS practical qualifications at Levels 2 and 3. It is aimed at anyone who has an interest in plants and gardening.

Level 2 qualifications provide a basis for entry into professional horticulture, support career development for existing horticultural workers or can provide a foundation for further learning or training. There are separate theoretical- and practical-based qualifications at this Level and the RHS Level 2 Diploma in the Principles and Practices of Horticulture combines the theoretical- and practical-based qualifications.

Level 3 qualifications allow specialisation in the candidate's area of interest. They can offer proficiency for those looking for employment in horticulture, they can support further career and professional development for those already working in the field, or they can provide a basis for continued learning or training. As for Level 2, there are theoretical- and practical-based qualifications at Level 3 and a Diploma that combines both.

The Master of Horticulture (RHS) Award is the society's most prestigious professional horticultural qualification. It is of degree level and it is intended for horticultural professionals. The course allows for flexible study over a period of three years or more.

The RHS Campaign for School Gardening provides online inspiration, resources and advice to its members. With the help of teachers, volunteers and other school-gardening champions, they support millions of students in the UK, giving them the opportunity to grow plants, food and develop life skills.

== Medals and awards ==
=== People ===
The society honours certain British persons who are deemed by its council to be deserving of special recognition in the field of horticulture with the Victoria Medal of Honour, established in 1897. There are only 63 holders of this medal at any time, one for every year of the reign of Queen Victoria. Since 2023, the society has handed out the Elizabeth Medal of Honour, for which there could be only 70 holders at any time, one for every year of the reign of Queen Elizabeth II. Thus, neither of the aforementioned medals are awarded every year

Other awards bestowed by the society include the Associate of Honour (established in 1930) where the number does not exceed 100 at any time (unless they also hold the Victoria Medal of Honour). As of 2022 there were also the Harlow Carr Medal (for significant contribution to horticulture in the north of England), Reginald Cory Memorial Cup (for introducing new hybrid plants developed from existing garden plants), Community Award (for long-term contribution to community gardening) and the Roy Lancaster Award (for exceptional contribution by those under 35 years old). Medals issued by the society earlier in its history have included the Banksian, Knightian and Lindley medals, named after early officers of the society, as well as Honorary Fellowships.

The Veitch Memorial Medal, named after James Veitch, is awarded annually to persons of any nationality who have made an outstanding contribution to the advancement and improvement of the science and practice of horticulture.

The society awards Gold, Silver-gilt, Silver and Bronze medals to exhibitors at its Flower Shows.

=== Plants ===
The Award of Garden Merit, or AGM, is the principal award made to garden plants by the society after a period of assessment by the appropriate committees of the society. Awards are made annually after plant trials.

Older books may contain references to the following awards, which were based mainly on flower or fruit quality (but which are not referred to in current (2014) RHS websites and reports):

PC: Preliminary Certificate
HC: Highly Commended
AM: Award of Merit (not the same as the AGM)
FCC: First Class Certificate (once a very prestigious award)

== Publications ==
=== Journals ===
The society published its proceedings as the Transactions of the Horticultural Society of London from 1807 to 1848. The society has also published a journal since 1846. It was initially known as the Journal of the Horticultural Society of London (1846–1855), then Proceedings of the Horticultural Society of London (1859–1860) and then Proceedings of the Royal Horticultural Society (1861–1869).

Its main periodical for members was continued as the Journal of the Royal Horticultural Society (1866–1975). Since 1975 this monthly publication has been entitled The Garden. The RHS also publishes The Plant Review four times a year and The Orchid Review annually, and it published Hanburyana, an annual publication dedicated to horticultural taxonomy, from 2006 to 2013.

=== Registers and encyclopedias ===
Since the establishment of International Registration Authorities for plants in 1955 the RHS has acted as Registrar for certain groups of cultivated plants. It is now Registrar for nine categories – conifers, clematis, daffodils, dahlias, delphiniums, dianthus, lilies, orchids and rhododendrons. It publishes The International Orchid Register, an extensive listing of orchid hybrids, and the Encyclopedia of Conifers, which was published in 2012.

=== Books ===
The RHS publishes many horticulture and gardening books, including:

- Ingram, David S.; Vince-Prue, Daphne; Gregory, Peter J., eds. (2008). Science and the garden the scientific basis of horticultural practice (2nd ed.). Oxford: Blackwell. ISBN 9781444360356.
- Huxley, Anthony; Griffiths, Mark; Levy, Margot (1992) [1st ed. Frederick Chittenden and William Stearn. Oxford University Press 1951. 2nd ed. P.M. Synge (ed.) Oxford 1956]. The New Royal Horticultural Society Dictionary of Gardening (4 vols.). London: Macmillan. ISBN 978-0333474945.

== Presidents ==
Horticultural Society of London (1804–1861)

- 1811–1838 : Thomas Andrew Knight (1st President)
- 1838–1858 : William Cavendish, 6th Duke of Devonshire
- 1858–1861 : Albert, Prince Consort

Royal Horticultural Society (1861–)

- 1862–1883 : Duke of Buccleuch
- 1884–1885 : Sir Benjamin Thomas Brandreth-Gibbs
- 1885–1913 : Sir Trevor Lawrence
- 1913–1919 : Francis Grenfell, 1st Baron Grenfell
- 1919–1928 : Amelius Lockwood, 1st Baron Lambourne
- 1928–1931 : Gerald Loder, 1st Baron Wakehurst (11th President)
- 1931–1953 : Henry McLaren, 2nd Baron Aberconway
- 1953–1961 : Sir David Bowes-Lyon
- 1961–1984 : Charles McLaren, 3rd Baron Aberconway
- 1984–1994 : Robin A.E. Herbert
- 1994–2001 : Sir Simon Hornby
- 2001–2006 : Sir Richard Carew-Pole, Bt
- 2006–2008 : Peter N. Buckley
- 2009–2010 : Giles Coode-Adams
- 2010–2013 : Elizabeth Banks
- 2013–2020 : Sir Nicholas Bacon, Bt
- 2020–present : Keith Weed

== See also ==
- Royal Horticultural Society of Ireland
- Arlow Stout, a pioneer in the hybridization of daylilies, honorary life fellow of RHS
- Lindley Hall, exhibition hall owned by the RHS and located next to their head office in London
- Robert Allen Rolfe, the founder of the magazine The Orchid Review

== Bibliography ==
- Elliott, Brent (2004). The Royal Horticultural Society: A History 1804–2004. Phillimore.
- Fletcher, Harold R. (1969). The Story of the Royal Horticultural Society 1804–1968. Oxford University Press.
- "Royal Horticultural Society". Scholarly Societies Project. University of Waterloo. Archived from the original on 16 July 2015.
