= Unstereotype Alliance =

Coalition of companies

Unstereotype Alliance is a coalition of companies in the advertising industry that focuses on reducing stereotypes in advertisements and enhancing gender equality in advertisement staff. It has national chapters in Brazil, Japan, South Africa, Turkey, the United Arab Emirates and the United Kingdom.

Unstereotype Alliance was founded in June 2017, led by UN Women and Unilever with other multinational companies. Its initial sponsors included P&G, AT&T, Johnson & Johnson and Unilever. It was preceded by the "#Unstereotype" campaign started by Unilever.

== Activities ==
Unstereotype Alliance provides guidelines and tools to avoid gender stereotypes in advertisements. It released its first report "Beyond Gender 2: The Impact of Intersectionality in Advertising" in October 2021.
