= Postage stamps and postal history of Jersey =

A Jersey 2 1/2d regional issue of 1964, design by Edmund Blampied

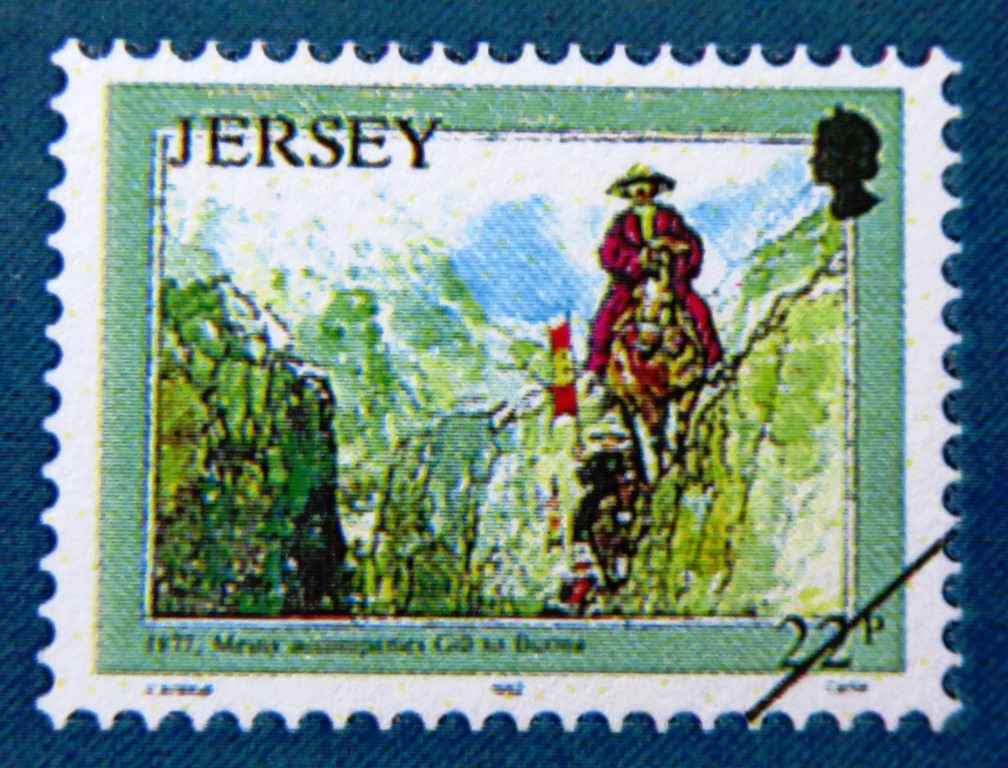
A 1999 stamp of Jersey

The first postage stamps marked Jersey were issued during the occupation of the island by the Germans during World War II.

Later, Jersey used British regional stamps marked specifically for use in Jersey but valid for postage throughout the United Kingdom.

Jersey has issued its own stamps since 1 October 1969.

Since 2014, Jersey has also issued Post & Go stamps.

== See also ==
- Revenue stamps of Jersey
