= Timeline of strikes in 2018 =

Strikes in 2018

A number of labour strikes, labour disputes, and other industrial actions occurred in 2018.

== Background ==
A labor strike is a work stoppage, caused by the mass refusal of employees to work, usually in response to employee grievances, such as low pay or poor working conditions. Strikes can also take place to demonstrate solidarity with workers in other workplaces or to pressure governments to change policies.

== Timeline ==
=== Continuing strikes from 2017 ===
- Spectrum strike
- 2017–2019 transport strikes in the Philippines
- 2016–2019 United Kingdom railway strikes
- VCUarts adjunct workers' protests
- 2007–08 Writers Guild of America strike

=== January ===
- 2018 German metalworkers strike, organised by IG Metall, calling for improved work-life balance.
- 2018 Peruvian agrarian strike
- 2018–2023 United Kingdom higher education strikes

=== February ===
- 2018 Cargill strike
- 2018–2019 education workers' strikes in the United States
- 2018 Eugen Systems strike
- 2018 West Virginia teachers' strike

=== March ===
- Barcelona Museum workers strike
- 2018 Carleton University strike, by administrative workers at Carleton University in Canada, represented by the Canadian Union of Public Employees, over pensions.
- 2018 Carrefour strike
- International Women's Strike
- 2018 Taylorsville Georgia-Pacific strike
- 2018 York University strike, 143-day long strike by contract professors, teaching assistants, and graduate assistants at York University in Canada, breaking the record for longest post-secondary education strike in Canadian history

=== April ===
- 2018 Arizona teachers' strike
- 2018 Colorado teachers' strike
- 2018 DeKalb County School District bus drivers' strike
- 2018–2019 Iranian general strikes and protests
- 2018 Kane County probation officers' strike, strike by probation officers and youth counselors in Kane County, Illinois.
- 2018 Nicaraguan protests
- 2018 Oklahoma teachers' strike
- 2018 Zimbabwe nurses' strike

=== May ===
- 2018 Brazil truck drivers' strike
- 2018 CP Rail strike, 1-day strike.
- 2018 Indian banking strikes
- 2018 North Carolina teachers' walkout

=== July ===
- Jasic incident
- 2018 Israeli LGBT strike

=== August ===
- 2018 Alabama Coca-Cola strike
- 2018 Alcoa strike, by Alcoa workers in Australia, the first in 8 years.
- 2018 Atlanta sanitation strike
- 2018 Conrad Bora Bora strike, by Conrad Hotels workers in Bora Bora, represented by the O Oe To Oe Rima union.
- 2018 Eiffel Tower strike, in protest against a new visitor access policy.
- 2018 Ryanair strike
- School strike for climate
- 2018 U.S. prison strike

=== September ===
- 2018 Costa Rican protests

=== October ===
- 2018 Canada Post strikes
- 2018 Marriott Hotels strike
- 2018 South Korean taxi drivers strikes, by taxi drivers in South Korea in protest against a new ridesharing app developed by Kakao.
- 2018-19 Sumifru strike, by Sumitomo Fruit Corporation plantation workers in the Philippines.

=== November ===
- 2018 Nigerian university strike, organised by the Academic Staff Union of Universities.
- 2018 Port of Setúbal strike, by dock workers in Setúbal, Portugal.
- 2018-19 Sibanye-Stillwater strike, by Sibanye-Stillwater miners in South Africa.

=== December ===
- 2018–2019 Bangladesh protests
- 2018 Beefeaters' strike, 3-hour strike by Beefeaters in London, England, over pensions, the first strike by Beefeaters in 55 years.
- 2018 Newsquest Cumbria strike, by Newsquest local journalists in Cumbria, England, represented by the National Union of Journalists, in protest against redundancies and a lack of a pay raise in three years.
- 2018 Tahiti Valeurs strike, by workers of the ATM supplier Tahiti Valeurs, represented by the A Tia I Mua union.
- 2018 ZamPost strike, by ZamPost workers.

== Commentary ==
Emma Sara Hughes of Bangor University and Tony Dundon of the University of Manchester stated that although the total number of strikes in the United Kingdom continued to fall, continuing the last few decades, there were changes to the patterns of strikes in 2018. Notably an increase in the number of strikes at private companies and strikes in companies were workers didn't have official union representation.

The Bureau of Labor Statistics found that there were 20 major work stoppages in the United States in 2018, the highest since 2007, and that 485,000 workers were involved in work stoppages across the country, the highest since 1986. In Aotearoa New Zealand, at least 70,000 workers were involved in strikes in 2018, the highest since the late 1980s.
