= 2018 North Carolina teachers' walkout =

Rally and protest in North Carolina in 2018

2018 North Carolina teachers' rally
- Part of the 2018–19 education workers' strikes in the United States
- Date: May 16, 2018
- Location: Raleigh, North Carolina
- Caused by: Low salaries; Deflating wages; Suspension of health benefits for future hirees
- Goals: Salary increase; Restore of funding to pre-2008 levels; Reinstatement of healthcare benefits for future hirees; Construction board to overlook school repairs
- Methods: Occupation; Demonstrations; Internet activism; Walkout

Parties
DSA; IWW; May 16 Coalition; NCAE	Government of North Carolina; NCGOP; NCDP

Lead figures
Oliver A. Holley; Shammah Barrett; Tiffany Smith	Roy Cooper; Harry Brown; Tim Moore

Number
123,000 workers idled	

The 2018 North Carolina teachers' rally was a rally and protest on May 16, 2018, with teachers in North Carolina walking out in protest of deflating wages and decreased employee benefits.

The rally is part of the larger wave of teachers' strikes in the United States where protests occurred in West Virginia, Oklahoma, Colorado, and Arizona.

== Background ==
=== State of education in North Carolina ===
Ahead of the protests the average salary for a teacher in North Carolina was $49,970, which ranked 44th in the nation according to a report by the National Education Association. Public school revenue per student in North Carolina ranked 43rd in the nation at $9,675.

=== Demands ===
The North Carolina Association of Educators (NCAE) demanded that the Government of North Carolina enacted legislation that increase per pupil spending, a multi-year pay plan for teachers, support staff, administrators, and all school personnel, which includes the restoration of compensation for longevity and advanced degrees. Additionally, the NCAE demanded that public schools in North Carolina increase the number of school nurses, counselors, social workers and other support personnel and expand Medicaid to improve community health. NCAE also demanded that the state legislature set up a statewide school construction board to fix older schools and reduce large class sizes.

== Response ==
=== Government of North Carolina ===
Roy Cooper, a Democrat, and the Governor of North Carolina, urged local and state officials to stop attacking teachers and unite together to support teachers and schools in the state. Cooper tweeted an editorial of The Charlotte Observer.

Members from the North Carolina Republican Party sent out mass emails to constituents across the state explaining their support for public education and teachers. Joseph Kyzer, a spokesperson for House speaker Tim Moore stated that Republican leadership has continuously raised teachers salaries and that it was Democratic leadership in the state that stalled out spending. Teachers pointed out although salaries have increased, the increases have been modest and lagged far behind the national average, and that despite this, general education funding on supplies and per pupil spending have been continuously cut.

A fellow Republican member, Mark Brody, who serves on the board of Union Day School in Waxhaw, N.C., called teachers protesting and the backers of the protest 'Union Thugs', that want to control the education process. Brody said he was speaking up because he did not want his local Union County schools or North Carolina schools in general to turn into Chicago. "Let the Union thugs get their way now and we are half way there," he said. Brody would defend his statement, but emphasize that the "thug" remark was about trade unions, and not the teachers themselves.

=== Labor unions ===
The Raleigh-Durham chapter of the Industrial Workers of the World helped coordinate transportation for protestors who wished to rally with the teachers in Raleigh.

=== Political organizations ===
Several North Carolina chapters of the Democratic Socialists of America stood in solidarity with the NCAE, and offered coordination for individuals wishing to join the protest.
