= 2018 DeKalb County School District bus drivers' strike =

Labor dispute in Georgia, United States

- Date: April 19, 2018 – April 23, 2018
- Location: DeKalb County, Georgia
- Caused by: Poor pay; Little or not employee benefits
- Goals: Salary increase; Guaranteed leave and healthcare
- Methods: Sick-out
- Status: Coalition and DCSD in negotiations
- Result: Termination of seven DCSD bus drivers

Parties
DeKalb County School Bus Driver Solidarity Coalition; General Defense Committee Atlanta Chapter; Industrial Workers of the World Atlanta chapter	DeKalb County School District administration

Lead figures
Melanie Douglas; Heather Sabel-Sowers	R. Stephen Green; Eileen Houston-Stewart

Number
900 bus drivers 382 participants	

The 2018 DeKalb County School District bus drivers' strike was a strike held on April 19, 2018, by nearly 400 school bus drivers in DeKalb County, Georgia, United States. Inspired in part by the nationwide teacher strikes in Republican-dominated states such as West Virginia, Oklahoma and Arizona, bus drivers for DeKalb County School District planned a "sick-out" to protest low wages and little employee benefits.

About 42 percent of bus drivers in the county participated, causing nearly 60-90 minute delays in students being picked up for school. As a right-to-work state, public sector employees are prohibited in Georgia from striking. The strike resulted in at least 7 bus drivers, particularly ones who helped organize the strike, being terminated of employment.

== Background ==
The planned sick-out was in response to ongoing pay cuts and lowered benefits for school bus drivers. Per the website, Indeed, the average school bus driver salary in DeKalb County was $23,000, and the starting pay was around $18,000 to $19,000 per year, which is 23% below the national average.

A day prior to the sick-out R. Stephen Green, the superintendent for DeKalb County School District met with over 300 bus drivers about concerns over pay and benefits. Green said he was committed to improving the pay and working conditions for bus drivers, but did not propose anything further.

The sickout was originally planned for April 19–23, the strike was organized by several bus drivers that went under the labor group name, "DeKalb County School Bus Driver Solidarity Coalition". On April 19, about 380 bus drivers participated of the 908 total, causing nearly 60-90 minute delays for the pickup of students. On April 20, that number decreased to 225. The following Monday, the number further decreased to 63.

== Response ==
=== DeKalb County School District administration ===
R. Stephen Green, the superintendent for DeKalb County School District condemned the strike. Green said "We have been clear from the beginning. We will keep an open dialogue with employees provided they work collaboratively and keep our children safe by reporting to work. Unfortunately, some employees chose another route, and that carries serious consequences." On April 20, seven DCSD bus drivers, that were involved in leading the strike, were terminated of employment.

Green claimed the bus drivers in DeKalb County were among the highest paid in the Atlanta metropolitan area. This included pay raises in 2014 and 2015 in the response of longer work days, that drivers receive benefits despite being part-time, and that the county provides a Transportation Leadership Academy to offer career advancement for bus drivers.

Threats of a second strike seemed possible as the Coalition demanded the fired employees be granted their employment back. On April 26, Green said he would host a meeting with the DeKalb County School Bus Driver Solidarity Coalition to discuss a plan to improve pay and working conditions for bus drivers. Leaders of the Coalition said that Green did not invite the leaders of the Coalition and hand-picked bus drivers to shift the dialogue in his favor.

=== DeKalb County School District parents and students ===
On May 2, 2018, a change.org petition formed from the parents of DCSD urging Green to reinstate the terminated drivers.

== See also ==
- 2018 teachers' strikes in the United States
