= 1990 West Virginia teachers' strike =

1990 strike action

- Part of teacher strikes in the United States
- Date: March 7–18, 1990 (1 week and 4 days)
- Location: West Virginia, United States
- Goals: Increased pay for public school teachers
- Methods: Picketing; Strike action
- Result: $5,000 pay increase over the next three years; Increased funding for employee benefits; Establishment of faculty senates

Parties
West Virginia Education Association; West Virginia Federation of Teachers	Government of West Virginia

Lead figures
President Kayetta Meadows (WVEA); President Barbara Christain (WVFT); President Bob Brown (WVFT)	Governor Gaston Caperton

In March 1990, several thousand public school teachers in the U.S. state of West Virginia went on strike due to disagreements with the state government over pay. The labor dispute, which was the first statewide teachers' strike in West Virginia's history, involved the state affiliates for both the American Federation of Teachers and the National Education Association and lasted eleven days. It ended with an agreement from state legislators to recommend a special session to discuss education matters. Following this, the state government authorized a $5,000 pay increase, as well as increased funding for employee benefits and the establishment of faculty senates in schools.

In 1990, West Virginia had one of the lowest average salaries for public school teachers of any state in the country. In January of that year, Governor Gaston Caperton proposed a hiring freeze and a delay in the implementation of pay increases. The announcement drew condemnation from the unions and from sympathetic legislators, and following protests at the capitol, negotiations commenced between organized labor representatives and the governor. However, by early March, the negotiations had broken down, prompting a strike to commence on March 7.

The strike occurred on a county-by-county basis, with teachers voting in each area to strike. In total, 47 of the state's 55 counties were affected. Major protesting took place at the capitol, which attracted several thousand teachers. Negotiations occurred between the unions and the governor, but disagreements over the terms of a settlement prevented a deal from being reached. Within several days, the state's attorney general had declared the strike illegal and the supreme court ruled that judges could issue injunctions forcing teachers to return to work. On March 12, teachers voted to return to work. This followed a tentative agreement between union leaders and legislative leaders, who promised to request a special session. This eventually led to pay increases for the teachers, implemented over the next three years. The strike would be the last statewide labor dispute concerning teachers in the state until a 2018 strike.

== Background ==
=== Teachers' pay in West Virginia ===
Eight years ago, we ranked 33rd in the nation in pay. We're falling farther and farther behind, not even keeping up with inflation. Our paychecks today have $250 less in spending power than they did ten years ago.

— WVEA President Kayetta Meadows, discussing the state of public school teachers' pay in West Virginia in 1990

According to the Charleston Gazette-Mail, beginning in 1970, the pay for public school teachers in West Virginia began to significantly decline relative to the pay in other states, and by 1990, the average salary in West Virginia was among the lowest in the United States. At the beginning of the year, teachers were making an average of $21,904 (equivalent to $53,979 in 2025), which ranked 49th out of the nation's 50 states. (Note: Several sources state that West Virginia was ranked 49th out of U.S. states for public school teachers' pay in 1990. However, some sources instead say that the state ranked 48th at the time.) By comparison, the national average at the time was over $26,000 ($64,073 in 2025).

At the time, about 16,000 of the state's 22,000 teachers were represented by the West Virginia Education Association (WVEA), a labor union headed by President Kayetta Meadows. Additionally, 3,000 teachers were represented by the West Virginia Federation of Teachers (WVFT), which was led by Presidents Barbara Christain and Bob Brown. These two unions were state affiliates of national unions, the National Education Association (NEA) and the American Federation of Teachers (AFT), respectively.

=== Governorship of Gaston Caperton ===
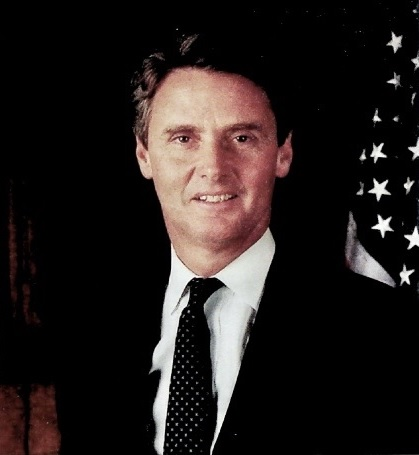
The WVEA supported the successful campaign of Gaston Caperton (pictured 1989) in the 1988 West Virginia gubernatorial election.

In the 1988 West Virginia gubernatorial election, the WVEA became the first major organization to support the successful campaign of Gaston Caperton, who ran in part on a platform of supporting education. In 1989, Caperton reneged on an election promise to not raise taxes when he announced his support for $200 million ($519 million in 2025) in tax increases that would go towards education, supporting teachers' salaries, health benefits, and retirement. That same year, in response to a drop in student enrollment contributed partially to outmigration from the state, the government of West Virginia offered incentives for teachers to engage in an early retirement plan to decrease the total number of public school teachers in the state. This policy resulted in savings for the state government of about $32 million ($83 million in 2025), which was absorbed into the state's budget. In early 1990, public school teachers in the state received a five percent pay increase, which had been the first pay increase for the teachers in three years.

On January 10, 1990, Governor Caperton announced in a State of the State address that, as a result of "static revenues" and a goal of ensuring a balanced budget, he would be advising the state government to impose a hiring freeze and delay the implementation of pay raises for public school teachers. These proposals were to be part of the 1991 fiscal year. At the time, the state spent roughly 70 percent of its annual budget—which in 1990 totaled to $1.7 billion ($4.2 billion in 2025)—on education, which included both primary school and higher.

The following day, a group of 17 members of the state's House of Delegates and Senate participated in a press conference where they criticized the governor's proposed budget. During the event, Senator Sondra Moore Lucht, the chair of the Senate's Education Committee, said that educators felt "betrayed" by the proposal and highlighted that there had been a decrease of 1,200 public school teachers in the state over the last two years. Speaking later about Governor Caperton, President Christain said that the $32 million in savings that the government had gained from the teacher reduction plan was supposed to have gone towards remaining teachers' salaries, saying, "The governor lost credibility when he took that $32 million and put it somewhere else."

=== Negotiations between the government and unions ===
On February 15, several thousand members of the state's two teachers' unions staged a demonstration at the West Virginia State Capitol in Charleston, West Virginia, with additional demonstrating taking place on March 2 and 3. Additionally, the unions discussed a possible strike action. Following this, Governor Caperton engaged in negotiations with union leaders concerning a labor agreement.

On March 5, the governor and the unions reached a tentative agreement that would have seen the teachers receive a five percent pay increase and a continuance on the government's policy of paying the entire cost for the benefits of their health insurance. This agreement would cost the state government approximately $41.5 million ($102.3 million in 2025)—$35 million ($86 million in 2025) for the pay increase and $6.5 million ($16.0 million in 2025) for the health insurance benefits—and would be covered through a tax increase in coal production and the closing of a tax loophole that had been designed to attract new businesses to the state. The deal would not conflict with the governor's goal of securing a balanced budget. In exchange, the unions would lobby for the deal in the West Virginia Legislature and would drop their threats of striking.

On the morning of March 6, Governor Caperton announced that the tentative deal had fallen apart, saying that the WVEA had not stopped threating a strike action. In response, the WVEA accused the governor of reneging on the deal, claiming that he did not have enough support in the legislature to pass the legislation needed for the tax increase. Union officials also said that they were concerned about a salary adjustment system that the government would institute and whether it would result in teachers receiving the agreed-upon five percent salary increase. William McGinley, the general counsel for the WVEA, criticized the salary proposal as containing "sketchy figures", further saying, "It was clearly not five percent across the board." President Meadows also said that the union had agreed to end their threats of striking only for the remainder of the legislative session, which had been tentatively scheduled to end on March 10 unless an agreement on the state's budget was not reached by that time. According to Meadows, the decision was due to a situation three years ago where a legislative session ended without a salary increase for teachers despite assurances to the legislators that the union would not strike. According to reporting on the negotiations by Education Week, by March 7, it became evident that the governor would not be proposing the necessary legislation to the legislature.

== Course of the strike ==
=== Early activities ===
The strike began on March 7. According to union officials, the decision to strike was made by members at the county level, and as a result, some counties began to vote to authorize striking that day. Members of both the WVEA and the WVFT were involved in the strike. On the night of March 7, Governor Caperton addressed a joint session of the legislature about the strike, defending the tentative agreement that he had reached with the unions and saying that he would refuse to negotiate with them further until the strike had ended. On March 8, President Meadows said that she would be willing to meet with the governor, but was not willing to end the strike.

On March 8, Roger W. Tompkins II, the attorney general of West Virginia, declared that the strike action was illegal. At the time, the state's laws did not allow for teachers to engage in collective bargaining, and his office based their official opinion on precedent, the language of the teachers' contracts, and a constitutional right found in the Constitution of West Virginia for students to have a "thorough and efficient education". Per the attorney general's office, striking teachers could face punishments that included a pay forfeiture, suspension, termination, and a prohibition from teaching for a year. Strikers could also face criminal charges of misdemeanors.

=== Strike spreads ===
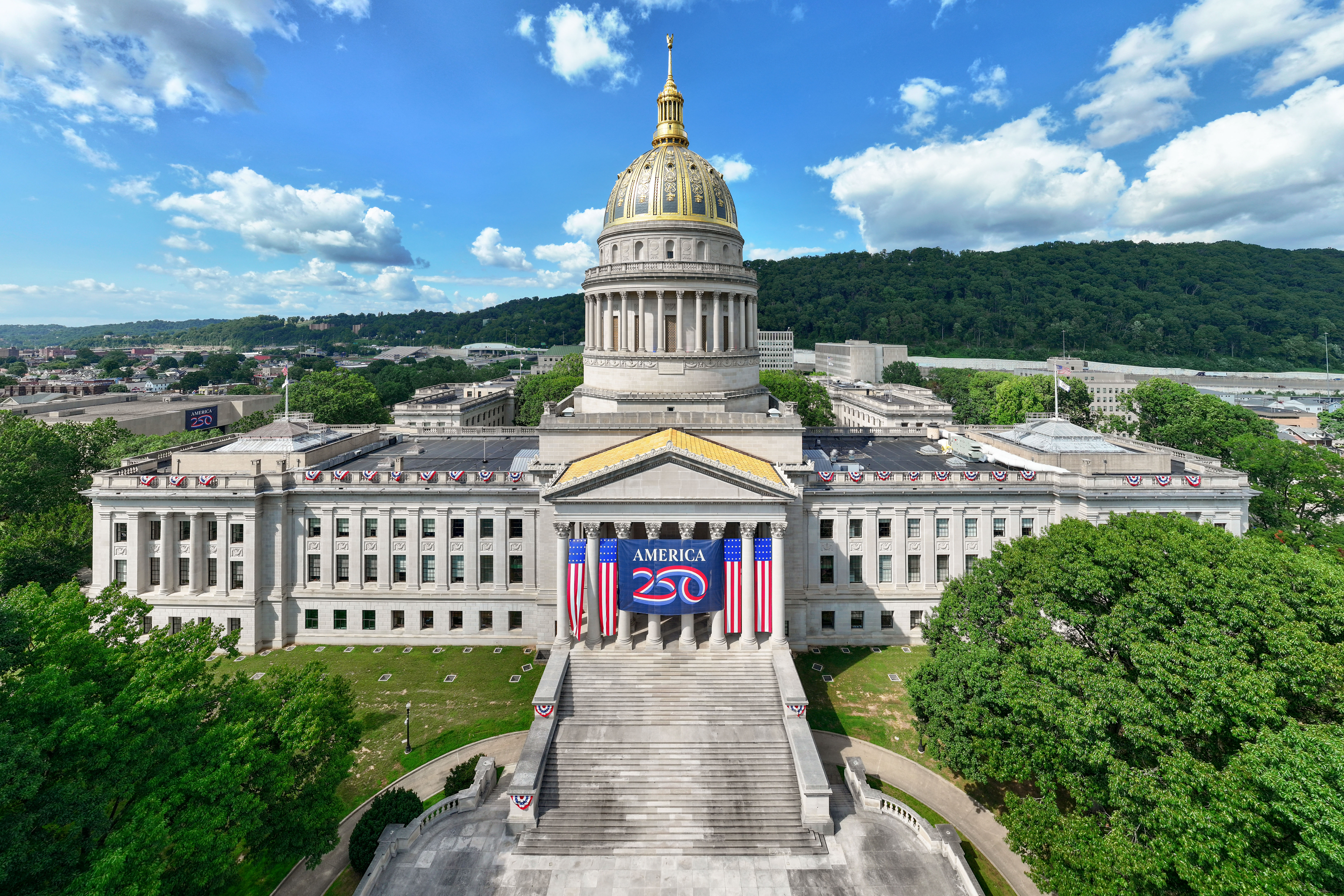
The West Virginia State Capitol (pictured 2026) was the site of significant protesting during the strike.

By March 8, teachers in nine counties were on strike, affecting over half of the state's public schools. According to a WVEA spokesperson, teachers in 13 additional counties were expected to join in striking soon. By the following day, teachers in 39 counties were on strike, with about 100,000 pupils—equivalent to about a third of the state's total—being unable to attend classes as a result. Per the WVEA, most of the affected schools had closed, while some continued to operate with reduced staff. Picketing occurred in locations throughout the state, including outside of several schools. In total, several thousand teachers were involved in the strike action, which affected several hundred schools. Within the first few days, seven teachers were arrested in Kanawha County for blocking a school bus. During the strike, numerous instances of protesting took place at the capitol, with about 10,000 people participating. During one such protest, striking teachers gathered inside the building and banged on the doors to the House of Delegates' chambers, chanting, "Let us in".

During the strike, Cabell County was one of the few counties that did not see any strike action and was the only one where teachers voted against it, with roughly 56 percent of the 900 teachers there opting against a work stoppage. As a result, strikers in other counties called it "Scabell County", a reference to "scabs", or strikebreakers. After teachers in neighboring Wayne County voted to strike, some organized picket lines in Cabell County, with about 200 non-striking teachers in the county opting against crossing the picket line.

=== Further developments ===
On March 9, Governor Caperton spoke of the strike, which he called an illegal act and "an attempt at intimidation" by the unions. However, later that day, he said that teachers who returned to work on Monday (March 12) would not face any punishment for engaging in striking, which could include a forfeiture of pay. At the time, both government and union officials said that they would be willing to resume talks, but could not agree on the terms, with government officials saying that discussions would only recommence after the teachers returned to work. That same day, Keith Burdette, the president of the Senate, spoke to several protestors inside the Senate chambers.

On March 10, teachers around the state began to vote on whether to end the strike and return to work, pursuant to the governor's offer. A majority of the voters selected to return to work on March 12, but union officials disregarded the results and said that the strike would continue until the governor agreed to call a special session of the legislature to address teachers' pay. According to reporting from The New York Times, prior to the vote, union officials had believed that a special session would be called within the next several weeks. However, the governor said that he had no immediate plans to call such a session, though a spokesperson for his office said it remained a possibility. Around this same time, State Superintendent of Schools Hank Marockie met with the superintendents from 55 counties in Charleston and discussed how it was their responsibility to punish teachers who remained on strike.

By March 12, the strike had spread to 46 counties, with 29 counties canceling classes completely, affecting about 150,000 students. That day, Governor Caperton met with Presidents Brown and Meadows at the capitol, with hundreds of protestors outside. Keith Geiger, the president of the NEA, spoke to the demonstrators outside of the building. By this time, county officials in several areas of the state had taken measures against the strikers. In Greenbrier County, the local board of education told strikers that they would be fired if they did not cease striking by March 14. In Jefferson County, a judge of the West Virginia Circuit Courts issued an injunction mandating teachers to return to work by March 15.

=== Governor's proposal and supreme court rulings ===
On March 13, after two days of negotiations with union representatives, Governor Caperton announced a proposal to end the strike. Per the terms of the proposal, the governor would work with the state legislature to allocate $20 million ($49 million in 2025) to "equalize" salaries across the state, which would amount to a roughly 4 percent wage increase. Additionally, $3 million ($7 million in 2025) would be moved from a fund purposed for purchasing computers for elementary schools to teachers' salaries, which would amount to a 0.5 percent wage increase. Furthermore, he said that he would hold an "education summit" in May and would call a special session of the legislature "if sufficient surplus revenues are realized in the present budget year". The proposal made no mention of a coal tax, with Education Week reporting that the tax had been unlikely to pass due to the strong lobbying power of the coal industry in the state. In response, union representatives said that the proposal was "too vague", with President Meadows calling for more "concrete improvements". On March 14, protestors held a rally throughout Charleston, with venues including the capitol and Laidley Field. A day later, a candlelight vigil was held at the capitol.

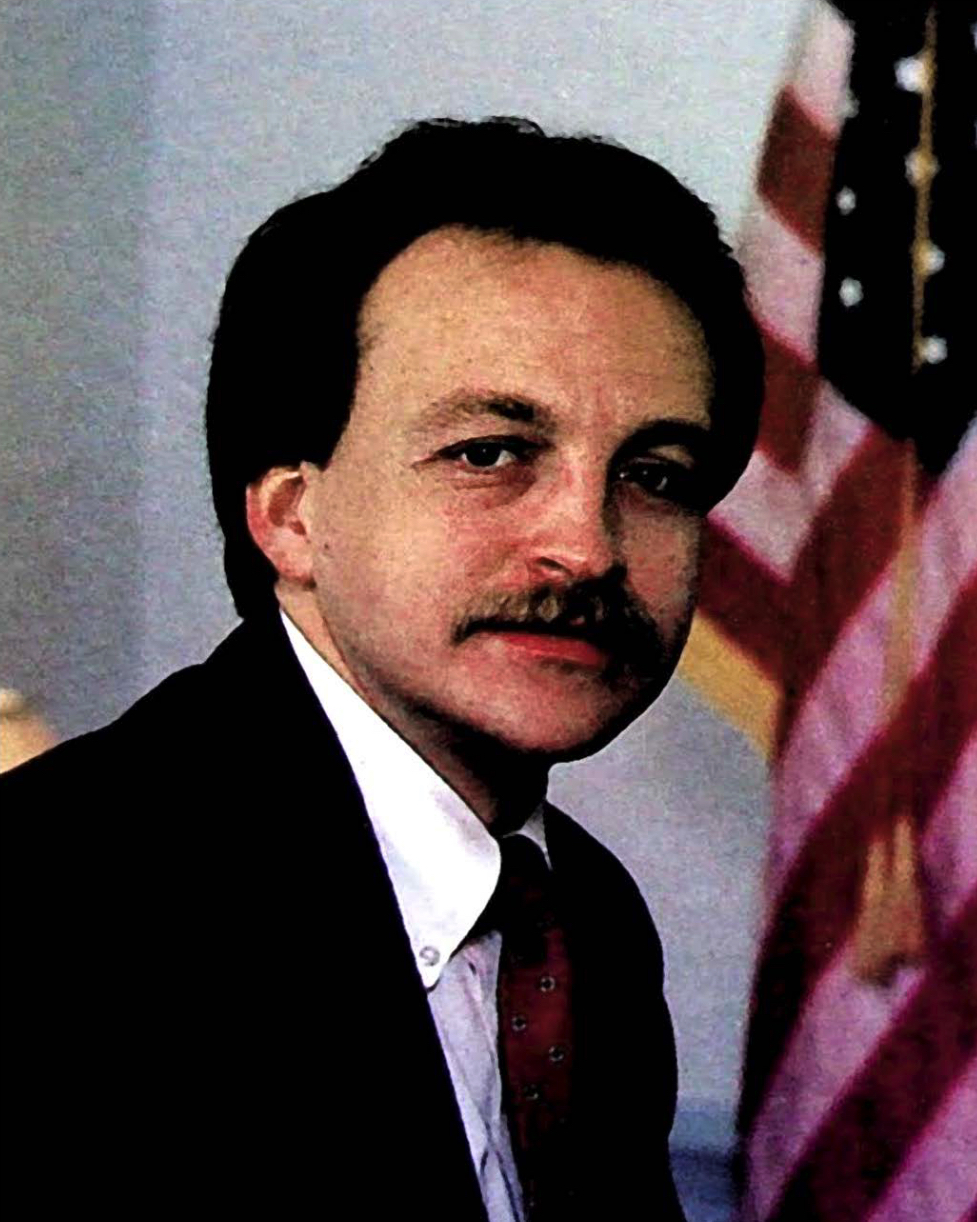
On March 15, union leaders began to negotiate with legislators Robert Charles Chambers (pictured c. 1987) and Keith Burdette.

Following the unions' rejection of the proposal, Governor Caperton announced that he would no longer be engaging in negotiations. Following this, beginning on March 15, union leaders began to negotiate with leaders of the legislature, including Senate President Burdette and Robert Charles Chambers, the speaker of the West Virginia House of Delegates. On March 16, the Supreme Court of Appeals of West Virginia upheld the injunction issued by the Jefferson County judge ordering a return to work, ruling that the circuit court judges could issue injunctions at the county level. Following the decision, Attorney General Tompkins was granted an injunction from a circuit court judge in Kanawha County that would have ordered striking teachers statewide to return to work. However, shortly after this, the supreme court, at the request of the teachers' unions, issued a stay of execution on the injunction and scheduled a hearing on the matter for March 20. The unions were seeking to prevent a statewide injunction and argued that injunctions should be granted in each individual county.

=== End of the strike ===
On March 17, the unions recommended that teachers cease striking and return to work that Monday, March 19. The announcement came after assurances from Senate President Burdette and Speaker Chambers, who told the unions that they would advise the governor to call a special session of the legislature to discuss teachers' salaries and other education topics. The two said that if the governor did not call the session, they would advise their fellow legislatures to call the session independently. According to The New York Times, the unions were facing pressure from the court system, with President Brown saying that legal action had played a role in the union leaders' decision to call off the strike. On March 18, a majority of teachers in the state voted to end the strike, with a WVEA spokesperson saying that they expected schools would be operating as normal the following day. In several counties, the opening time for the schools was delayed by several hours in order to allow time for teachers to prepare, and several schools offered counseling services for staff members in order to address tensions between strikers and teachers who had crossed the picket line.

== Aftermath and legacy ==
The labor dispute was the first statewide teachers' strike in West Virginia's history. (Note: Attributed to multiple sources.) It lasted eleven days and saw the participation of teachers in 47 of the state's 55 counties. The teachers who were involved in the strike were not paid during the dispute and lost roughly $660 ($1,626 in 2025) in pay, as there had not been a strike fund to help support the participants. According to a poll of 405 state residents taken during the labor dispute, about half of the respondents were supportive of the strike and 64 percent were opposed to the state government's threats to dismiss the teachers. Per the AFT, no teacher was reported to have lost their job as a result of the strike.

In contemporary reporting of the event, reporter B. Drummond Ayres Jr. of The New York Times called the labor dispute "one of the most serious teacher strikes in the nation in recent years". At the time, teachers' strikes were fairly rare, with the exception of several one-day walkouts, with reporter Ann Bradley of Education Week comparing the West Virginia occurrence to the Florida statewide teachers' strike of 1968 that saw the participation of 30,000 teachers. It was the third teacher strike to occur in the United States in 1990, following walkouts in Utah and Washington, though both of those only lasted one day each. The West Virginia strike was followed several weeks later by one in Oklahoma.

=== Government actions ===
In the short-term, the state government agreed to allocate an additional $109 million ($269 million in 2025) towards the teachers' retirement program, as well as increased funding for their health insurance plans. Additionally, the teachers received a four percent salary increase, with the government allocating $27 million ($67 million in 2025). On June 25, an educational summit was held at the request of Governor Caperton which was chaired by former House of Delegates Speaker Lewis McManus. As part of the summit, a series of nine town hall meetings across the state were proposed to discuss education matters with the general public, which the governor held later that year. On August 22, a joint session was held, during which the legislature agreed to wage increases of $5,000 ($12,322 in 2025) that would be implemented over the next three years. 40 percent of this money would be allocated in both the first and third year, with the remaining 20 percent being disbursed in the second year of the deal. The legislature also authorized the creation and funding for faculty senate programs, which allowed teachers to have more influence on the operations of the schools. The legislation needed for these changes was overwhelmingly supported by the legislators, with the House of Delegates approving it in an 88-4 vote and the Senate approving it in a 31-0 vote.

=== Later history ===
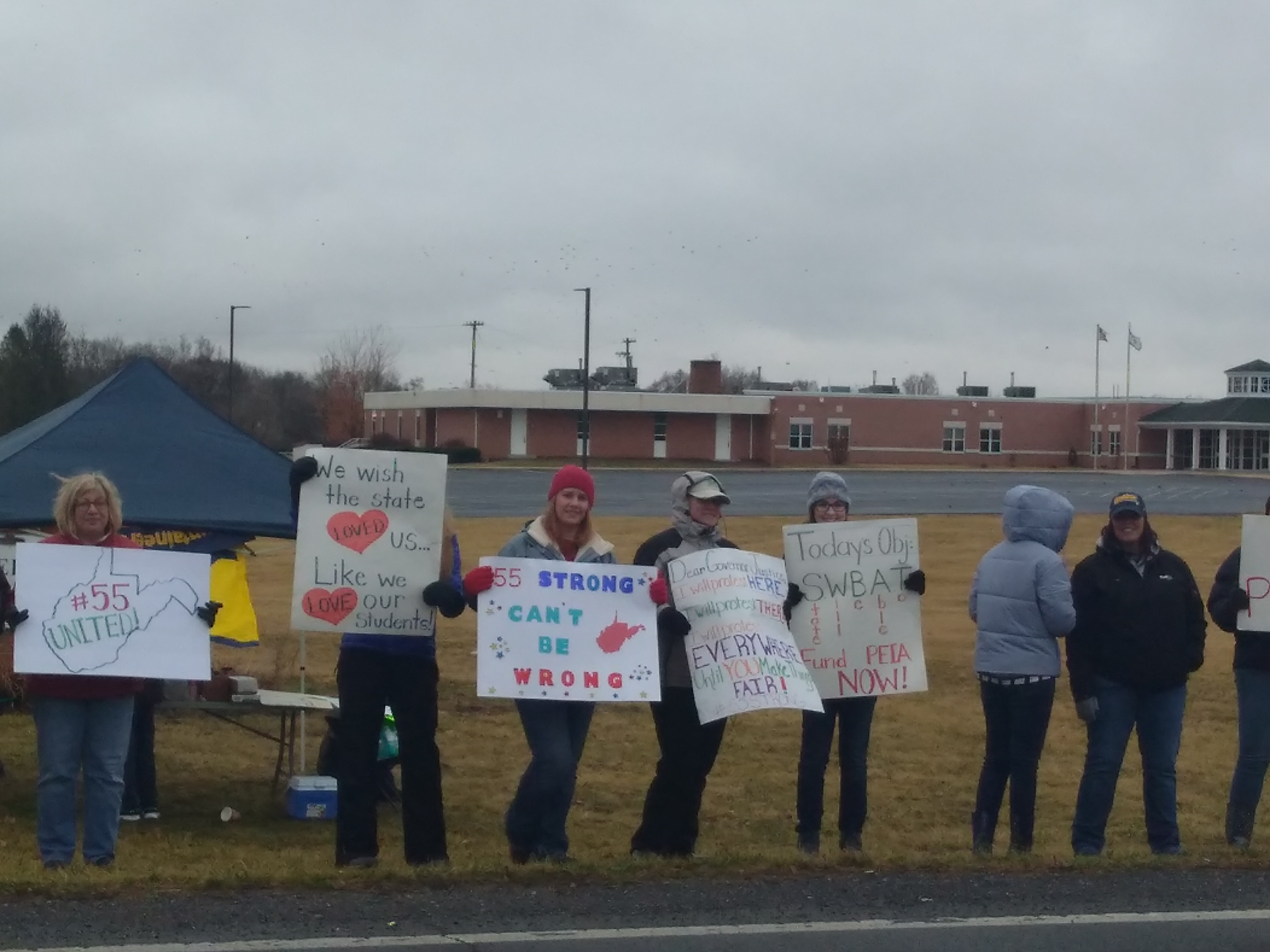
The 1990 strike remained the last statewide teachers' strike until 2018 (picketing pictured).

Following the implementation of the pay raises, West Virginia's ranking of teachers' pay rose to 34th out of the 50 states. However, starting around 2000, West Virginia began to decline again in national rankings of teachers' pay. In 2018, teachers conducted a statewide strike for the second time in West Virginia history, following the 1990 incident, prompting several media outlets to draw comparisons between the two events. In 2023, the West Virginia Mine Wars Museum in Matewan, West Virginia, opened an exhibit on teachers' strikes in the state, which included the 1990 event, called "The Children of Mother Jones: West Virginia Educators' Strikes as Care Work".

== See also ==
- 2018–2019 education workers' strikes in the United States
- Education in West Virginia
- Timeline of strikes in 1990
