= 2019 Virginia teachers' walkout =

- Part of the 2018–2019 education workers' strikes in the United States
- Date: January 28, 2019
- Location: Richmond, Virginia
- Methods: Occupation; Demonstrations; Internet activism; Walkout
- Result: 5% pay raise for teachers

Parties
AFL–CIO; American Federation of Teachers; Virginia Educators United; Richmond Education Association; Fairfax Education Association; Fairfax County Federation of Teachers; Industrial Workers of the World; Virginia Education Association	Government of Virginia

Lead figures
Keri Treadway; Sarah Pedersen; Cheryl Binkley	Jason Kamras; Levar Stoney; Rodney Robinson

The 2019 Virginia teachers' walkout (also known as RedForEd) is a teachers' walkout and protest that began on January 28, 2019, with teachers in Virginia walking out in protest of low school budgets and low teacher wages outside of Northern Virginia. Crowd sizes have been estimated between 2,500 and 3000 people. While this action coincided with Virginia Education Association lobby day, it was a grassroots organization of classroom teachers who organized the walkout.

== Background ==
The walkout was influenced in part of the larger wave of teachers' strikes in the United States, especially in the wake of the teacher's strike in Los Angeles.

== Response ==
The Virginia House of Delegates' leadership proposed in the 2019–20 fiscal budget a five percent pay raise for teachers across the Commonwealth.

== See also ==
- VCUarts adjunct workers' protests
