= Timeline of strikes in 1990 =

Strikes in 1990

In 1990, a number of labour strikes, labour disputes, and other industrial actions occurred.

== Background ==
A labour strike is a work stoppage caused by the mass refusal of employees to work. This can include wildcat strikes, which are done without union authorisation, and slowdown strikes, where workers reduce their productivity while still carrying out minimal working duties. It is usually a response to employee grievances, such as low pay or poor working conditions. Strikes can also occur to demonstrate solidarity with workers in other workplaces or pressure governments to change policies.

== Timeline ==
=== Continuing strikes from 1989 ===
- 1989–90 British Aerospace strike, 5-month strike by British Aerospace calling for a 35-hour work week.
- 1989–1990 British ambulance strike
- 1986–90 Colt strike, 4-year strike by Colt Firearms workers in the United States.
- 1990s Donbas miners' strikes
- First Intifada, including strikes, against the Israeli occupation of Palestine.
- Karabakh movement, including strikes, in the Armenian Soviet Socialist Republic, demanding transfer of the Nagorno-Karabakh Autonomous Oblast to Armenia.
- Pittston Coal strike
- 1989–90 South African rail strike
- 1988–91 United States jai alai strike, 3-year strike by jai alai players in the United States.
- 1989–1990 unrest in Benin
- 1988–90 Zimbabwe healthcare strikes, series of strikes by healthcare workers, including doctors and nurses, in Zimbabwe.

=== January ===
- 1990 Ford UK strike

=== February ===
- 1990 Bacton Fashions strike, in the United Kingdom.
- 1990 Corona strike, 7-week strike by Corona brewery workers in Mexico.
- 1990 Finnish bank strike
- 1990 Hawaiian hotels' strike

=== March ===
- 1990 Cuajone strike, by copper miners at the Cuajone mine in Peru.
- 1990-93 Greyhound strike, by Greyhound Lines drivers.
- 1990–1992 movement in Madagascar
- 1990 West Virginia teachers' strike

=== April ===
- 1990 Californian healthcare strike
- 1990 Waterford strike, 14-week strike by Waterford Crystal glass workers in Ireland.

=== May ===
- 1990 Bronx-Lebanon Hospital Center strike

=== July ===
- 1990 Nicaraguan public sector strike
- 1990 Norwegian oil workers' strike

=== September ===
- 1990 Congolese Trade Union Confederation strikes, 2-month series of strikes by the Congolese Trade Union Confederation in the Republic of the Congo demanding legal trade union independence.
- 1990 Delta Pride strike, a 3-month strike against the Delta Pride catfishing processing cooperative in Sunflower County, Mississippi, United States

=== October ===
- 1990–1991 New York Daily News strike, 5-month strike by New York Daily News staff.
- 1990–1991 Togo protests
- 1990 Ukrainian student hunger strike, pro-democracy hunger strike by students in the Ukrainian Soviet Socialist Republic.

=== November ===
- 1990 East German rail strike
- 1990–1991 Moroccan protests

=== December ===
- December 1990 Histadrut strike
