= Wildcat strike =

Strike action unsupported by a union

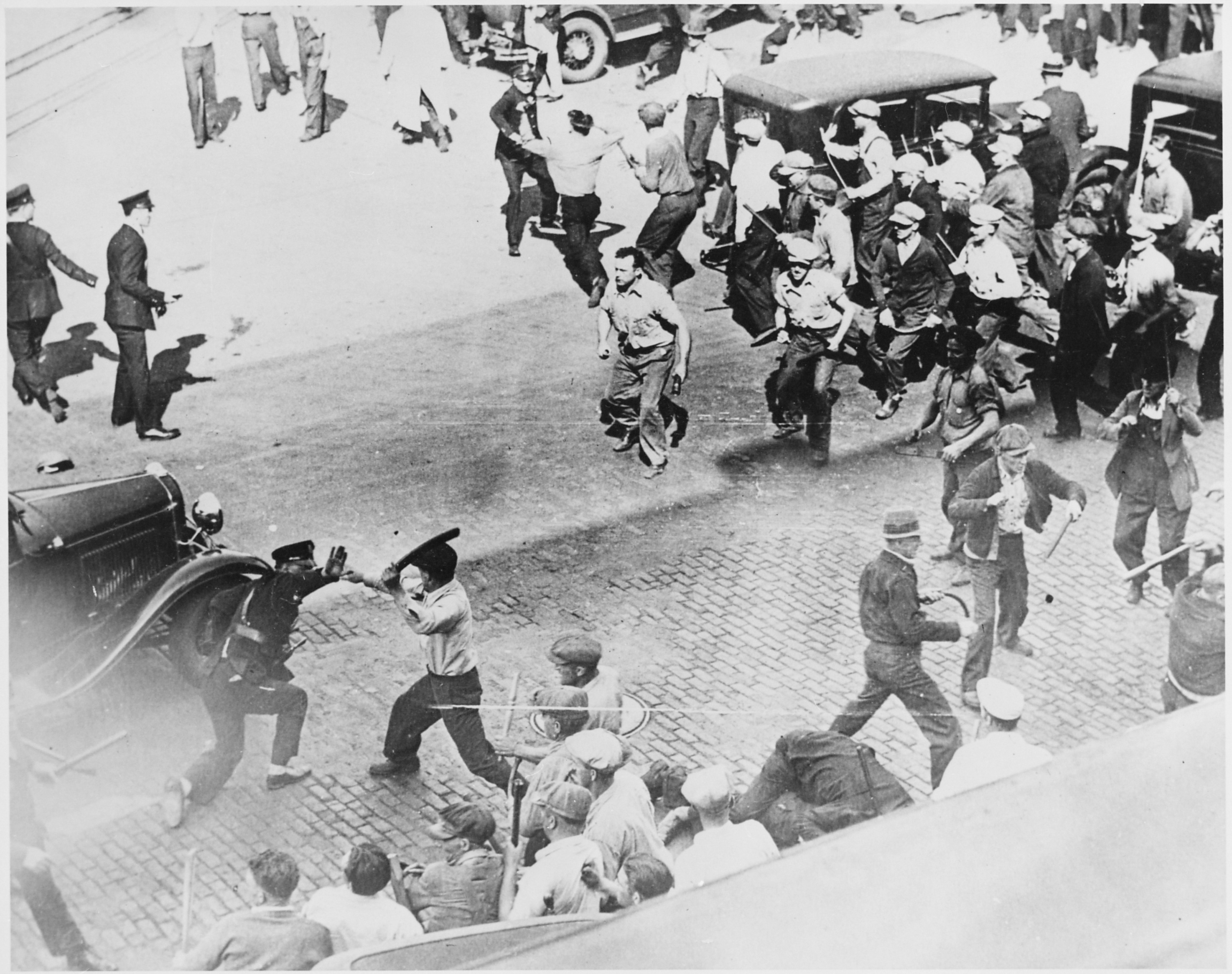
Street fighting with police during the Minneapolis general strike of 1934

A wildcat strike is a strike action undertaken by unionised workers without union leadership's authorization, support, or approval; this is sometimes termed an unofficial industrial action. The legality of wildcat strikes varies between countries and over time.

== By country ==
=== Canada ===
In 1965, Canada Post workers illegally walked out for two weeks and won the right to collective bargaining for all public sector employees. This resulted in them throwing out the leadership of the company union and forming the Canadian Union of Postal Workers.

On March 23, 2012, Air Canada ground employees suddenly walked off the job at Toronto Pearson International Airport, resulting in many flight delays, after three workers were suspended for heckling Canadian Labour Minister Lisa Raitt. This followed months of fighting between Air Canada and its other unions.

Hundreds of members of the Alberta Union of Provincial Employees walked out from their jobs on the morning of October 26, 2020 at healthcare centres across the province, resulting in some delays in care. This was in protest of an announcement made 2 weeks prior by Health Minister Tyler Shandro and Alberta Health Services CEO, Verna Yiu that between 9,700 and 11,000 AHS employees, namely laboratory, linen, cleaning and food services staff, will be laid-off in efforts to outsource the work to private companies, potentially saving the province $600 million annually. The Alberta Labour Relations Board issued a decision on the evening of October 26 for the employees on strike to return to work.

=== Germany ===
Wildcats strikes are seen as illegal in Germany, as they are not endorsed by a union as a party capable of entering into a collective agreement. Participating in a wildcat strike is considered a refusal to work and can be met by repercussions such as a warning or the termination of one's contract by the employer on an individual level. A union can however retroactively endorse a wildcat strike, therefore making it legal ex tunc.

=== France ===
Wildcat strikes were the key pressure tactic used during the May 1968 protests in France.

=== United States ===
==== Background ====
The motivation for wildcat strikes in the United States changed from the Depression era to the Postwar era in response to a variety of factors relating to businesses, the federal government, and unions.

==== Union coordination with working class interests ====
In 1939, the Special Committee to Investigate the National Labor Relations Board (often called the Smith Committee) was established by Republicans with the intention of weakening and eventually dissolving the NLRB. These intentions would attempt to be made law with the Smith Bill in 1940.

During the Depression, and prior to the bureaucratization of unions, leaders of different political philosophies tended to agree on the necessity and unique capabilities of local strike actions. Regardless of the organizational structure and direction, unions had no difficulty retaining these kinds of tactics within their toolkit. With the ascent of the Roosevelt administration, labor found a powerful ally in the struggle for workers' rights. With the changing role of the National Labor Relations Board, as determined by the New Deal National Labor Relations Act (shortened to NLRA, and also referred to as the Wagner Act) of 1935, a specific government entity began arbitrating grievances between workers, their unions, and employers. This represented a significant shift in governmental intervention in labor struggles.

==== Changes in union objectives ====
The United States' entry into World War II marked a critical shift in the role of unions in strike actions. The alliance between unions and Roosevelt's federal government meant that major unions like the Congress of Industrial Organization and the American Federation of Labor made an oath against striking for the war's duration in order to prevent disruption of wartime production, a show of labor's willingness to patriotically cooperate. However, both support and anxiety around this decision could be found within union leadership. Operating without a weapon to use when issues might go unresolved, and knowing that unions had voluntarily surrendered the weapon, posed a major threat to organizing labor during the war. Another concern that union leadership had was with its Communist members and other firebrands, as potentially inviting harsh repercussions from unity-minded politicians could underscore the inadequate strength of the labor movement to follow through on endangering production. Additionally, the political climate of wartime America and post-war America favored a bureaucratic union culture that adhered to an orthodoxy of institutional reform around relatively narrow objectives. Of increasing importance to union leadership was an alliance with the Democratic establishment, which demanded stricter control over union members and actions in exchange for some degree of political support in institutionalizing unions. Part of this emergent anti-radical platform was an easy embrace of the Taft–Hartley Act's anti-communist agenda, resulting in virtually all Communists losing their union positions in only a couple years.

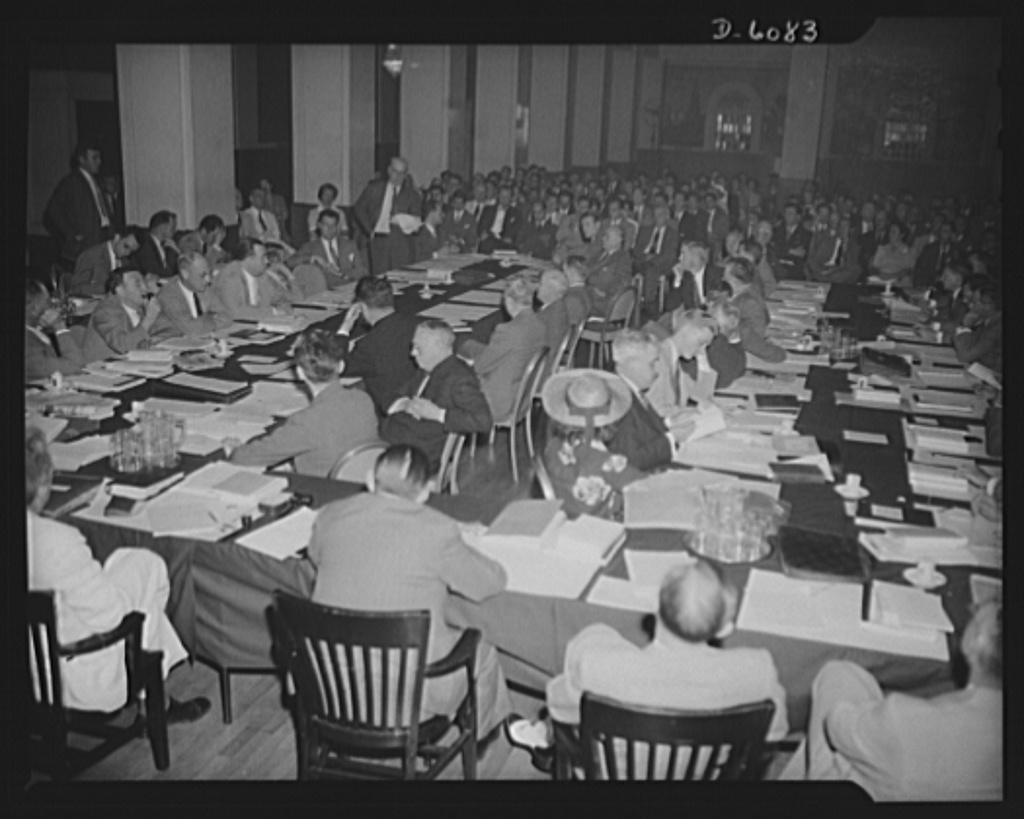
After the strikes of 1941, the War Labor Board held a hearing over the Little Steel companies' working conditions in 1942.

An early example of the tension between the substantially changing unions and their members can be seen in the wildcat strikes against Little Steel companies in 1941. Bethlehem Steel Corporation, Republic Steel, Youngstown Sheet & Tube, and US Steel (collectively referred to as "Little Steel") experienced a series of these strikes during the spring of 1941 in spite of strides in union-employer relations made under the oversight of NLRB and with the support of federal wartime programs. Little Steel had found that the benefits of federal profit guarantees made submitting to labor demands more viable. However, many of these springtime strikers held grievances with their own unions for an over-cooperative wartime attitude that placed greater value on New Deal institutions and programs than on disruptive actions to secure local concessions. A critical point of contention lay in the "no-strike pledge" that unions committed their membership to in response to wartime nationalism. As the war progressed, the emphasis on union-NLRB relations led to frequent and dispersed wildcat strikes in the steel industry; the new paradigm empowered union leaders over common members such that workers felt they had to take matters into their own hands, even if it meant risking expulsion from the union.

==== Taft–Hartley Act of 1947 ====
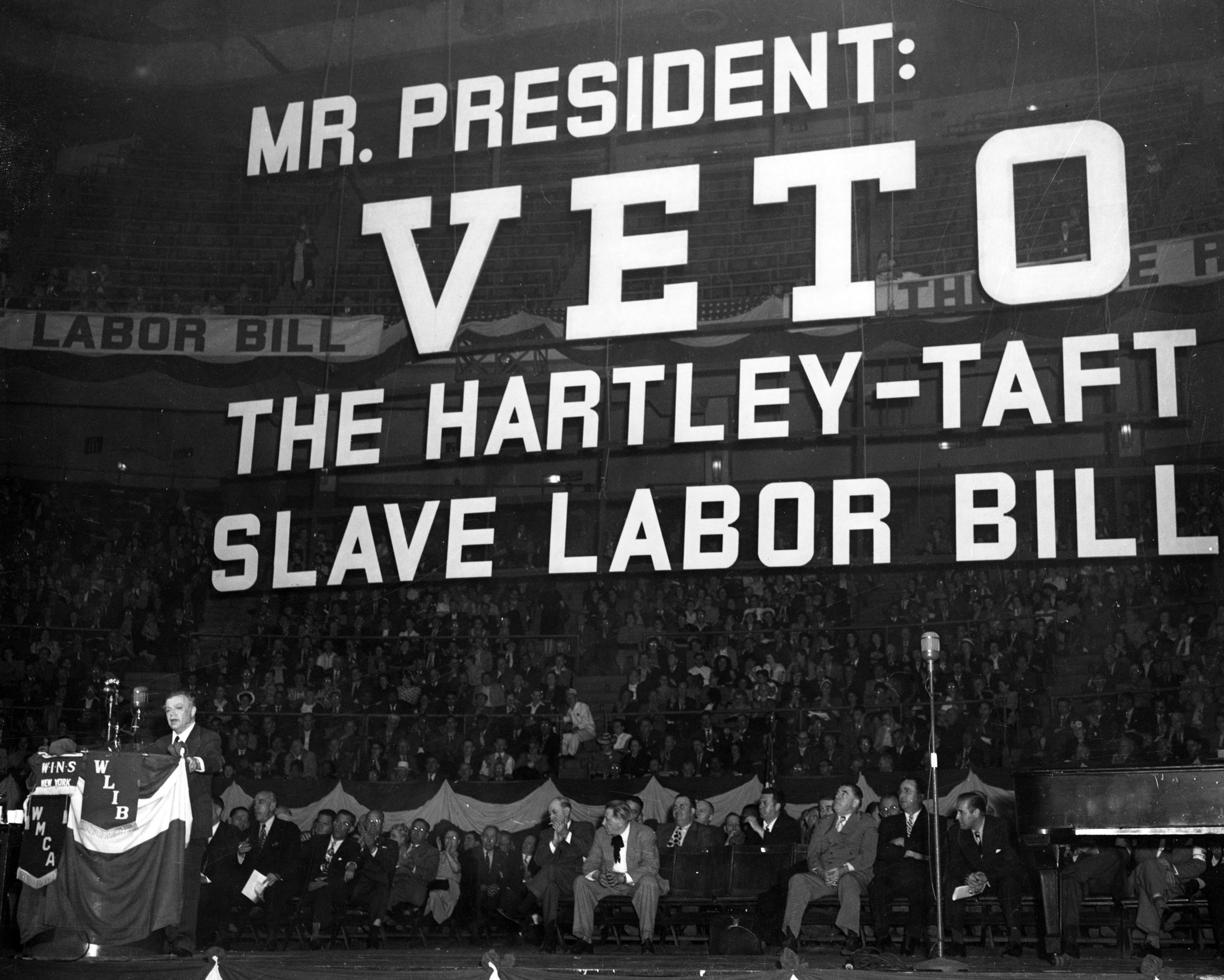
The Taft-Hartley bill garnered serious opposition from labor and labor allies, though they were unsuccessful in defeating its passage.

After a challenge by the American Liberty League, the National Labor Relations Act's Supreme Court confirmation in 1937 became a point around which corporate interests could rally in defense of business, with the ultimate goal of limiting the degree to which the act, and other legislation, could extend power to workers. The 1947 Taft–Hartley Act emerged partially as a consequence of the Little Steel Strike of 1937 and as a means to re-tool the NLRA away from labor protections and towards business protections. The earlier (and failed) Smith Bill of 1940 was used as a basis for reducing the culpability of companies in slow or non-resolving conflicts with labor, delegitimizing labor's right to strike without risking employment, and for placing greater responsibility on unions for the actions of their members. Taft-Hartley also included many clauses built to disempower unions, whether by guaranteeing workers the ability to work in union workplaces without membership, exclude a large number of employment statuses from inclusion in unions, or widening who qualified as a manager (notably, foremen and supervisors, who could no longer join unions as a result of this same act). The act helped to disunify unions across different industries, and even within industries, while supporting the development of a managerial class within workplaces to protect employers from union action. It also set off a wave of state-level anti-unionism that popularized the notion of union-free zones, providing a potent weapon to businesses facing union demands: the threat of relocation.

==== Postwar disillusionment with unions ====
During the postwar boom, union achievement of benefits for only some employees succeeded in removing pressure from their membership as a whole and demotivated radical action from those who had gained the most. With solidarity and sympathy striking effectively broken, employers had successfully quashed the unions' promises to bring universal benefits to their members and had certainly failed to benefit workers' rights for non-unionized workers.

==== Legality ====
Under the 1935 National Labor Relations Act (NLRA), federal courts have held that wildcat strikes are illegal and that employers may fire workers participating in them. Nevertheless, US workers can formally request that the National Labor Relations Board end their association with their labor union if they feel that the union is not adequately representing their interests. At this point, any strike action taken by the workers may be termed a wildcat strike, but there is no illegality involved, as there is no longer a conflict between sections 7 and 9(a) of the NLRA.

Some strikes that begin as wildcat actions, such as the Memphis sanitation strike and Baltimore municipal strike of 1974, are later supported by their respective unions' leadership.

==== Contemporary instances ====
In 2018, West Virginia teachers went on strike to demand higher wages and affordable health coverage. Without the sustained sanction of union leadership, this strike became a wildcat strike. In 2018, similar wildcat strikes by teachers demanding better pay and school funding also occurred in Oklahoma, Kentucky, Colorado, and Arizona.

In 2020, UC Santa Cruz graduate students went on strike to demand a cost of living adjustment (COLA) due to the high rent burden in Santa Cruz county. Later in 2020, the NBA, WNBA, MLB, MLS, and NHL all saw wildcat strikes in protest of police brutality after the shooting of Jacob Blake.

=== Vietnam ===
In Vietnam, all workers are required to join a union connected to the Vietnam General Confederation of Labor. Due to workers' distrust of this agency, nearly all strikes in the country are wildcat strikes.

== Notable wildcat strikes ==
- Pullman Strike (Illinois, 1894)
- Putilov Factory strike (Petrograd, Russia, 1917)
- Victorian Police strike (Australia, 1923)
- Ford Motor Company strikes during Reuther's Treaty of Detroit contract (Detroit, United States, 1953)
- Memphis sanitation strike (Memphis, Tennessee, 1968)
- May '68 (France, 1968)
- Chrysler wildcat strike (Michigan, 1968)
- Strike against segregation and racism in Chicago Public Schools (Chicago, 1968)
- UK miners' strike (1969)
- Strike for equal pay for female textile workers, Leeds and surrounding towns (UK). Inspiration for the film Leeds United.
- Strike at Pilkington glass works in St. Helens, UK (1970). This was the inspiration for the film The Rank and File.
- US postal strike (1970)
- 1972 Mead wildcat strike (Atlanta, Georgia)
- 1978 Memphis fire and police strikes (Memphis, Tennessee)
- Winter of Discontent (UK, 1978–1979)
- Jeffboat wildcat strike (Indiana, 2001)
- Dhaka strikes (Bangladesh, 2006)
- Toronto Transit Commission wildcat strike (Canada, 2006)
- Freightliner wildcat strike (North Carolina, 2007)
- 2009 Lindsey Oil Refinery strikes
- Spanish air traffic controllers strike, 2010
- Marikana miners' strike (South Africa, 2012)
- Alberta Union of Provincial Employees 2013 wildcat strike
- 2018 West Virginia teachers' strike
- 2020 Santa Cruz graduate students' strike
- August 2020 social justice strike by National Basketball Association (NBA) players, a strike that began on August 26 during the NBA Bubble in response to the league's inaction following the shooting of Jacob Blake; the league resumed action after an agreement between the National Basketball Players Association and the league was reached on August 28
- 2024-2025 MiHoYo/Hoyoverse voice actor strike, related to (but distinct from) the 2024–2025 SAG-AFTRA video game strike
- 2025 New York corrections officers' strike

There are some cases where union recognition of a strike is complicated. For example, during the year-long British miners' strike of 1984-5, the national executive supported the strike but many area councils regarded the strike as unofficial, as most ballots at area level had produced majority votes against the strike and no ballot was ever taken at the national level.

== See also ==
- Black cat (anarchist symbol), also known as the "wild cat"
- Blue flu
- Communists in the United States labor movement (1937–1950)
- School strike for the climate

== Sources ==
- Feurer, Rosemary; Pearson, Chad, eds. (2017). Against Labor. doi:10.5406/illinois/9780252040818.001.0001. ISBN 978-0-252-04081-8.
- Green, James R. (1983). Workers' Struggles, Past and Present: A 'Radical America' Reader. Temple University Press. doi:10.2307/j.ctv6mtdnm. ISBN 978-1-4399-1784-8. JSTOR j.ctv6mtdnm. OCLC 1060587482. Project MUSE book 59700.
- Lichtenstein, Nelson (2010). Labor's War At Home: The CIO In World War II. Temple University Press. ISBN 978-1-4399-0423-7. OCLC 806203257. Project MUSE book 9671.
- Sparrow, Bartholomew H. (2014). From the Outside In: World War II and the American State. Princeton University Press. ISBN 978-1-4008-6421-8. OCLC 884012522.
- White, Ahmed (2016). The Last Great Strike: Little Steel, the CIO, and the Struggle for Labor Rights in New Deal America. Univ of California Press. ISBN 978-0-520-96101-2. OCLC 1030354396.
