= 2019 Los Angeles Unified School District teachers' strike =

2019 teachers strike in Los Angeles, California

- Part of the 2018–19 education workers' strikes in the United States
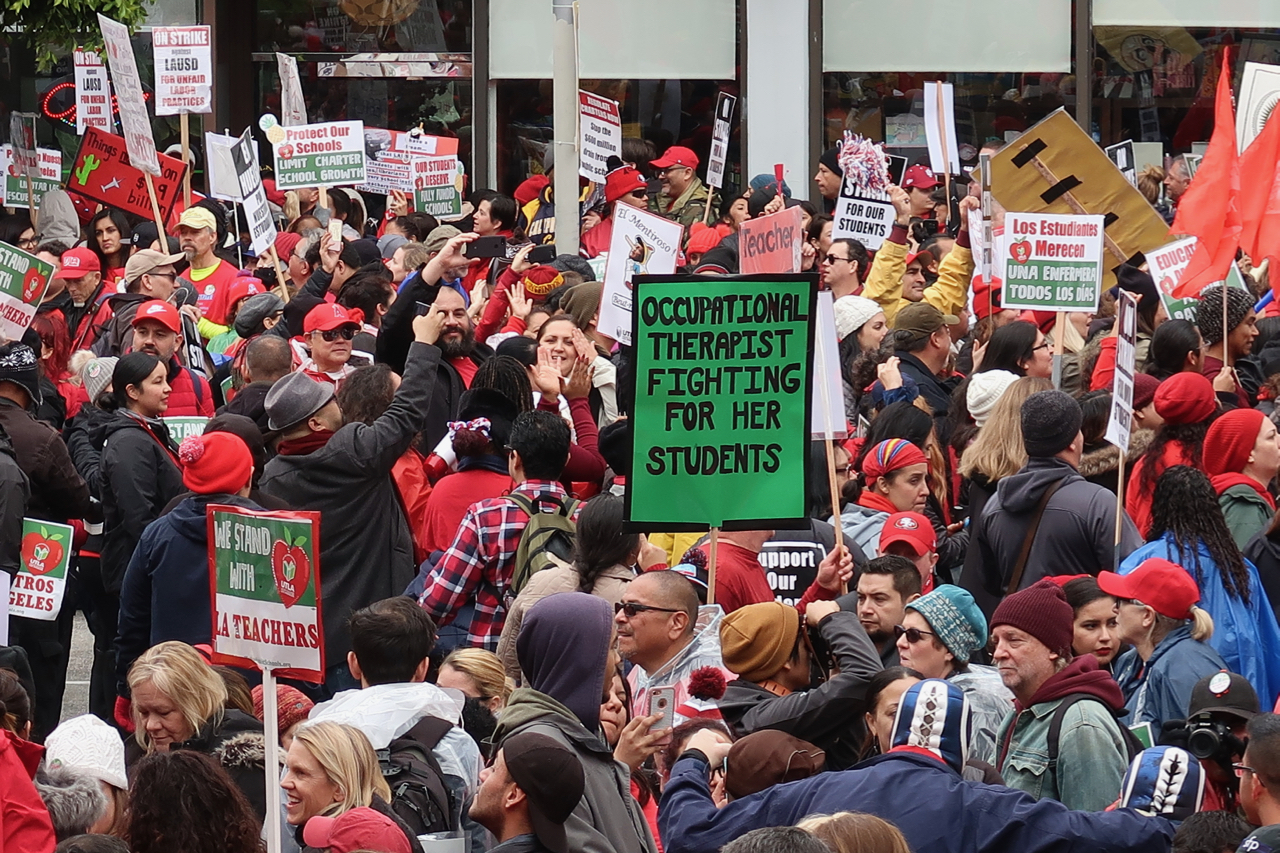
- Educators in Little Tokyo during the second day of the strike.
- Date: January 14–22, 2019
- Location: Los Angeles, California
- Methods: Occupation; Demonstrations; Internet activism; Walkout
- Result: 6 percent pay raise; Reduction in class size by 4 students over three years; Guaranteed nurse in every school; Guaranteed librarian for all middle and high schools; Establishment of 30 community schools

Parties
| AFT; CTA; NEA; UTLA; AALA | Government of Los Angeles; LAUSD |

Lead figures
| Randi Weingarten; Lily García; Alex Caputo-Pearl | Eric Garcetti; Mike Feuer; Ron Galperin; Austin Beutner |

Number
| 30,000 teachers | |

More than 30,000 public-school teachers of the Los Angeles Unified School District (LAUSD) went on strike from January 14 to 22, 2019. Protesting low pay, large class sizes, inadequate support staffs of nurses and librarians, and the proliferation of charter schools, the teachers went on strike for the first time in the district in 30 years. The strike was authorized by United Teachers Los Angeles (UTLA).

In August 2018, under the leadership of progressive UTLA president Alex Caputo-Pearl, 98% of UTLA members authorized a strike following months of contract negotiation disputes. Though teachers were also striking to highlight issues like demands for pay raises, public discussion became predominantly focused on the union's opposition to charter schools. Though one in five LAUSD students attended a charter school at the time of the strike, UTLA argued that largely highly-performing charter schools were siphoning money from underperforming unionized schools.

A fact-finding report failed to resolve matters and UTLA stated that a strike would proceed on January 10, 2019. The school district attempted to stop the strike on legal grounds, but a judge allowed it to proceed. On January 14, 30,000 teachers walked out of class and onto the picket line in what became the first such strike in LA in 30 years, affecting nearly 500,000 students in the second largest school district in the US. Schools remained open during the strike, with skeleton staffs of administrators and employees not on strike; two-thirds of students did not attend.

Following six days of crowded rallies, UTLA and the school district reached a new contract deal on January 22, ending the strike. The contract included teacher pay raises, full-time librarians for middle and high schools, a commitment to provide full-time nurses for every school, and the establishment of 30 community schools in the model of Austin, Texas and Cincinnati; UTLA failed to impose a binding cap on charter schools.

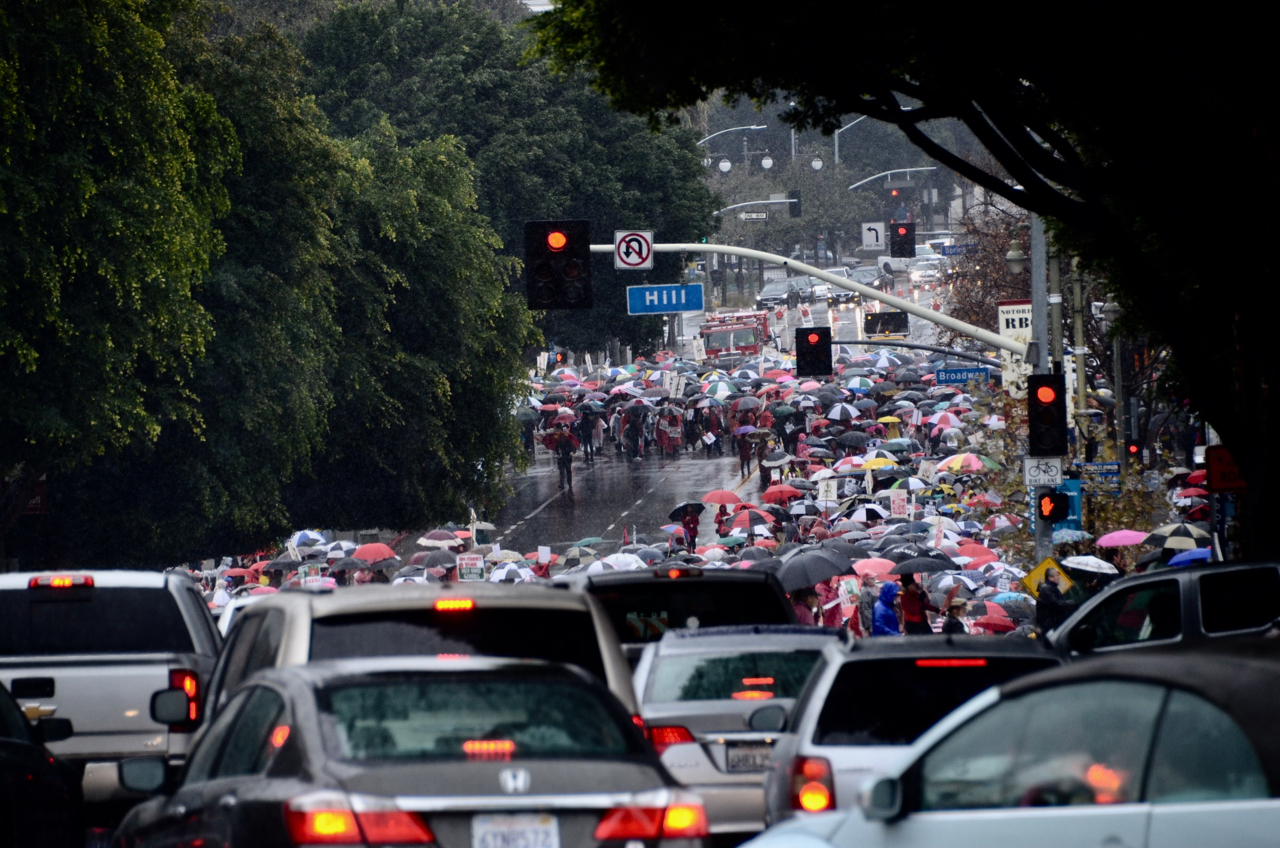
Day 1, Jan. 14, 2019. UTLA teachers converge in downtown, Los Angeles.

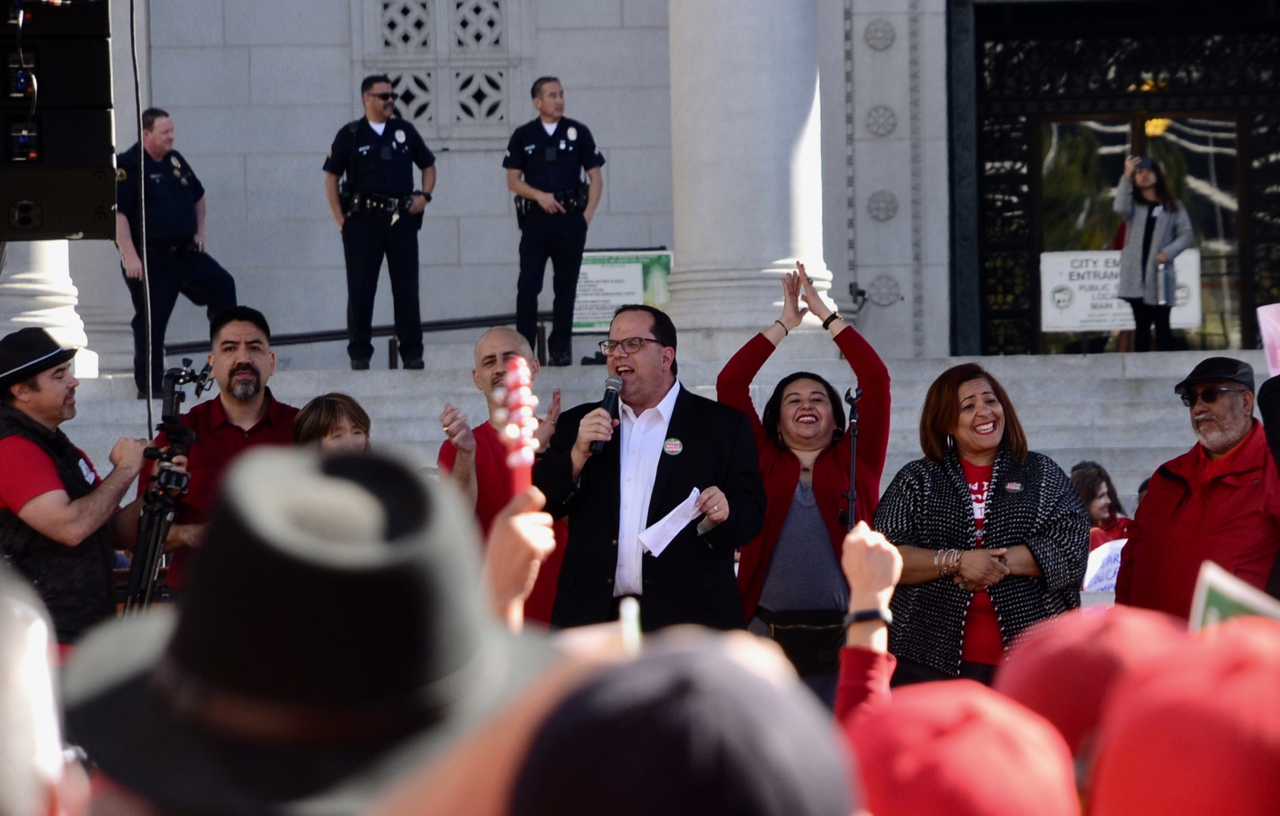
(Jan. 22, 2019, Downtown, LA) With the strike over, UTLA President Alex Caputo-Pearl and union officers thank strikers and supporters.
