= Courts of West Virginia =

Courts of West Virginia include:

State courts of West Virginia

- Supreme Court of Appeals of West Virginia
  - Intermediate Court of Appeals of West Virginia (Effective July 1, 2022)
    - West Virginia Circuit Courts (30 judicial circuits)
      - West Virginia Family Courts
      - West Virginia Magistrate Courts
      - West Virginia Municipal Courts

Federal courts located in West Virginia

- United States District Court for the Northern District of West Virginia
- United States District Court for the Southern District of West Virginia

Former federal courts of West Virginia

- United States District Court for the District of West Virginia (extinct, subdivided)
