= 2018–2019 education workers' strikes in the United States =

Withdrawal of labor by US teachers, 2018

2018–2019 teachers' strikes in the United States
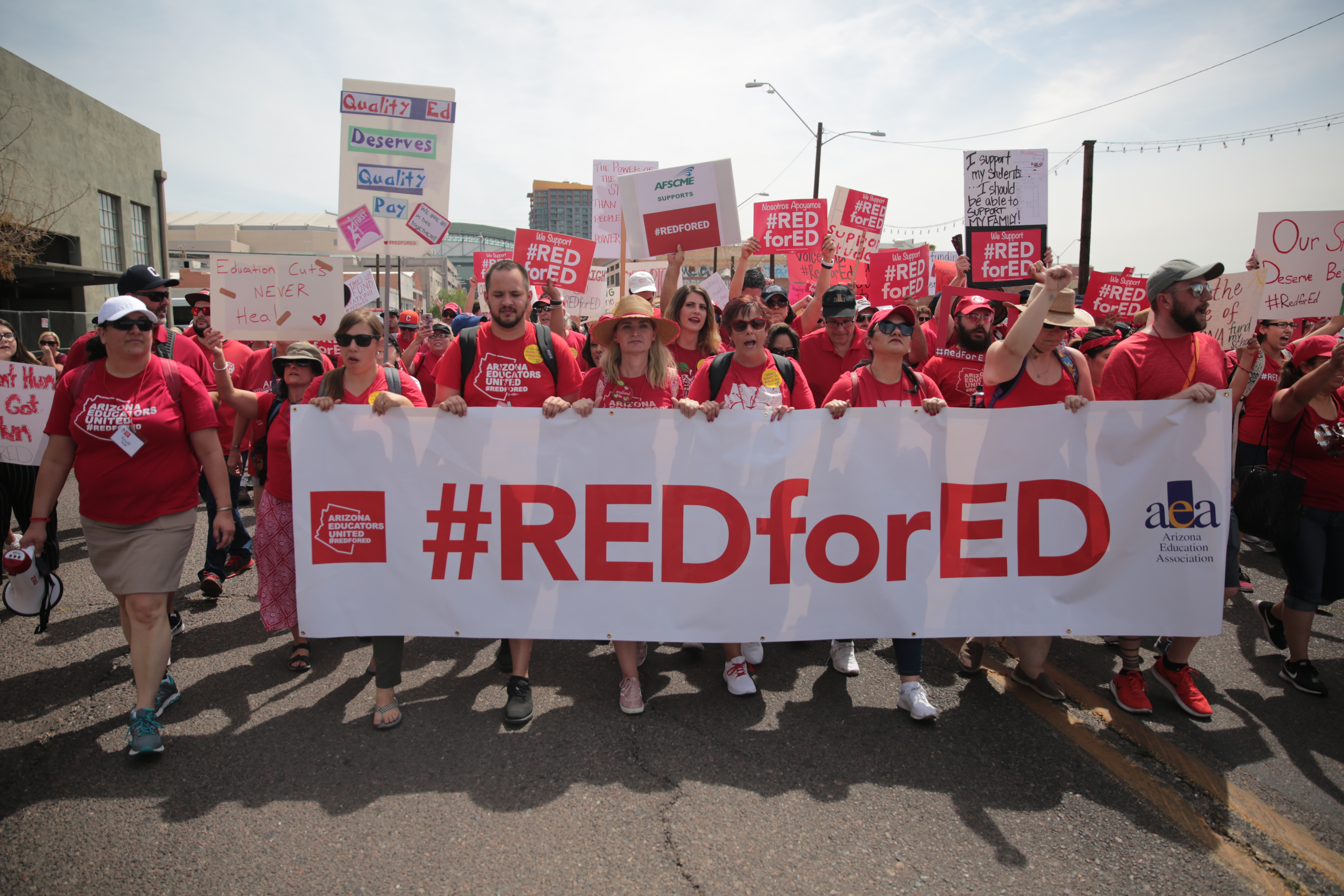
- Teachers striking in Arizona
- Date: February 23, 2018 – June 7, 2019
- Location: United States
- Caused by: Budget cuts; Low salaries; Decreased employee benefits; Low per pupil spending; Right-to-work law; School choice; School vouchers
- Methods: Civil resistance; Demonstrations; Strike actions; Internet activism; Silent protests; Sit-ins; Social media activism; Walkouts
- Result: Arizona: 20 percent pay raise; Colorado: 2 percent pay raise; increased school spending; Los Angeles 6 percent pay raise, class size reduction, increased support staff; Oklahoma: Increased school funding, teacher raises by $6,000, support staff raises by $1,250; Virginia: 5 percent pay raise; West Virginia: 5 percent pay raise

Lead figures
AFL–CIO; American Federation of Teachers; Democratic Socialists of America; Industrial Workers of the World; National Education Association; State education associations	State and city governments: Arizona; Colorado; Los Angeles, CA; North Carolina; Oklahoma; Virginia; West Virginia

Number
~20,000 in Arizona; ~6,000 in Colorado; ~30,000 in Los Angeles; ~30,000 in North Carolina; ~10,000 in Oklahoma; ~4,000 in Virginia; ~10,000 in West Virginia	

The 2018–2019 education workers' strikes in the United States began on February 22, 2018, after local activists compelled the West Virginia state leadership of the West Virginia branches of the American Federation of Teachers and the National Education Association into holding a strike vote. The strike—which ended when teachers returned to their classrooms on March 7—inspired similar, statewide strikes in Oklahoma and Arizona. It also inspired smaller-scale protests by school staff in Kentucky, North Carolina, Colorado, and led to a school bus driver strike in Georgia. Additionally, around this time, adjunct professors at Virginia Commonwealth University in Richmond, Virginia protested over pay.

The strikes continued in the fall of 2018 when there was a collective bargaining shortcoming between the United Teachers Los Angeles union and the Los Angeles Unified School District in September 2018, prompting a strike that began in January 2019. This also resulted in a teachers' walkout in Virginia, a long-time right-to-work state, as well as in Denver and Oakland, California. The national wave of strikes has been referred to as Red for Ed or #RedForEd, with striking workers often wearing red shirts to show solidarity. Reasons given for the choice of the color red range from the fact that many of the initial strikes were in red (Republican-controlled) states to the idea that public school budgets are in the red.

Motivations for the strikes included desire for increased wages for teachers and support staff, larger school budgets, smaller classrooms, and other issues. The strikes varied in their levels of success, with the West Virginia strike considered mostly successful, where Oklahoman teachers received relatively few concessions.

== Origins and overview ==
Discussions of a strike in West Virginia began in early 2018. In the first week of February, teachers staged "walk-ins" at schools and some protested at the West Virginia Capitol. The strike proved successful, and inspired those in other states to strike as well.

In early April, Oklahoma became the second state to strike, making it the first time a teacher's strike was held in the state since 1990. The strike lasted for nearly 10 days, from April 2–12, after teacher salaries were increased by $6,000 and support staff salaries were increased by $1,250.

In late April, teachers in Arizona and in Colorado went on strike. The Colorado strike began on April 27 and ended on May 12, while the Arizona Strike lasted from April 26 to May 3.

In May 2018, it was reported that teachers in North Carolina could be next to strike, making it the fifth state to have a teachers' strike. This was due to the state being ranked 41st in the nation in salaries for teachers, and per pupil spending at negative 12 percent. Further, it was reported that teachers in North Carolina have seen a five percent decrease in salaries since 2008. Furthermore, teachers hired after January 1, 2021, will not receive health benefits, along with teachers having to pay $10,000 per year in out of pocket health insurance.

Because of a majority of the strikes being in predominantly Republican Party-controlled, conservative states, the strikes have been referred to as the "Red State Revolt". This has prompted several Republican politicians to concede to their demands, in the run-up to the 2018 mid-term elections.

=== Pension costs ===
One of the largest reasons for decreasing teacher pay and less funding for schools is the large amount of money diverted from current budgets to pay educators' unfunded pension liabilities. For example: "In Colorado, school district payments to the public pension fund have roughly doubled since 2006, from about 10 percent of payroll to 20 percent."

A 2016 study found that only 30% of the money that school districts pay towards the retirement benefits of an educator actually go toward that educator's pension, with 70% being used to pay off unfunded debt in that pension system.

=== Demands ===
Universally, demands included raising pay. In Oklahoma and West Virginia, respectively sources of oil and coal, demands included financing the increased spending on education through taxation focused on these industries.

Original reason for the strike included the state's plan to force teachers to use fitbit to be allowed to keep subscribing to the same healthplan or face a $500 annual fine.

== Strikes ==

Strikes and protests lead to increase in education pay and funding.
Strikes and protests did not lead to government action.

=== Summary of strikes and protests by location ===
State	Location	Date started	Status of protests	Outcome
Arizona	Statewide	April 26, 2018	Ended May 3, 2018	Statewide strike; 20% salary raise for teachers by 2020; 9% raise for teachers in 2018–19 school year; subsequent 5% raises for the next two years; Increased support staff salaries
California	Los Angeles	January 14, 2019	Ended January 22, 2019	District-wide teachers strike; 6% salary increase; Reduction in class sizes; Increase in support staff
California	Oakland	February 21, 2019	Ended February 28, 2019	District-wide teachers strike; 11% salary increase over four years; Reduction in class sizes; Delay in school closures for 5 months
California	Sacramento	April 11, 2019	One-day strike	
California	Union City	May 20, 2019	Ended June 7, 2019	
Colorado	Statewide	April 27, 2018	Ended May 12, 2018	Teachers strike in numerous counties; 2% salary increase; Education budget restored to pre-Recession levels
Colorado	Denver	February 11, 2019	Ended February 14, 2019	District-wide teachers strike; 7 to 11% salary increase; Pay scale changes that increase emphasis on teacher training and experience
(Georgia (U.S. state)) Georgia	DeKalb County	April 19, 2018	Ended April 23, 2018	Bus drivers' strike in DeKalb County; Seven bus drivers fired; Ongoing collective bargaining between school district and bus drivers
Kentucky	Statewide	April 2, 2018		Teacher walkout in numerous counties; Protests at Kentucky State Capitol
North Carolina	Statewide	May 16, 2018	One-day strike	Teacher walkout in numerous counties; Protests at North Carolina State Capitol
North Carolina	Statewide	May 1, 2019	One-day strike	Over half of school districts forced to close
Oklahoma	Statewide	April 2, 2018	Ended April 12, 2018	Statewide teachers strike; $6,000 salary raise for teachers; $1,250 salary raise for support staff; Increased public school funding through tobacco tax
South Carolina	Statewide	May 1, 2019	One-day strike	Over 10,000 at state capitol; Several school districts forced to close
Tennessee	Nashville	May 3, 2019	Negotiations ongoing. Metro Nashville Public Schools has requested increased funding.	"Sickout" by Metropolitan Nashville Public Schools teachers.
Virginia	Virginia Commonwealth University	February 28, 2018	Ended May 12, 2018	VCU School of the Arts adjunct faculty protest; 25% wage increase for adjunct faculty
Virginia	Statewide	January 28, 2019	One-day strike	Teacher walkout in numerous counties; Protests at Virginia State Capitol; 5% pay raise for teachers
West Virginia	Statewide	February 22, 2018	Ended March 7, 2018	Statewide strike; 5% pay raise for teachers

== Major events ==
=== Arizona ===
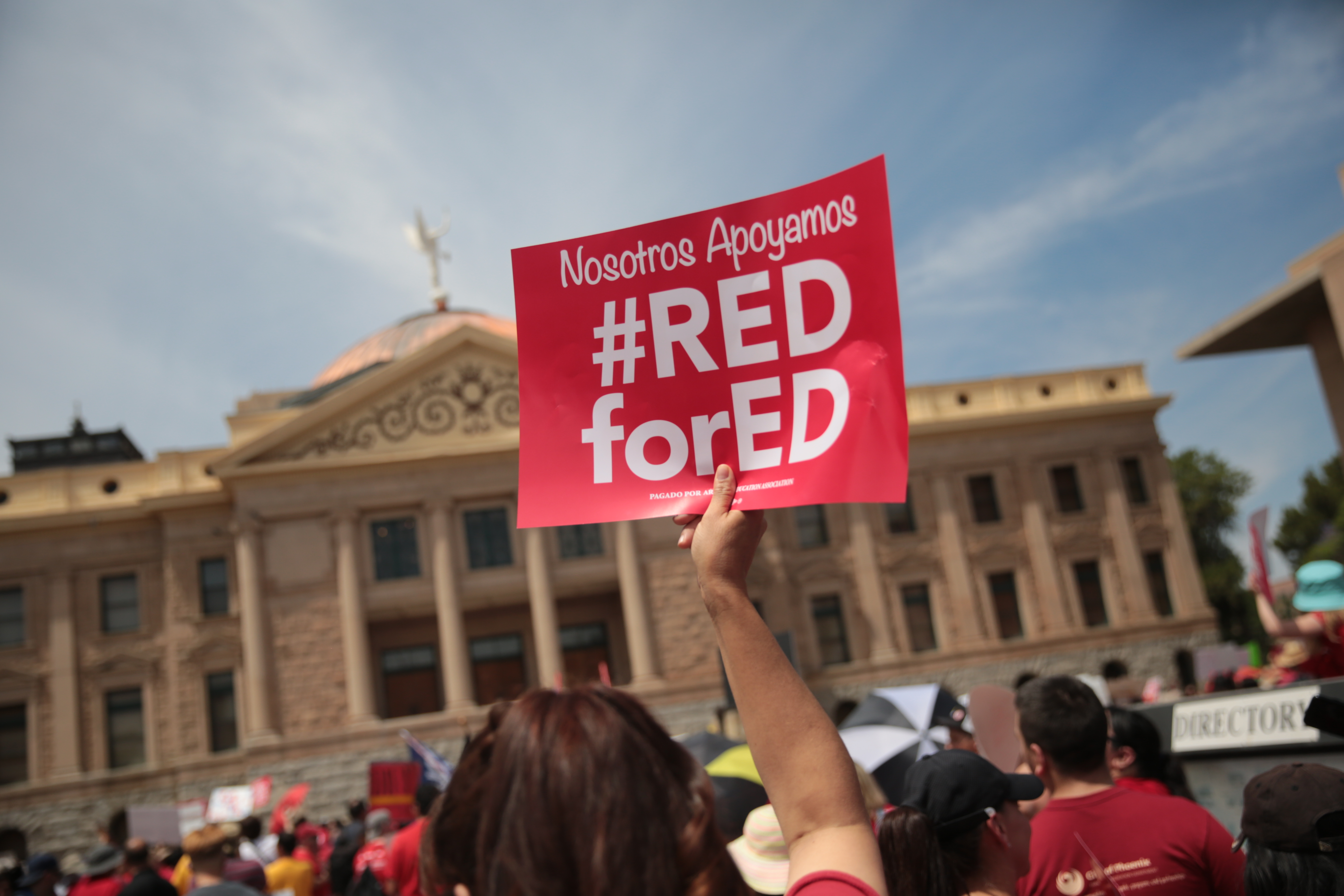
Teachers striking in Arizona at the state capital with the slogan Red for Ed. (2018)

== See also ==
- 2018 Colorado teachers' strike
- 2018 DeKalb County School District bus drivers' strike
- 2018 North Carolina teachers' strike
- 2018 West Virginia teachers' strike
- VCUarts adjunct workers' protests
- Labor history of the United States
