= 1990–1991 Moroccan protests =

Mass uprising and popular movement

1990-1991 Moroccan protests
- Date: November 27, 1990 – February 6, 1991
- Location: Morocco
- Caused by: Hardships and turmoil; Gulf War
- Goals: End to war and better wages; Fresh general elections; New government and end to hardships
- Methods: Demonstrations, General strikes, Riots
- Result: Protests suppressed by force

Deaths and injuries
- Deaths: 33

The 1990-1991 Moroccan protests was a mass uprising and popular movement that consisted of violent demonstrations and massive pro-Saddam and anti-Gulf War protests in 1990–1991 in Morocco.

== History ==
Protesters rallied in cities nationwide, starting in Fez, where protesters marched in rioting against bread prices and the Gulf War. Tens of thousands took to the streets in organised protests and planned strike actions, protests rallied that quickly turned into an uprising and popular Riots, calling on the fall of the regime. Five days of massive demonstrations swept small cities in Morocco in response to inflation and high prices. In Tangier, twenty days of strikes and general strikes were pulled out by thousands of workers calling for better wages. No deaths or fatalities were reported during the mass protests in Tangier.

At least 300,000 to 500,000 people demonstrated in Rabat to show support for Iraq in the Gulf War. The protestors held copies of the Quran and pictures of Iraqi president Saddam Hussein and PLO chairman Yasser Arafat. They burned American, British, French and Israeli flags and demanded that the 1,700 Moroccan and allied soldiers withdraw from the coalition fighting Iraq. The demonstrations were permitted by Moroccan authorities since war broke out on 17 January and security forces stood by and did not intervene. The protestors included 10,000 Islamic fundamentalists who chanted slogans criticizing American president George H. W. Bush, Saudi king Fahd, Egyptian president Hosni Mubarak and French president Francois Mitterrand such as "Palestine is Arab; Kuwait is Iraqi".

Huge student-led anti-government demonstrations and anti-Kuwait invasion protests were sweeping the Arab world, starting in Egypt, and inspired protesters in Morocco. 33 were killed during the rioting and the protests were quickly suppressed by the army and the army was deployed to patrol the streets in case of any protest actions and movement. 127-240 were injured during the echoes of anger in the country. Huge marches in support of both sides of the Iraq-Kuwait conflict were held in January–February; at least 100,000+ protesters marched. After the December rioting in Fez, curfews were imposed to quell the mass uprising.

== See also ==
- Moroccan Intifada of 1984
