= ZamPost =

About the Zambia Postal Services Corporation

The Zambia Postal Services Corporation, also known as ZamPost, is a state-owned enterprise in Zambia. ZamPost is the designated operator of postal services in Zambia. The history of postal services in Zambia dates back to 1896 when the first post offices were established at Abercorn, Fort Jemeson (present-day Mbala, Chipata), and the Kalungwishi River, near Lake Mweru. However, these post offices did not enjoy international recognition until 1926, when the General Post Office, which was then a government department, was admitted to the general membership of the Universal Postal Union (UPU). In 1975 by an Act of Parliament, a statutory body was established to run both postal and telecommunications.

In 1986, the organization was incorporated into a Public limited liability company and became known as Posts and Telecommunications Corporation (PTC) whose shares were held by the holding company ZIMCO, on behalf of the government. This was the status until July 1, 1994. In July 1994 the Zambia Postal Services Corporation (Zampost) was created under the Postal Service Act No. 24 of 1994 after the dissolution of PTC which separated the postal division from the telecommunications division. In August 2009 the Postal Services Act No. 24 of 1994 was repealed and replaced with the revised Postal Services Act No. 22 of 2009 which defined Zampost's mandate as providing postal and courier services, financial services including the creation of Post Bank.

The line Ministry for Zampost is the Ministry of Transport and Communication. The Line Minister is the appointing authority for the board of directors in line with the revised Postal Services Act no.22 of 2009. The Board provides strategic oversight to management. The Board delegates the day-to-day running of the corporation to the Postmaster General.

The Postmaster General is the chief executive officer of the corporation and has a team of five senior management staff heading different directorates in the corporation. These are; Director Operations, Director Human Resources, Director Finance, Corporation Secretary/Legal Counsel, and Chief Internal Auditor. The Government of the Republic of Zambia has 100% equity holding in the corporation.

With 146 Post Offices spread across the country, Zampost currently owns four functional subsidiaries namely; the Post Bus Company Limited, ZamPost Freight and Forwarding, and Zampost Travel and Tours.

The subsidiaries have their boards that provide oversight to the management of the subsidiaries. Zampost has developed a well-diversified service (or “product”) portfolio comprising mail and courier services, local and international money transfers, and other financial services. The corporation also provides several third-party businesses on an agency basis using its country-wide network strength as a retailing channel.

In May 2022, at the inaugural EU-Zambia Economic Forum in held in Lusaka, the government of Zambia signed an MoU with ASSECO of Poland, Europe's sixth biggest software company, to set up a € 10.0 million joint venture company to digitise and improve the operations of ZamPost.
