= Government of West Virginia =

- Great Seal of the State of West Virginia
- Polity type: Presidential republic Federated state
- Constitution: Constitution of West Virginia

Legislative branch
- Name: West Virginia Legislature
- Type: Bicameral
- Meeting place: West Virginia State Capitol
- Upper house
- Name: Senate
- Presiding officer: Randy Smith, President
- Lower house
- Name: House of Delegates
- Presiding officer: Roger Hanshaw, Speaker

Executive branch
- Head of state and government
- Title: Governor
- Currently: Patrick Morrisey
- Appointer: Election
- Cabinet
- Name: Cabinet
- Leader: Governor
- Headquarters: West Virginia State Capitol

Judicial branch
- Name: Judiciary of West Virginia
- Courts: Courts of West Virginia
- Supreme Court of Appeals of West Virginia
- Chief judge: William Wooton
- Seat: West Virginia State Capitol, Charleston

The Government of West Virginia is modeled after the Government of the United States, with three branches: the executive, consisting of the Governor of West Virginia and the other elected constitutional officers; the legislative, consisting of the West Virginia Legislature which includes the Senate and the House of Delegates; and the judicial, consisting of the West Virginia Supreme Court of Appeals and lower courts.

The capital and seat of government in West Virginia is the city of Charleston, located in the southwest of the state.

== Legislative branch ==
Like all states except Nebraska, West Virginia has a bicameral state legislature, the West Virginia Legislature. The lower house is the West Virginia House of Delegates and the upper house is the Senate. The West Virginia Legislature is a citizen's legislature or part-time legislature.

The West Virginia Constitution imposes a limit of 60 calendar days the length of the regular session. Regular sessions of the Legislature commence on the second Wednesday of January of each year; following the election of a new governor, the session starts in January with the governor's address but then adjourns until February. The session may be extended by concurrent resolution adopted by a two-thirds vote of each house. The governor may also call legislators to convene in special sessions whenever the governor deems one or more issues of state government in need of timely action by the Legislature. The final day of the regular session usually includes last-minute legislation in order to meet a constitutionally-imposed deadline of midnight. Legislators usually do not make it a full-time occupation, but frequently hold a full-time job in their community of residence. This differs from neighboring states such as Pennsylvania and Ohio, who have professional full-time legislatures.

The House of Delegates has 100 members. All delegates are elected to two-year terms and are up for election in even-numbered years, elected from 100 single member districts, thus each represents about 17,000 people. The Senate consists of 34 members from 17 districts, elected to four year terms. One senator from each district is elected in the presidential year and the other in the off year. Each senator thus represents about 105,000 people.

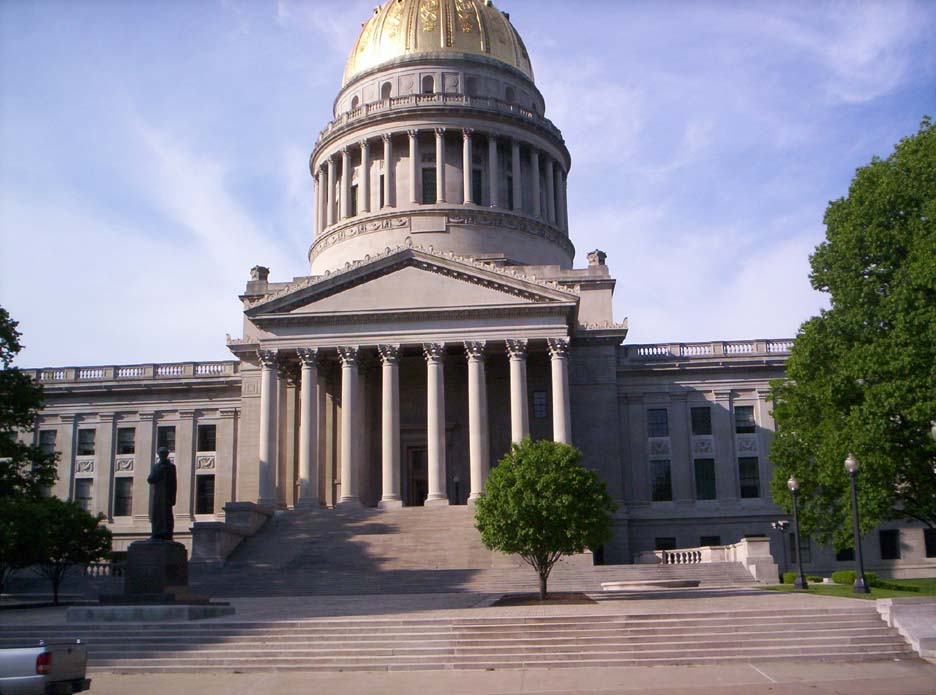
West Virginia Capitol Building.

The law of West Virginia, as determined and enacted by the legislature, is set out in the West Virginia Code. The common law of England, "so far as it is not repugnant to the principles of the Constitution of this state", continues to apply in the state, except to the extent that it was amended by "the General Assembly of Virginia" before 1863 or subsequently by the state legislature.

== Executive branch ==
The chief executive of West Virginia is the governor of West Virginia, who is elected to a four-year term at the same time as presidential elections. The governor is sworn in the January following the November election. A governor may only serve two consecutive terms. A term-limited governor may subsequently run for additional terms, but an interceding election must occur. Patrick Morrisey became governor on January 13, 2025.

In addition to the governor, there are five other directly elected executive offices:

- Secretary of State (currently Republican Kris Warner)
- Attorney General (currently Republican John McCuskey)
- Agriculture Commissioner (currently Republican Kent Leonhardt)
- Auditor (currently Republican Mark Hunt)
- Treasurer (currently Republican Larry Pack)

Regular elections are held concurrently with the election for governor every four years, but unlike the governor these offices have no term limits.

== Judicial branch ==
The state trial courts of general jurisdiction are the West Virginia Circuit Courts, There are 31 judicial circuits, each made up of one or more counties, with a total of 70 Circuit Judges. Domestic cases are handled by Family Courts. There are 27 Family Court Circuits with a total of 45 judges. Local judges are elected in non-partisan elections to serve eight-year terms on a non-partisan basis. Small claims and misdemeanor case are heard by magistrates elected for four years, with between two and ten in each county, based on population. Magistrates are not lawyers.

The West Virginia Supreme Court of Appeals is the state supreme court. There is an Intermediate Court of Appeals of West Virginia which only hears civil and administrative appeals. Criminal appeals go directly from the Circuit Court to the Supreme Court. By tradition, the position of "Chief Justice" rotates yearly. It primarily brings extra administrative duties.

== Local government ==
In West Virginia, the county is the unit of government, although an unsuccessful attempt to introduce the township system was made in West Virginia's first constitution.

Each of the state's 55 counties has a county commission, consisting of three commissioners elected for six years but with terms so arranged that one is up for reelection every two years, which is the legislative and fiscal authority. The county commissions were originally called county courts before legal reform stripped the commissions of their judicial powers in 1976. The county commission still retains the judicial function as the probate court, however.

Other officers are the County Clerk, whose primary duties are as recorder of deeds and voter's registrar; and a Circuit Clerk, who records acts of the Family and Circuit courts, both elected for six-year terms on a partisan basis; the sheriff, who has law enforcement and tax collection authority; the Prosecuting Attorney, who must be a lawyer and who not only handles criminal cases but also does the civil litigation for the county; an Assessor (the Constitution provides for a possibility of two, but no county has ever adopted that system), who determines the value of land for tax purposes, and a surveyor of lands, which has no official duties or salary except when the county commission contracts with the surveyor. All of the non-clerk jobs are elected on a partisan basis for four-year terms. The sheriff is term limited to two consecutive terms. In addition, there are boards appointed or elected by various authorities and charged with specific duties. They include the local board of health and the board of jury commissioners.

There is also a Board of Education, which is elected on a non-partisan basis, consisting of five members elected with overlapping terms similar to the county commission.

== See also ==
- List of governors of West Virginia
- Political party strength in West Virginia
- Politics of West Virginia
- West Virginia's congressional delegations
