= Barcelona Museum workers strike =

On 27 March 2018, Barcelona Museum workers launched a strike over perceived abuses of the employees' rights, including the safety of working conditions and alleged illegality of some contracts. The Spanish workers union "Solidaridad y Unidad de los Trabajadores" (Sindicato SUT) called the strike. The museums are managed by two companies, MagmaCultura and Ciut'art, that offer outsourced services such as ticket sales, security and surveillance at museums throughout the city. Prior to the strike, both companies insisted on the need for minimal services in the museums to ensure security. After negotiations, some were opened with minimal staffing.

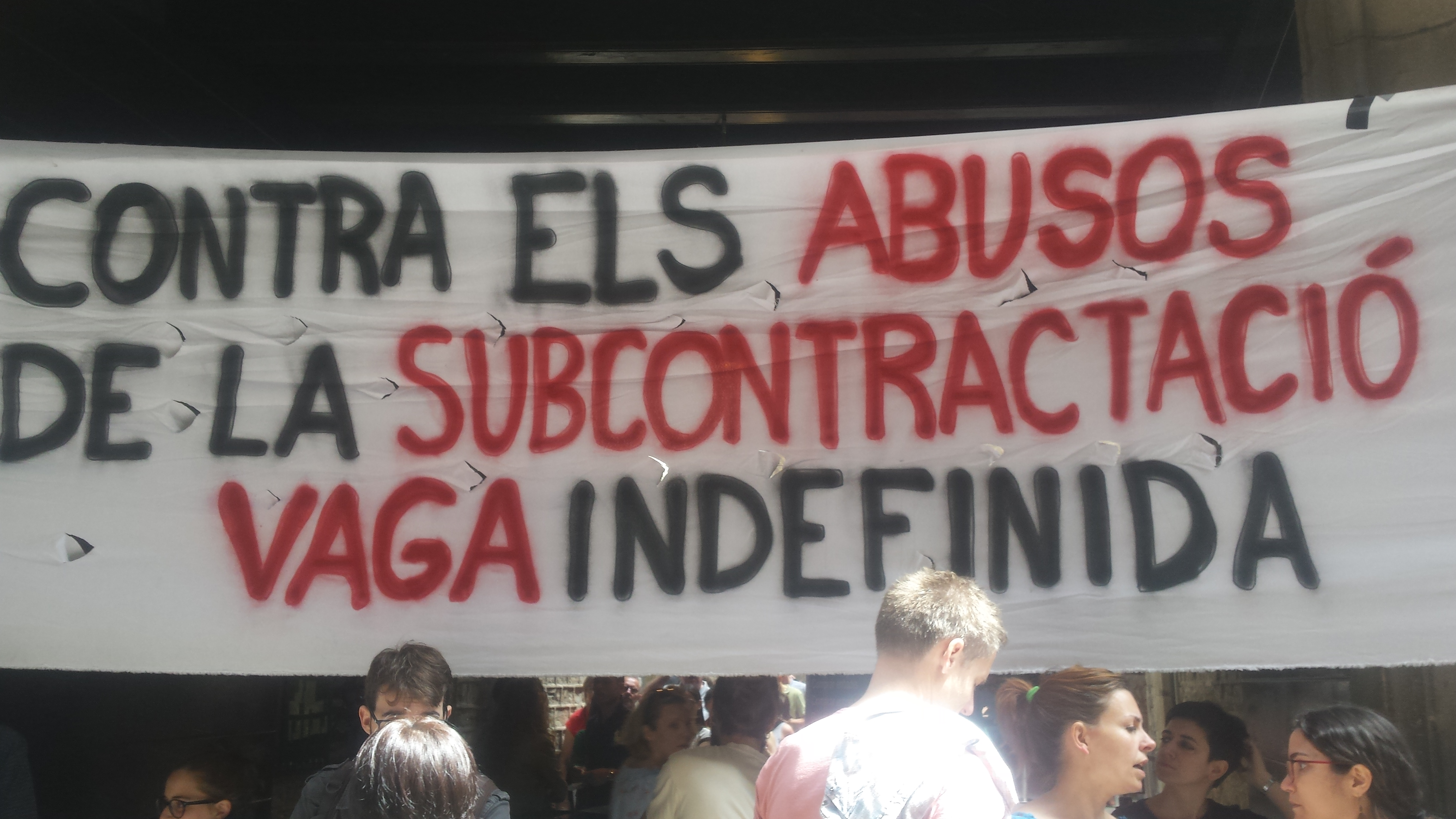
Photo from 25/5/2018 outside the Picasso Museum

Museu Picasso, Sala Ciutat, Museu de Disseny, Arxiu Historic, Fabra I Coats, Museu de la Musica, Fundacio Tapies, Fundacio Miro and CCCB were on strike on 27 March, 3 April and 5 April, after which the strikes continued indefinitely.

== Union demands ==
The Union demands included that the companies offer all employees permanent or fixed-term contracts, eliminate compulsory overtime, compensate for bank holidays worked, ensure equal salaries across the centers, provide suitable uniforms and shoes and allow time for breaks.

Talks between the union and the companies are mediated by the Departamento de Treball de la Generalitat (Department of Labour of the Generalitat).
