= 2018 Oklahoma teachers' strike =

2018 strike in the United States

2018 Oklahoma teachers' Walkout
- Part of the 2018–19 education workers' strikes in the United States
- Date: April 2, 2018 – April 12, 2018
- Location: Oklahoma
- Caused by: Ongoing education cuts
- Goals: $10,000 salary raise for teachers; $1,250 salary raise for support staff
- Methods: Occupation; Demonstrations; Internet activism; Walkout
- Result: $6,000 salary raise for teachers; $1,250 salary raise for support staff; Increased public school funding through tobacco & other taxes

Parties
| Oklahoma Education Association | Government of Oklahoma |

Lead figures
| Alicia Priest | Mary Fallin |

The 2018 Oklahoma teachers' walkout began on April 2, 2018, with teachers across the state walking out to protest low pay, overcrowded classrooms, and tax cuts that resulted in lower state-wide education spending. It was the first such action in Oklahoma since 1990. The OEA declared an end to the walkout on April 12 after an agreement to increase salaries and state funding for education was reached. The call to end the walkout faced some objection from teachers and parents who did not believe that enough concessions were made by lawmakers.

Unlike the similar action in West Virginia, the walkout was not a "wildcat" strike, as it received endorsement from union leadership, albeit only after pressure from teachers. The protest occurred concurrently with similar protests in Arizona, Kentucky, North Carolina, and Colorado.

== Background ==
=== State of public education in Oklahoma ===
Since 2008, education spending per student in Oklahoma has fallen 28%. Due to the decrease in funding, twenty percent of schools run on four-day weeks, and many have eliminated art and language classes and shut down sports programs. Gains from last teachers' strike in Oklahoma, in 1990, which resulted in an agreement to lower class sizes, expand kindergarten programs, and increase teacher wages were later reversed due to budget cuts. The decline in funding and subsequent decline in the quality of public education has resulted in the expansion of charter schools in the state.

=== Plans for a walkout ===
In 2016, State Question 779 was placed on the ballot, but failed to gain enough votes. SQ 779 proposed a one cent increase in sales tax and was estimated to bring in $615 million for education funding (including educator pay raises) in its first year. Failure of SQ 779 left many educators frustrated. Support for a strike began to build in early March 2018, after another proposal (dubbed the "Step Up" plan) failed to pass the required 75% threshold for tax increases. The "Step Up" plan would have increased certain taxes and boosted teacher pay by $5,000. Both Democrats and Republicans voted for and against the bill. Some Democrats who voted "no" believed the plan did not go far enough to restore funding.

Plans for a strike beginning on April 2 were first floated in March. Organizers utilized Facebook groups in planning the strike. On April 2, schools throughout Oklahoma were scheduled to take standardized tests; preventing these tests from taking place could potentially jeopardize millions in federal funds allocated to Oklahoma. After the Oklahoma legislature passed a tax increase to fund teach pay raises with the required 75% in each body on Friday, March 30, a strike beginning on the 2nd was announced. Thus, even before the walkout, teachers won greater school funding and salary increases, funded in part by increases in the cigarette tax, motor fuel tax, and the gross production tax on petroleum.

== Walkout ==
The strike lasted from April 2 to April 12. Strike leaders had called for the introduction of a capital gains tax to avoid a regressive tax, but the terms were nevertheless accepted. The legislature passed no further tax increases after the walkout began.

=== Salary demands ===
Public school teacher salaries in Oklahoma prior to the strike were the third lowest in the United States (after South Dakota and Mississippi), resulting in some teachers and staffers working second or third jobs. An initial offer of a $6,000 wage increase, ratified by the governor, was rejected, as the initial demands were for a $10,000 raise for teachers and a $1250 raise for support staff.

== Reactions from state officials ==
Governor Mary Fallin likened teacher demands to "...teenager(s) wanting a better car". The quote was appropriated by teachers and used in chants during protests at the Oklahoma State Capitol.

State representative Kevin McDugle, a Republican, indicated he would not pass any bill or measure to increase education spending due to the protests undertaken by the teachers.

== Results ==
A survey in 2019 found that the pay raise obtained by the strike had lifted the State's teacher pay ranking to 34th in the nation, higher than the surrounding states of New Mexico, Kansas, Missouri and Arkansas, but still lower than Colorado or Texas.

Ten Republican representatives who were opposed to raising taxes to increase teacher salaries were up for re-election in 2018. Two, Scott McEachin and Chuck Strohm, were eliminated by other Republican nominees during the initial primary, while a further seven did not gain enough votes to win their primaries uncontested. These seven faced runoff elections in August 2018, and six lost.

== See also ==
- Education in Oklahoma
- 2018–19 education workers' strikes in the United States
