= Magistrate court (West Virginia) =

Non-lawyer small claims and petty crime courts

In West Virginia, magistrate courts are non-lawyer small claims and petty crime courts, established to replace the justice of the peace system in 1976. There are at least two magistrates in every county, and ten in the largest county, Kanawha. Magistrates have jurisdiction over civil cases in which the financial amount in dispute is less than ten thousand dollars. They hear misdemeanor cases and conduct preliminary examinations in felony cases. In criminal cases they issue and record affidavits, complaints, arrest warrants, and search warrants, as well as set bail and make decisions concerning proposed plea agreements, the collection of courts costs, cash bonds, and fines. Magistrates issue emergency protective orders in cases involving domestic violence.

Magistrates were previously elected in partisan elections for four year terms in a form of "jungle election" with voters voting for whatever number of magistrates their county had in a single election. In 2015 the Legislature provided that future elections will be held on a non-partisan basis and will be by numbered divisions, so that a separate vote-for-one election will be held for each magistrate. Unlike the Circuit Courts and justices of the Supreme Court of Appeals, where judges must be West Virginia licensed attorneys for at least five years before running, magistrates only require a high school diploma and are not required to be licensed attorneys. Although there is nothing preventing a lawyer from running for the office and they have occasionally been elected, most magistrates in West Virginia are, in fact, not attorneys.
