= VCUarts adjunct workers' protests =

- Part of the 2018 teachers' strikes in the United States
- Date: December 4, 2017 – May 10, 2018
- Location: Virginia Commonwealth University
- Caused by: Long hours; Low pay; No health benefits; No tenure track
- Goals: Increase in pay from $800 per credit hour to $2,000 per credit hour
- Methods: Occupation; Demonstrations; Internet activism
- Result: Increase in pay from $800 per credit hour to $1,000 per credit hour

Parties
IWW Richmond; VCUarts Adjuncts Organizing for Fair Pay; VCU Adjunct Professors; VCU School of the Arts; VCU students	VCU Board of Visitors

Lead figures
Shawn Brixey	Michael Rao

Number
200 adjuncts	15 supervisors

The VCUarts adjunct workers' protests were a series of protests in late 2017 into early 2018 by adjunct professors employed by Virginia Commonwealth University, VCU full-time, tenured professors, and VCU students protesting over low pay, lack of benefits, and long working hours.

== Background ==
The VCU School of the Arts is the art school for Virginia Commonwealth University, a public-research university located in Richmond, Virginia. The School of the Arts, branded as VCUarts, is a nationally recognized art program, which employs around 400 professors on its academic staff. Approximately 202 of these teachers in VCUarts are adjunct professors, who are contractual professors who are paid by credit hour and do not receive employee benefits.

Most adjunct professors at VCU, including the School of the Arts are paid about $800 per credit hour they teach, and are limited to two or three classes they can teach per semester. This ultimately leaves them earning a potential annual salary of approximately $15,000, which is just above the federal poverty line. According to a report from Style Weekly, most VCUarts adjuncts make about $10,000 per year, which ranks last of the Top-10 art schools from U.S. News & World Report. In the fall of 2017, adjunct professors began organizing and formed a coalition known as "VCU Adjuncts for Fair Pay".

In December 2017 and again in February 2018 the group protested the lack of pay, and protested in the propose raise in adjunct pay from $800 to $1,000 per credit hour, demanding that it is raised to $2,000 per credit hour. Such a raise would allow a full-time adjunct professor to earn close to $36,000 per year. The group further attacked Michael Rao and his administration for having nearly $1 billion in endowment and used monies to purchase a night club off the VCU Campus.

== Reactions ==
=== VCU administration ===
VCU's Vice President for Finance and Budget Karol Kain Gray said in response that the low pay for adjunct faculty was becoming a morale issue. The Board of Visitors approved a budget for the 2018-19 school year that increased adjunct pay from $800 per credit hour to $1,000 per credit hour, which was about $1,000 less than what the VCU Adjuncts Organizing For Fair Pay demanded.

=== VCU students ===
The reception from students, especially art students, was positive. Most of the people in the protests were reported to be students in the VCUarts program.
