= 2018 West Virginia teachers' strike =

Labor dispute in West Virginia, United States

2018 West Virginia teachers and service personnel strike
- Part of the 2018–19 education workers' strikes in the United States
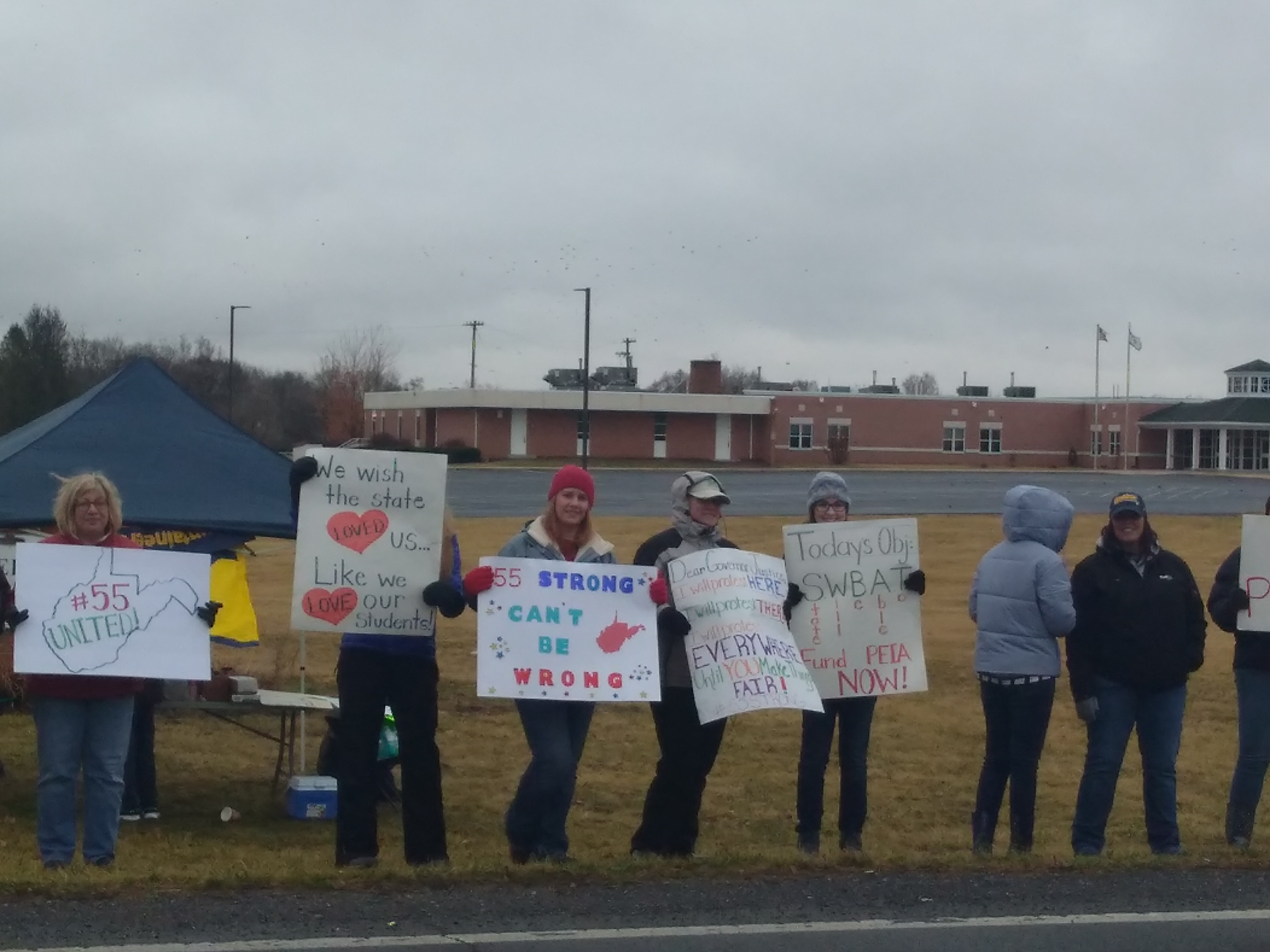
- WV Teacher Strike at Bunker Hill Elementary School in Berkeley County, West Virginia.
- Date: February 23, 2018 – March 7, 2018
- Location: West Virginia
- Methods: Occupation; Demonstrations; Internet activism; Walkout
- Result: 5% pay raise for all state employees in West Virginia

Parties
American Federation of Teachers; National Education Association	West Virginia Senate; West Virginia House of Delegates

Lead figures
Christine Campbell	Jim Justice

The West Virginia teachers' and school personnel strike began on February 22, 2018, with a call from the West Virginia branches of the American Federation of Teachers and the National Education Association, and the West Virginia School Service Personnel for school employees across West Virginia to strike. The strike, called in response to anger among teachers and other school employees over low pay and high health care costs, involved roughly 20,000 teachers and public school employees and shut down schools in all 55 West Virginia counties, affecting some 250,000 students. It lasted until March 7, 2018.

The strike inspired teachers in other states, including Oklahoma, Colorado, and Arizona, to take similar action. Teachers in other states, including North Carolina and Kentucky have also coordinated protests and walkouts on a smaller scale.

== Salary demands ==
The strike was called in response to the low pay of West Virginia teachers, whose compensation ranks 48th in the United States. The strike also responded to a pay raise passed by the legislature and signed by Governor Jim Justice that provided only a 2% raise for 2019, and 1% raise for 2020 and a 1% raise for 2021 and a freeze on premiums for 16 months to benefits. The teachers' unions did not release vote totals for the strike. Every public school district in the state closed to avoid confrontations. It was the first such strike since 1990. According to some analysts, West Virginia teachers had a stronger negotiating position in the strike because many teaching positions remain unfilled. Teachers say that because of low pay in West Virginia, the state has difficulty attracting and retaining teachers.

== Health insurance costs ==
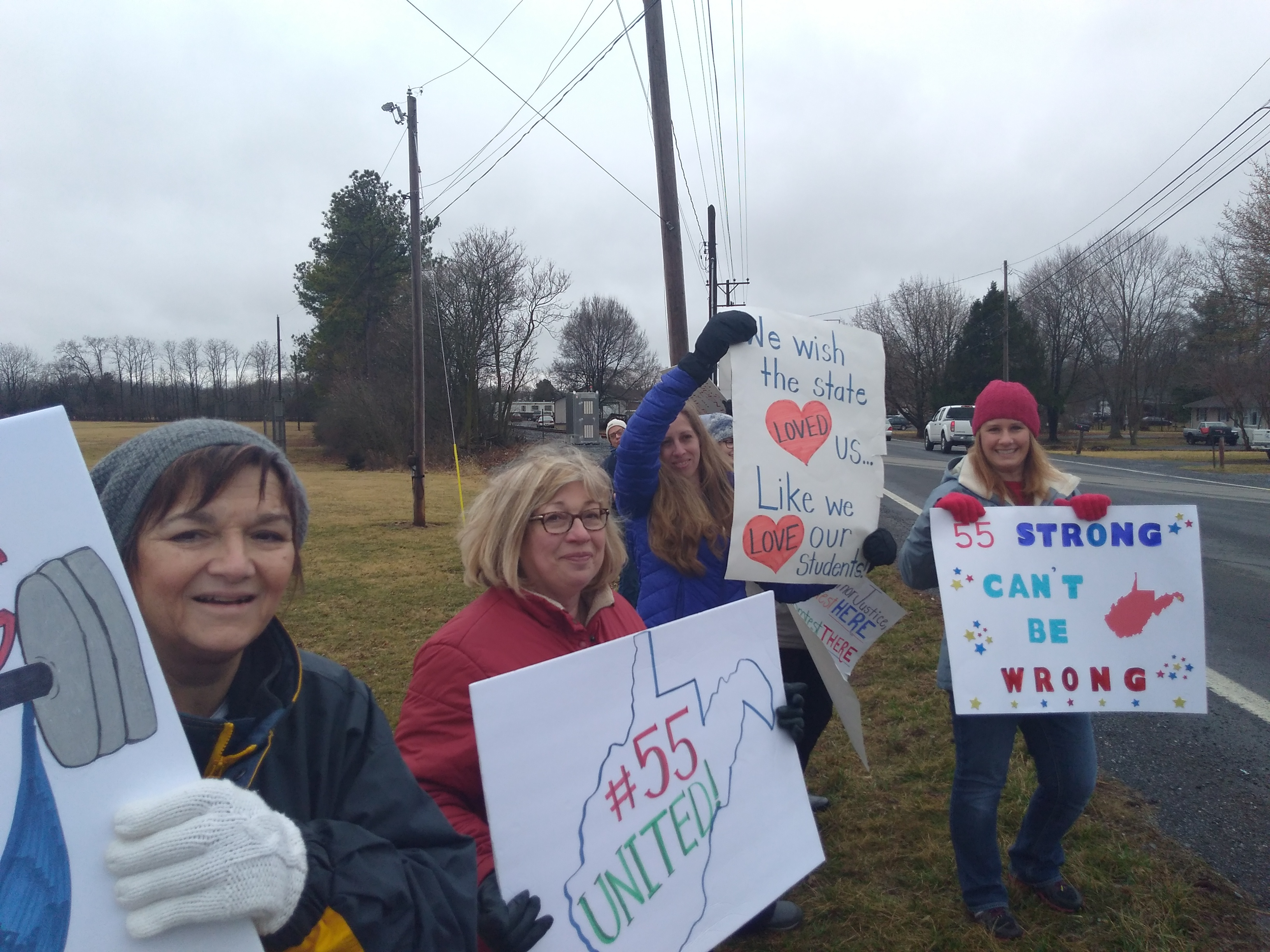
WV Teacher Strike at Bunker Hill Elementary School in Berkeley County, West Virginia

One of the major issues involved funding for the Public Employees Insurance Agency, the state health insurance plan. The West Virginia Legislature had voted to boost state contributions to the plan by using a percentage of the annual state surplus, but the teachers' unions were demanding a more reliable financing plan. Health care costs have increased quickly enough that proposed teacher pay increases cannot match teacher payments for health care.

== Strike and negotiations ==
The work stoppage took place in defiance of both state law forbidding public employee strikes and union leadership. On February 21, the day before the walkout, state Attorney General Patrick Morrisey warned that a strike "of any length on any ground is illegal" and said his office would support local districts attempting to enforce the state ban on public employee strikes. Nonetheless, on the same day, Governor Justice signed into law a bill offering teachers a 2% pay increase. "We need to keep our kids and teachers in the classroom," Gov. Justice said in signing the law. "We certainly recognize our teachers are underpaid and this is a step in the right direction to addressing their pay issue." Teachers said that the 2% pay raise, and subsequent raises of 1% slated for 2020 and 2021, would not keep up with inflation.

Teachers rejected the pay raise, walking out across the state on February 22. The same day, a crowd estimated at 5,000 demonstrated at the West Virginia State Capitol.

The strike continued on February 23, as all schools in the state were closed once again. Teachers and other workers rallied in front of the West Virginia State Capitol as well as picketed in front of individual schools. West Virginia teachers have a stronger negotiating position in the strike because many teaching positions remain unfilled.

A deal reached by union leaders and Governor Jim Justice was announced on February 27, and union leaders called on teachers and other education-related personnel to return to classrooms on Thursday March 1, after a "cooling off" period. However, during the late evening on February 28, every county announced school closures due to continuing work stoppages, and by this point the stoppage had become a wildcat strike. On March 3, the West Virginia Senate rejected a bill passed by the West Virginia House of Delegates approving the agreed upon 5% pay rise, instead proposing a 4% pay rise, extending the strike into an eighth work day.

A similar strike was proposed by teachers in Oklahoma, where teacher compensation is worse than in West Virginia, at 49th in the United States. On Sunday March 4, 1,400 West Virginia Frontier Communications workers went on strike in response to company restructuring, also citing rising health care costs, and the example of the Teacher's Strike.

West Virginia school personnel returned to classrooms on Wednesday March 7 after the State Senate agreed to the House's position following conference committee negotiations. The strike, while achieving a 5% pay raise, did not provide guarantees to control rising health care costs.

== Reactions ==
Justice and other Republican lawmakers opposed the strike and asserted that the teachers' absence from the classroom were hurting school children. He also said there was not enough money to fund teachers' demands. "I'm telling you when we should do more is when we know we can do more," Justice said on February 23. "Today we think we can do more, but we don't know. Our teachers need to be in the classroom. The Legislature has spoken and I've signed it into law." Justice, a billionaire coal magnate, won election in 2016 as a Democrat with the endorsements of the AFT-WV and the WVEA, along with other unions in the state. He subsequently switched to the Republican Party.

Union officials sought backing from prominent state Democratic Party leaders, inviting them to speak at teachers' demonstrations during the strike.

The strike was noteworthy because it emerged from rank-and-file teachers, who began to demand statewide strike action. Pressure to strike was "coming from everywhere," Christine Campbell, AFT-WV president, said in early February. These demands coalesced into a series of rallies and demonstrations held throughout the state. Ultimately the strike became a wildcat when teachers refused back-to-work orders from the unions.

The Industrial Workers of the World (IWW) issued a press release, demanding that the strike continue unless a series of demands were met, including a tax on natural gas production to fund state education. A number of IWW members (Wobblies) were key contributors to the effort, including as building representatives.

== See also ==
- Education in West Virginia
- 2012 Chicago Teachers Strike
- Hayward teachers strike
- 2018–19 education workers' strikes in the United States
