= 2018 Colorado teachers' strike =

Colorado teachers' withdrawal of labor, 2018

- Part of the 2018–19 education workers' strikes in the United States
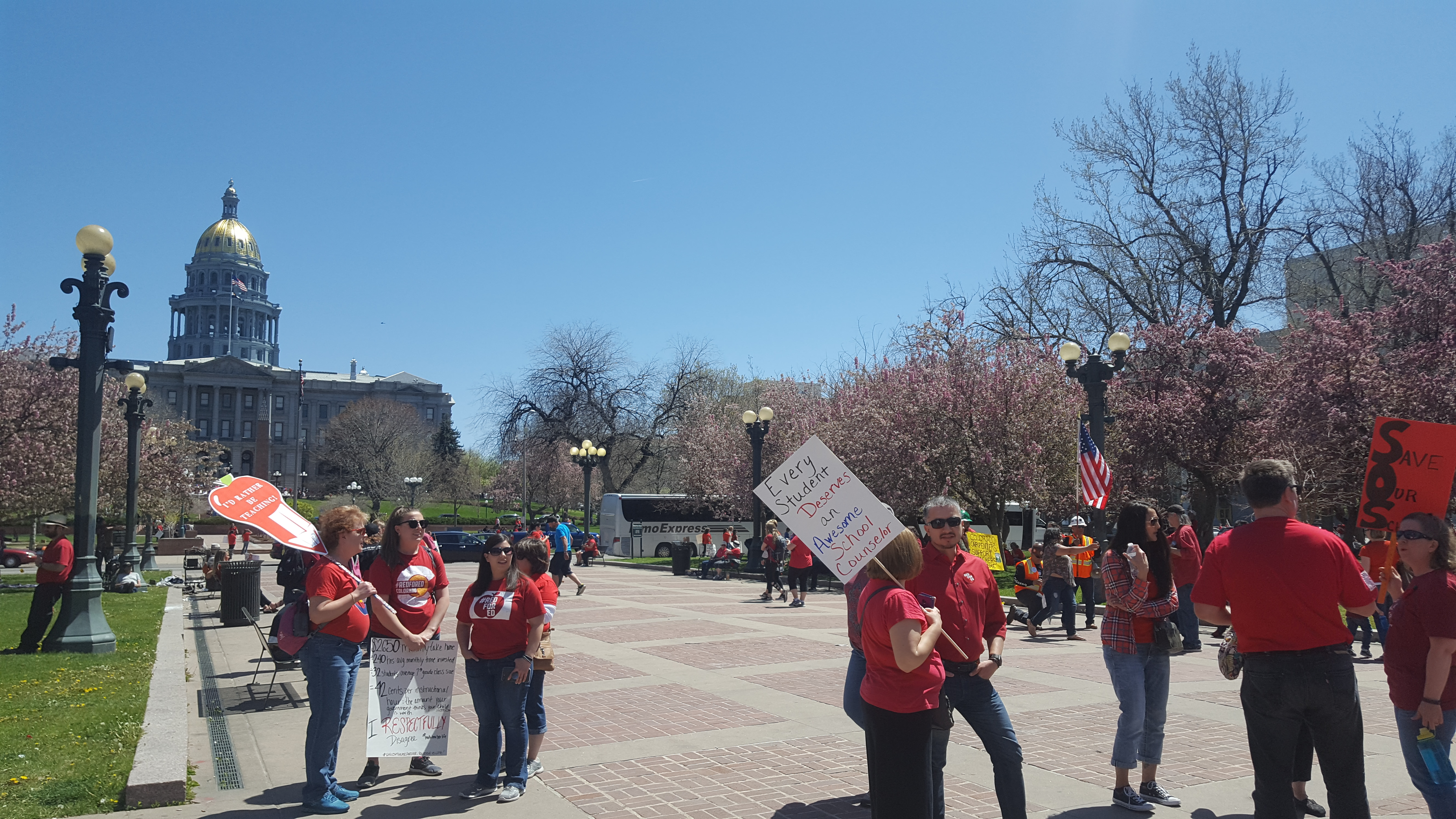
- Scene from the April 27 rally in Denver.
- Date: April 27, 2018–May 12, 2018
- Location: Colorado
- Caused by: Ongoing education cuts; Lack of pension plan funding; Low salaries
- Methods: Occupation; Demonstrations; Internet activism; Walkout
- Result: 2 percent pay raise

Parties
Colorado Education Association	Government of Colorado

Lead figures
Amie Baca-Oehlert; Kerrie Dallman; Lawrence Garcia; Kevin LaDuke; Ami Prichard; Brad Bartels	John Hickenlooper; Donna Lynne; Cynthia Coffman; Wayne W. Williams; Walker Stapleton

The 2018 Colorado teachers' strike was a two and a half week strike that began on April 27, 2018, with teachers in some districts across the state walking out to protest low pay, low state-wide education spending, and mismanagement of the state teachers' pension. The strike ended on May 12, 2018 with an agreement between the teachers' union and school officials for a 2 percent pay raise. The strike was part of the larger wave of teachers' strikes in the United States where protests occurred in West Virginia, Oklahoma and Arizona.

== Background ==
=== State of public education in Colorado ===
The Colorado Education Association says that teacher salaries after inflation have dropped 17 percent in the last 15 years, and that the state has underfunded education by $6.6 billion since 2009 by failing to implement a constitutional amendment that requires education funding to grow on pace with inflation.

=== Pension costs ===
One of the largest reasons for decreasing teacher pay and less funding for schools is the large amount of money diverted from current budgets to pay educators' unfunded pension liabilities. For example: "In Colorado, school district payments to the public pension fund have roughly doubled since 2006, from about 10 percent of payroll to 20 percent."

A 2016 study found that only 30% of the money that school districts pay towards the retirement benefits of an educator actually go toward that educator's pension, with 70% being used to pay off unfunded debt in that pension system. "The disparity is about twice as stark in Colorado. Just $3 of every $20 spent per teacher goes to their retirement, according to an analysis by the state retirement system."

== Strike ==
The strike began on April 27. On that day, 10 school districts were closed in the state due to the strike.

The topic of educational funding in various states within the United States has become a controversial subject. In early 2018, teachers in the states of Arizona, Colorado, North Carolina, Oklahoma, and West Virginia conducted strikes. In Colorado, the strikes occurred because of low teacher salaries and insignificant benefits. Colorado teachers were represented by the Colorado Education Association (CEA) and were opposed by officials of state government. The CEA demanded a two percent salary increase and a significant favorable adjustment to the Colorado Public Employees’ Retirement Association (PERA). In response, on April 20, 2018, Colorado Senator Bob Gardner and Representative Paul Lundeen introduced Senate Bill 18-264. Gardner and Lundeen intended to discourage teachers from conducting protests. “The bill prohibits public school teachers and teacher organizations from directly or indirectly inducing, instigating, encouraging, authorizing, ratifying, or participating in a strike against any public-school employer” (SB18-264, n.d.). However, Senate Bill 18-264 was heavily criticized and was dismissed. Despite the threat of the bill, Colorado teachers began to strike on April 27, 2018 and continued to do so until May 12, 2018. Ultimately, the state government of Colorado agreed to give teachers a two percent salary increase.

== Reactions from state officials ==
Two Republican state senators, Bob Gardner and Paul Lundeen responded by proposing a bill that would fine teachers $5,000 per day for striking and send to teachers to jail for six months for striking. The bill was met with harsh criticism and was killed in subcommittee on April 30, although Gardner indicated he would consider reintroducing the bill in 2019 should there be a strike.

On April 30, Democratic governor, John Hickenlooper signed a $28.9 billion budget into law. In the law, $225 million was allocated to the state pension, and increased K-12 education funding by $150 million annually. Additionally, public colleges and universities would receive a 9 percent increase in state funding aimed at limiting increases in tuition rates.

== See also ==
- Education in Colorado
- 2018–19 education workers' strikes in the United States
