= 2018 Arizona teachers' strike =

2018 strike in the United States

2018 Arizona teachers' walkout
- Part of the 2018–19 education workers' strikes in the United States
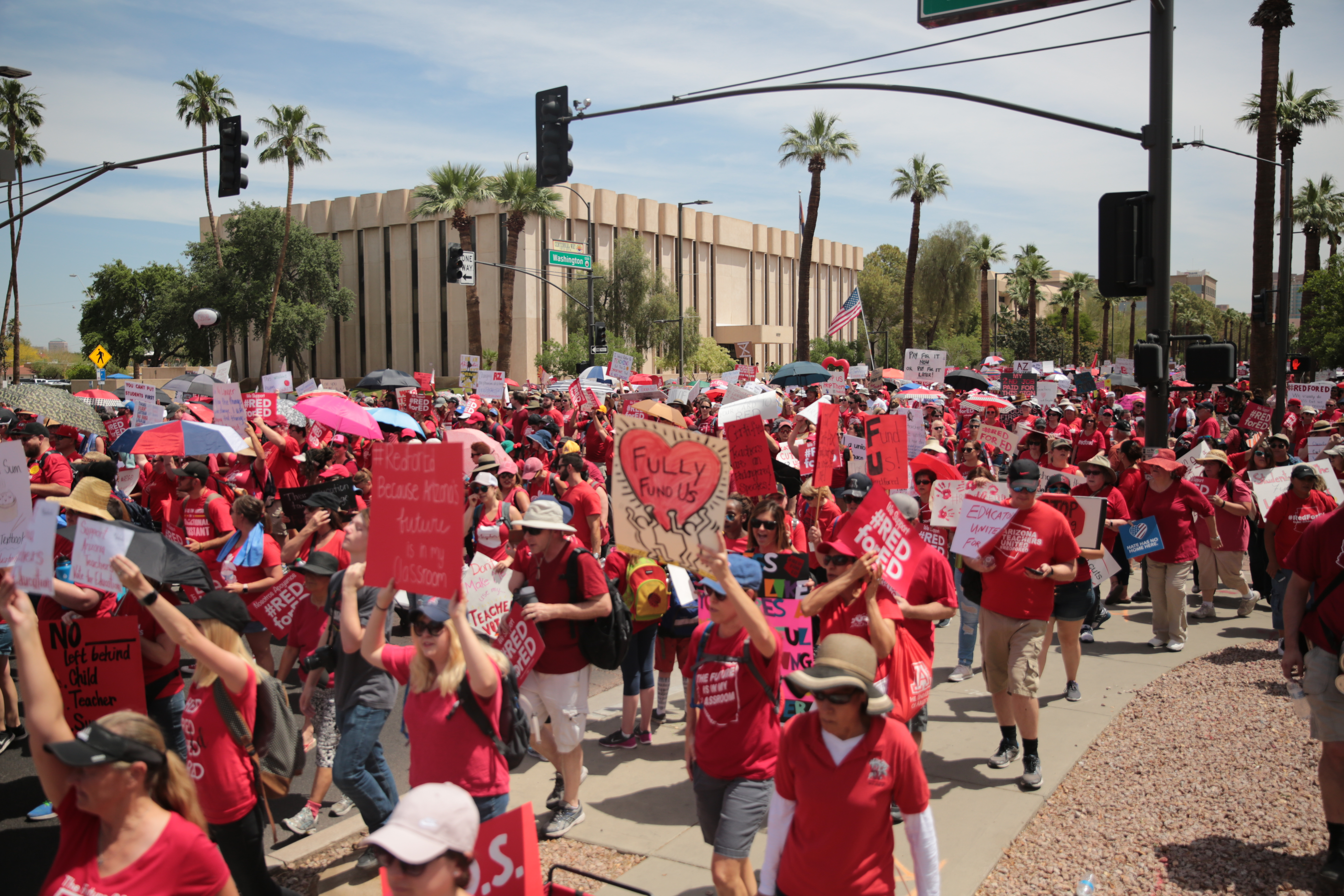
- Teachers rally on Washington Street in Phoenix
- Date: April 26, 2018 – May 3, 2018
- Location: Arizona
- Caused by: Ongoing education cuts since the Great Recession
- Goals: 20% salary raise for teachers by 2020; Decrease of the student:teacher ratio to 23:1
- Methods: Occupation; Demonstrations; Internet activism; Walkout
- Result: 20% salary raise for teachers by 2020; 9% raise for teachers in 2018–19 school year; subsequent 5% raises for the next two years; Increased support staff salaries

Parties
Arizona Education Association & Arizona Educators United	Government of Arizona

Lead figures
Joe Thomas; Marisol Garcia; Noah Karvelis; Kelley Fisher; Rebecca Garelli; Derek Harris; Dylan Wegela; Wes Oswald; Vanessa Arredondo	Doug Ducey; Michele Reagan; J. D. Mesnard; TJ Shope; John Allen; Kelly Townsend; Rebecca Rios; Steve Yarbrough; John Kavanagh; Kimberly Yee; Katie Hobbs

Number
70,000 educators	

The 2018 Arizona teachers' strike was held from April 26–May 3, 2018, by 20,000 teachers to protest low pay and cuts to school funding. Arizona Governor Doug Ducey had approved a proposal giving a 20 percent raise to teachers by 2020, with a 9 percent raise in 2019; teachers rejected this proposal as it did not provide increased funding for schools themselves or raises for support staff. It coincided with a similar strike in neighboring Colorado.

The walkout occurred after similar actions in West Virginia and Oklahoma, and was the third in a wave of teachers' strikes in the United States. It was the first such action by teachers in Arizona.

The strike ended on May 3, 2018, when the Government of Arizona conceded to increase funding to increase salaries for support staff and to decrease student to counselor ratios.

== Background ==
Teachers began holding "walk-ins" the week of April 9, during which they protested in favor of increased funding while on school campuses, and discussed the reasons for the protests with parents and interested parties. Teachers also wore red to school to indicate solidarity. These protests were organized by Arizona Educators United, and were planned in part on social media.

Arizona lawmakers originally offered teachers a 1 percent raise in 2018, with an additional 1 percent raise in 2019. Doug Ducey, the Arizona governor, further indicated that demands for a 20 percent raise were unlikely to be satisfied, and that there would be no increase in taxes to increase education spending.

Contradicting his earlier statements, Ducey announced on April 13 that there would be a 20 percent raise for teachers in the form of a 10 percent raise in 2019 and a 10 percent raise in 2020, and that $1 billion in funding cut over the past decade would be restored. When announced, Ducey did not discuss how the increases would be funded. The announcement was met with skepticism from labor organizers.

=== State of education funding in Arizona ===
Before the walkout, teachers' salaries in 2018 were between $8000 and $9000 lower than teachers' salaries in 1990, when adjusted for inflation. Wages for teachers in Arizona were some of the lowest in the United States, averaging $48,372 per year at the time. In 2017, Arizona ranked last of all fifty states for average elementary school pay, and second to last for teacher pay at the secondary level. Since the Great Recession, funding in the state had been cut by 14 percent. Cuts had been further exacerbated by the privatization trend in the state, which had led to job insecurity.

== Walkout ==
Teachers voted on April 19 to begin a walkout on April 26. Of the 57,000 individuals who voted, 78 percent were in favor of a walkout. The decision to walk out was in part precipitated by an unstable plan to fund governor Ducey's proposal from earlier in April, which would have created a $265 million deficit after its rollout. During the walkout, teachers organized various events, both to discuss their motivations with the public and to guarantee students reliant on subsidized meals still received food.

On May 1, teachers agreed to end the walkout if Arizona lawmakers passed a new budget with both raises and increased spending on schools. The strike officially ended after the budget was passed on May 3.

=== Demands ===
AEU demands include a 20 percent raise for all teachers and staff during the 2018–2019 school year, the return of funding to pre-Recession levels, and a decrease in class size to a student to teacher ratio of 23:1.

=== Responses from state officials ===
Democratic legislators in the Arizona House endorsed the planned walkout. Rebecca Rios referred to it as "brave and righteous". Governor Ducey, on Twitter, condemned the results of the vote, expressing fears that students would be "...the ones who lose out..." if the walkout occurred.
