= Walkout =

Form of protest

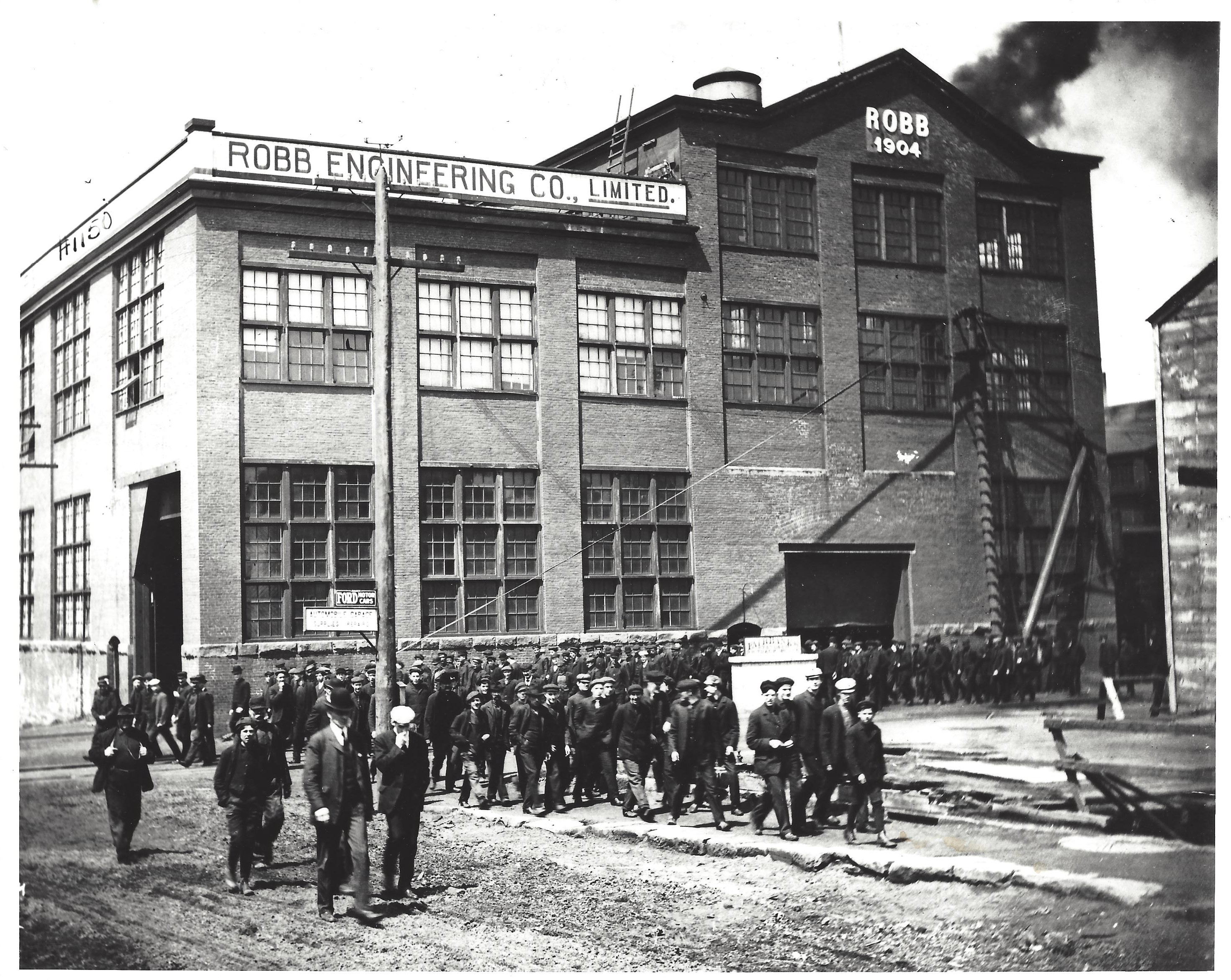
Workers walk off the job during the Amherst general strike on May 19th 1919.

In labor disputes, a walkout is a labor strike, the act of employees collectively leaving the workplace and withholding labor as an act of protest.

A walkout can also mean the act of leaving a place of work, school, a meeting, a company, or an organization, especially if meant as an expression of protest or disapproval.

A walkout can be seen as different from a strike in that a walkout can occur spontaneously, and need not necessarily involve all the workers present, whereas a strike is often voted on beforehand by the workers, giving notification both to all of the workers and to the company affected.

Walkouts have often been staged against the presence of a speaker or the content of an in-progress speech at a meeting. The protest, which is often a silent, non-violent means of expressing disapproval, is often interpreted as an exercise of the freedom of association while allowing the speaker to exercise the freedom of speech, albeit with a reduced audience in attendance.

== Notable walkouts ==
=== 1968 East Los Angeles ===
These were a series of 1968 protests against unequal conditions in Los Angeles Unified School District high schools, beginning on March 6.

=== 2018 Google walkouts ===
The 2018 Google walkouts were a series of employee walkouts that occurred across Google offices on November 1, 2018.

=== 2021 Netflix walkout ===
The 2021 Netflix walkout was a labor dispute involving a number of workers at American streaming and production company Netflix in late 2021.

=== The National School Walkout ===
The National School Walkout was a national student-led protest on April 20, 2018, the 19th anniversary of the Columbine High School massacre.

=== 1986 COMELEC walkout ===
On 9 February 1986, a group of computer technicians walked out from their jobs at the tabulation center of the presidential election called by President Ferdinand Marcos, claiming they observed major anomalies in the election results being reported to the public.

== See also ==
- Strike action
- Lockout
- Boycott
