= Graduate student employee unionization =

Labor unions representing university-employed students

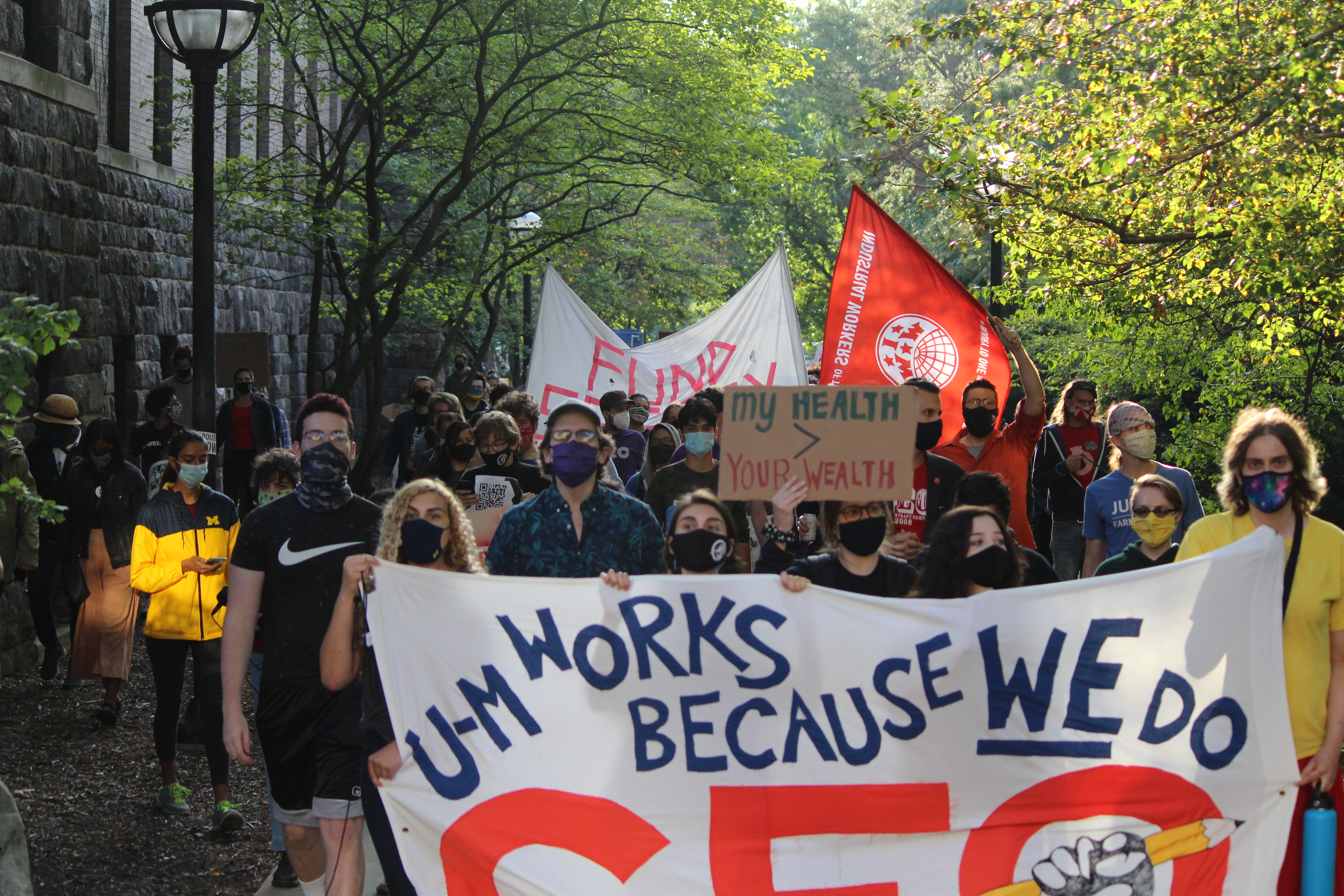
A 2020 strike by the Graduate Employees' Organization 3550 at the University of Michigan

Graduate student employee unionization, or academic student employee unionization, (Note: Many of these unions refer to their workers as Academic Student Employees (ASEs) to reflect the fact that their membership may also include undergraduate students working in represented job classifications.) is the formation of labor unions that represent students who are employed by their college or university to teach classes, conduct research and perform clerical duties. As of 2014, there were at least 33 US graduate employee unions, 18 unrecognized unions in the United States, and 23 graduate employee unions in Canada. By 2019, approximately 83,050 unionized student employees belonged to certified bargaining units in the United States. As of 2023, there were at least 156 US graduate student employee unions and 23 graduate student employee unions in Canada.

In Finland and Sweden, graduate students are often regular employees and are represented by their respective professional unions, such as member unions of Akava in Finland.

Labor laws in the United States and Canada permit collective bargaining for only limited classes of student-employees. In the US, public and private institutions have different authorities governing collective bargaining rights. In public universities, state labor laws determine collective bargaining and employee recognition. In private universities, the National Labor Relations Board (NLRB) has power to determine whether graduate students are considered employees, which would give them collective bargaining rights. Prior to the 2000s, almost all US graduate employee unions were in public universities, most of which formed during the 1990s. In 2014, New York University's Graduate Student Organizing Committee, affiliated with the United Automobile Workers (UAW), became the first graduate employee union recognized by a private university in the US. The NLRB ruled that graduate students at private universities are employees in a 3–1 decision on August 23, 2016, setting the stage for widespread unionization efforts. In September 2018, Brandeis University became the second private university to negotiate a collective bargaining agreement for graduate student employees, followed by Tufts University in October 2018 and Harvard in July 2020. American University and New School were in the process of negotiating an agreement as of September 2018. In 2019, the NLRB proposed a new rule that said graduate students are not employees, which would affect unionization efforts at private universities, and in 2021, withdrew the proposed rule.

In the US, many faculty associations like the American Association of University Professors (AAUP) support the right of graduate students to form unions, supported by research that suggests that unionization neither threatens academic freedom of institutions nor harms the relationship between faculty and students. Nonetheless, many university administrators and university associations like the Association of American Universities insist otherwise and have vigorously opposed unionization of graduate student employees on their campuses through legal challenges.

== United States ==
The main issue over graduate student employee unionization in the United States is whether academic student employees should be classified as employees or students. The recognition of employee status would give graduate students the right to form a union and to bargain collectively. The position of many universities is that the work graduate student employees do is so intertwined with their professional education that collective bargaining will harm the educational process. Supporters of unionization argue that graduate employees' work is primarily an economic relationship. They point especially to universities' use of Teaching Assistants as part of a wider trend away from full-time, tenured faculty.

For tax purposes, the Internal Revenue Service considers the compensation of graduate student employees to be wages. When graduate students receive payment for teaching, it is not taxed on a 1042-S form (for scholarships), but on a W-2 (which is the form for employment income). The income from teaching is taxed differently from scholarships and treated like employment income.

=== Public universities ===
Academic student employees who may be either graduate or undergraduate students at public colleges and universities in the United States are covered by state collective bargaining laws, where these laws exist. Graduate students employees are excluded from Federal bargaining rights under the Taft–Hartley Act's exclusion of state and local government employees.

The various state laws differ on which subgroups of academic student employees may bargain collectively, and a few state laws explicitly exclude them from bargaining. Some states have extended collective bargaining rights to graduate employees in response to unionization campaigns. As of 2004, 14 states including California and New York explicitly give collective bargaining rights to academic student employees; 11 states like Connecticut and New Mexico give public university employees the right to collectively bargain, but leaves eligibility for graduate employees unstated; Ohio excludes collective bargaining rights for graduate student employees while still providing the same rights to other university employees; and 23 states deny collective bargaining rights for all university employees.

=== Private universities ===
Graduate student employees at private colleges and universities in the United States are covered by the National Labor Relations Act (NLRA). Initially, the National Labor Relations Board (NLRB) rejected all private university employees including academic employees from being protected by the NLRA. In the Trustees of Columbia (1951) decision, the NLRB held that the act did not have jurisdiction in private universities because universities focus primarily on education and are not associated with significant commercial activity. However, two decades later in Cornell v NLRB (1970), the NLRB reversed Columbia, holding that due to changing economic realities and difficulties in distinguishing between commercial and noncommercial activities in private universities, the NLRA covers employees in private education institutions.

For the employee status of academic student employees, the NLRB's rulings have shifted in recent decades. In these decisions, the NLRB has grappled with two main conflicting legal arguments. The "primary purpose" approach holds that graduate students are not employees because the primary purpose of graduate students is to fulfill the role of a student rather than that of an employee. In contrast, the "compensated services" approach holds that graduate students are employees because they perform services for others and have distinct manager-worker relations with university administrators.

The "primary purpose" doctrine was first applied to graduate students in Adelphi University and Adelphi University Chapter, American Association of University Professors (1972) (Adelphi University) decision, in which the NLRB rejected graduate teaching and research assistants from collectively bargaining with faculty.

After years of rejecting employee status to graduate students, the NLRB overturned the Adelphi University (1972) decision. Under New York University and International Union, United Automobile Aerospace and Agricultural Implement Workers of America, AFL–CIO (2000) (NYU), the NLRB applied the "compensated services" legal approach, ruling for the first time that graduate students at private universities were considered employees, and hence protected by the NLRA. However, the NLRB later returned to its "primary purpose" approach in 2004 after a new Republican-appointed majority reversed NYU. In Brown University and International Union, United Automobile, Aerospace and Agricultural Implement Workers of America, UAW AFL–CIO (2004) (Brown University), the NLRB's 3–2 majority ruled that graduate students in private universities are not considered employees.

In recent years, NYU's graduate student union filed a case seeking to overturn Brown University, which in 2012 the NLRB announced that it would reconsider. However, NYU's graduate student union later agreed to withdraw its NLRB petition in return for union recognition by the private university. On December 17, 2014, graduate student unions affiliated with UAW at both Columbia University and The New School have filed petitions at the NLRB to overturn the Brown decision.

Following the NLRB's 2016 Columbia University decision, student unionization in certified bargaining units grew by 14,820 members. Much of this growth was due to ten newly certified student employee unions at private universities, following NLRB elections at Harvard and the New School, as well as voluntary recognitions of graduate employee unions at Georgetown University and Brown University.

== History ==
=== Beginnings (1960s–1979) ===
Graduate student unionization began mostly in the late 1960s, influenced heavily by the New Left Movement and the UC Berkeley Free Speech Movement. The two movements sparked discussions on university democracy and students' relationship with the university. Throughout this period, only public university graduate students were able to form recognized unions. Although graduate students in private colleges were active in union organizing campaigns, they were greatly restricted by the Columbia (1951) and later Adelphi University (1972) decisions, which both barred the NLRA from protecting graduate students in private universities. The board ruled that graduate assistants were not employees since their relationship is primarily for learning purposes.

Teaching assistants at Rutgers University and the City University of New York (CUNY) were the first to be included under a collective bargaining agreement. Rutgers and CUNY included graduate assistants with the faculty unionization contract. The University of Wisconsin–Madison's Teaching Assistants Association was the first to be recognized as an independent employee bargaining unit in 1969 and was granted a contract in 1970. At the same time, graduate assistants at the University of Michigan organized a union, which later won a contract in 1975. The next to unionize was the University of Oregon and three Florida universities: University of Florida, Florida A&M, and the University of South Florida. Florida was the first state to unionize where the union membership density in the state was below 15 percent.

=== Decline and inactivity (1980–1989) ===
Between 1981 and 1991, few universities recognized a graduate union—the quietest period of unionization. An exception was the University of Massachusetts Amherst, where 2,500 graduate assistants won recognition in November 1990 and a contract the following year covering teaching, research, and project assistants, and assistant residence directors. Teaching assistants at the University at Buffalo began a union campaign in 1975, but withdrew their petition to the State of New York Public Employee Relations Board (PERB). Other campuses from the State of New York University System, such as Albany, Binghamton, and Stony Brook, revived the union petition in 1984. Similarly, teaching assistants at the University of California at Berkeley started a union campaign in 1983. Eventually in 1993, exam readers and tutors, but not graduate assistants, were given collective bargaining rights at Berkeley. Full collective bargaining status to all teaching assistants was not given until 1999.

=== Aggressive growth (1990–2004) ===
The 1990s brought about more aggressive and successful union drives in both public and private universities, which culminated in the NLRB's NYU (2000) decision, granting employee status and collective bargaining rights to private university graduate students. The number of unionized graduate employees nearly tripled from 14,060 unionized graduate students in 1990 to 38,750 graduate students in 2001.

Labor unions began more active efforts in providing support and resources for student unionization drives. The new 1995 leadership of the AFL–CIO created a summer program in 1996 to train student union organizers and reached out to students by sending its Organizing Institute recruiters onto college campuses. Additionally, national attention turned towards academic labor and unionization efforts. Journalist Scott Smallwood announced 2001 to be the "Year of the TA" following unionization victories in New York University, Temple University, and Michigan State University. Like the previous decades, the vast majority of graduate employee unions formed were from public universities. Despite aggressive unionizing drives in private universities like Yale, only NYU's graduate students obtained union recognition following the NYU decision.

In 1991, the University of Wisconsin–Milwaukee won recognition for a graduate-student union. Shortly thereafter, the University of Albany, Buffalo, Binghamton, and Stony Brook won recognition when the State of New York PERB ruled teaching assistants were employees and were granted collective bargaining rights. Several other public universities also won recognition in the 1990s. In 1995, the University of Kansas GTA union won their election, and signed their first union contract in 1997. Teaching and research assistants at the University of Massachusetts, Lowell and the University of Iowa approved a union contract in 1996. Wayne State University also negotiated a contract with teaching assistants in 1999. Besides SUNY, the University of California system was the second university system to unionize. In 1999, the California PERB ruled teaching assistants were allowed to collectively bargain with the University of California. Union elections were held at the University of California's Berkeley, Davis, Los Angeles, Santa Cruz, Santa Barbara, Riverside, and Irvine campuses—all of them approving a teaching assistant union. In 2000, union negotiations for all of the campuses were combined into UAW Local 2865, who bargains on behalf of all the campuses. Teaching assistants at the University of California, Merced also joined the union when the campus opened in 2006.

Several notable unionization efforts arose at private universities. Although pre-NYU-rulings by the NLRB did not permit graduate students to unionize at private universities, they also did not prohibit universities from recognizing unions. Teaching assistant unions formed at Yale and New York University. To gain bargaining status, the unions went on several strikes and led long union drive campaigns.

Throughout the 1990s and early 2000s, Yale graduate students organized a sustained union drive campaign, which remains ongoing. In response to poor pay and working conditions, Yale's graduate students formed Teaching Assistant Solidarity in 1987, which later became the Graduate Employees and Students Organization (GESO) in 1990. Students orchestrated multiple strikes to gain union recognition. GESO orchestrated a one-day walkout in December 1991 and a three-day strike in February 1992. Additionally, Yale graduate students participated in a walkout on April 6, 1995, to demand union recognition. Despite a later 600–120 vote in favor of union representation, the university refused to negotiate a contract. In 1996, teaching assistants at Yale refused to calculate and submit fall semester grades. The administration still refused to recognize the union and the strike eventually ended. A suit was filed by the NLRB on behalf of the striking Yale students claiming Yale's administration violated unfair-labor-practice law; however, a judge later dismissed the suit. GESO participated in a five-day strike along with other unions in Yale University in March 2003 for better wages and pensions and demand for union recognition. However, in a union voting drive the following May, Yale graduate students rejected unionization by a narrow 694–651 margin.

In 2000, the National Labor Relations Board reversed their previous rulings on unionization at private universities and permitted graduate assistants at New York University (NYU) to unionize. Later that year, graduate assistants at NYU signed their first and only contract.

Since 2000, more than twenty campuses have unionized. In 2001, the University of Massachusetts Boston signed their first contract with teaching and research assistants while Oregon State University won a contract—the second to receive a contract in Oregon. In 2002, Michigan State University and Temple University unionized. Despite a state law explicitly denying graduate assistants from unionizing, the Washington PERB ruled graduate assistants at the University of Washington could unionize. The University of Rhode Island also unionized that year.

=== Brown era (2004–2016) ===
In 2004, the NLRB again reversed itself and prohibited Brown University and other private universities from unionizing. Unionization drives after 2004 are mostly characterized by a slowing of momentum in organizing activity, particularly in private universities. The NLRB's Brown decision in 2004 reversed the legal protections and collective bargaining rights that, under NYU, had covered graduate students in private universities. As a result, private university union drives have stalled in the courts in attempts to reverse the Brown decision. Graduate students in public universities, however, have continued to unionize.

A ruling by the Illinois Court of Appeals permitted the University of Illinois Urbana-Champaign (2002), University of Illinois Chicago (2004), and University of Illinois Springfield (2006) and Southern Illinois University at Carbondale (2006) to unionize. The large California State University system, the third university system, unionized in 2006. Also in 2006, Western Michigan University teaching assistants unionized—the fourth Michigan university to do so. Central Michigan University graduate assistants are developed a union and signed their first contract in 2010. In 2014, more than 2,100 graduate assistants at the University of Connecticut won union recognition following one of the fastest organizing campaigns in graduate student unionization history.

Following the NLRB's Brown (2004) decision, NYU refused to bargain with the NYU graduate union after the expiration of their contract in 2005. Despite a 2005–06 strike, NYU graduate student employees union were not able to obtain union recognition. In April 2010, more than 1,000 NYU graduate assistants again filed an election petition with the NLRB. NLRB Acting Regional 2 Director Elbert F. Tellem denied the petition, deferring to the NLRB's 2004 decision in Brown University. But in language highly critical of Brown, Tellem observed that "The instant record clearly shows that these graduate assistants are performing services under the control and direction of" New York University "for which they are compensated. It is also clear on the record that these services remain an integral component of graduate education." Tellem criticized Brown University for being "premised on a university setting as it existed 30 years ago", and said that "The graduates have a dual relationship with the employer which does not necessarily preclude a finding of employee status." The New York Times said the Region 2 decision "lays the groundwork to overturn the 2004 ruling," and other media outlets agreed. NYU graduate students later filed a petition to overturn Brown University, which the NLRB agreed to review in 2012. The case was withdrawn in 2013, however, in an agreement with the university to regain union recognition. Two new petitions seeking to overturn Brown University were filed at the NLRB by the graduate student unions of Columbia University and The New School on December 17, 2014.

Recently, the NLRB has ruled research assistants at private, but university-affiliated, research centers for SUNY and CUNY are permitted to unionize.

=== Post-Columbia era (2016–present) ===
On August 23, 2016, the NLRB reversed the 2004 Brown decision and ruled that student assistants are protected by the NLRA. Columbia was followed by a resurgence of graduate students calling for elections, with eight schools winning graduate union recognition votes since the decision. Unionization attempts since Columbia have been characterized by rapid establishment at the onset, followed by extensive internal challenges by the universities at which they are formed.

This reversal of Board case law has led to recent challenges within the administrations of higher-ed institutions. Nine universities, including Brown University, filed an amicus brief in 2016 in the challenge to the Columbia decision opposing graduate student unionization and the classification of graduate students as employees. In the brief, these universities argued that doing so would impinge on the academic freedoms of the university. University administrations have undertaken substantial measures to oppose unionization on their campuses.

== Causes of unionization ==
Academic student unionization is seen by some academics as a response to the growing corporatization of universities. Many graduate students and union officers actively critique privatization of the academy and point to privatization of the university as a major factor in choosing to unionize.

Unionization has also been attributed to increased teaching workloads and financial difficulties imposed on graduate students, as since the 1970s universities have transferred more instruction tasks from tenure track faculty to adjunct faculty and graduate students as cost saving measures. This is also in combination with the increased tuition and higher cost of living, the prospect of having to pay off an increasing loan debt, and poor job opportunities. Graduate students became more inclined to recognize themselves as employees, and turned towards unionization to better demand bread-and-butter issues such as increased stipends or wages and benefits such as health insurance and child care.

Additionally, increased labor union activity in academic sectors has played a key role in graduate employee unionization. During the sizable growth in the 1990s, graduate students were better able to access legal support, financial resources, and networking opportunities provided by the new leadership in the AFL–CIO and by unions such as UAW. The newly elected 1995 AFL–CIO leadership engaged college students by creating a Union Summer Internships program in 1996 to train students in union organizing. The AFL–CIO also sent Organizing Institute recruiters onto college campuses to build pro-labor solidarity networks and share information with student organizers about other universities' organizing efforts. Similarly, UAW plays a significant role in supporting graduate student organizers, some of whom see UAW as the most responsive union to academic student employees' needs in comparison with traditional education unions. UAW has won affiliations of important student bodies such as graduate student employees in the UC system and in NYU.

== Effects ==
Some graduate students, notably organizers in the union local UAW 2865 representing student workers at nine campuses of the University of California, believe graduate employee unions empower students and gives potential to expand bargaining to items outside of the usual economic benefits or job security. UAW 2865's newest contract includes provisions that allow graduate students to control class sizes, extend financial opportunities to undocumented students, and provide gender-neutral bathrooms for transgender students. Many institutions that represent faculty and teachers such as the American Association of University Professors (AAUP) and the National Education Association support graduate students' right to join a union and to bargain collectively.

Research suggests that unionization has either no impact or a weak positive impact to both academic freedom and faculty-student relationships. Yet many university administrators and higher education-related associations like the American Council on Education and the Association of American Universities argue that unionization threatens academic freedom of institutions by making education policies subject to collective bargaining and harms the relationship between professors and students due to possible conflicts arising from the bargaining process. A 2023 AAUP report showed that despite charging students more, US colleges are hiring fewer tenure-track faculty and more adjunct instructors, who have less protected academic freedom and receive less pay.

== Example unions ==
- UAW Local 4811, University of California
- Northwestern University Graduate Workers, Northwestern University
- Teaching Assistants Association, University of Wisconsin, Madison
- Graduate Employee Organization, University of Massachusetts Amherst
- Graduate Employees and Students Organization, Yale University
- Graduate Employees Together, University of Pennsylvania (has not yet had an election)
- Graduate Assistants United, University of Rhode Island
- Harvard Graduate Students Union, Harvard University
- Graduate Employees' Organization, University of Illinois Urbana–Champaign
- Graduate Employees' Organization 3550, University of Michigan
- Graduate Student Organizing Committee, New York University
- Graduate Students Association, Temple University
- CUPE 3902, University of Toronto Education Workers Union
- Teaching Support Staff Union, Teaching Assistant & Sessional Union at Simon Fraser University
- Graduate Workers Union, University of North Carolina, a chapter of United Electrical Local 150
- Coalition of Graduate Employees (CGE 6069), Oregon State University
- Clark University Graduate Workers United, Clark University, a chapter of Teamsters Local 170
- Boston University Graduate Workers Union, Boston University, a chapter of SEIU Local 509
- Stanford Graduate Workers Union (SGWU), Stanford University, a chapter of the United Electrical, Radio and Machine Workers of America
- Graduate Labor Organization, Brown University
- Teachers and Researcher United, Johns Hopkins University, a chapter of United Electrical Local 197

== See also ==
- Postdoctoral researcher unionization
- Public-sector trade unions in the United States
- List of graduate student employee unions
