= List of graduate student employee unions =

Active Grad Worker Unions

Graduate student employees unions are labor unions that represent graduate students who are employed by their college or university as research assistants, teaching assistants, graduate assistants, or similar.

== In the United States ==
As of July 2023, at least 156 active graduate student employee bargaining units had publicized their unionization in the United States (as counted in the table below).

Active United States graduate student employee bargaining units, established or publicly announced (Note: (?) indicates something is unknown, unclear or not yet decided.)
State	School	Unit Name	Unit Nickname	Status (Note: "Status" is either: Unionizing: unionization is publicly in progress, but unit is not yet certified; Certified: unit is certified, but first contract is not yet ratified; Contracted: unit has ratified a contract; Independent: unit is established, not restricted, and chose against national union affiliation; Restricted: (US only) state law restricts public higher education teacher collective bargaining for this unit; (AL, AR, GA, HI, IN, MD, NC, SC, TN, TX, VA))	Union Local
DC	American University	Graduate Student Workers Union	-	contracted	SEIU 500
AZ	Arizona State University	United Campus Workers of Arizona	-	contracted	CWA 7065
AL	Auburn University	United Campus Workers of Alabama at Auburn University	UCW Auburn	restricted	CWA 3965
TN	Austin Peay State University	United Campus Workers of Tennessee	-	restricted	CWA 3865
MA	Boston College	Boston College Graduate Employees Union	BCGEU	certified	UAW #(?)
MA	Boston University	Boston University Graduate Workers Union	BUGWU	certified	SEIU 509
MA	Brandeis University	Graduate Student Union?	-	contracted	SEIU 509
RI	Brown University	Graduate Labor Organization	GLO	contracted	AFT 6516
CA	California State University System	Academic Student Employees	ASE	contracted	UAW 4123
MI	Central Michigan University	Graduate Student Union	GSU	contracted	AFT 6522
TN	Chattanooga State Community College	United Campus Workers of Tennessee	-	restricted	CWA 3865
NY	City University of New York (CUNY)	Graduate Center Chapter of the Professional Staff Congress	PSC GC	contracted	AFT 2334
MA	Clark University	Clark University Graduate Workers United,	CUGWU	contracted	IBT 170
VA	College of William & Mary	United Campus Workers of Virginia	-	restricted	CWA 2265
CO	Colorado State University	Graduate Workers Organizing Cooperative	GWOK	independent	independent
NY	Columbia University	Student Workers of Columbia	SWC	contracted	UAW 2710
GA	Columbus State University	United Campus Workers of Georgia	-	restricted	CWA 3265
NY	Cornell University	Cornell Graduate Students United	CGSU-UE	contracted	UE 300
NH	Dartmouth College	Graduate Organized Laborers at Dartmouth	GOLD	certified	UE 261
NC	Duke University	Duke Graduate Students Union	-	certified	SEIU 27
TN	East Tennessee State University	United Campus Workers of Tennessee	-	restricted	CWA 3865
KY	Eastern Kentucky University	United Campus Workers of Kentucky	UCWKY-EKU (?)	contracted	CWA 3365
MA	Emerson College	Emerson College Student Union	ECSU	independent	independent
GA	Emory University	EmoryUnite!	-	certified	SEIU 29
FL	Florida A&M University	Graduate Assistants United	GAU	contracted	NEA/AFT #(?)
FL	Florida State University	Graduate Assistants United	GAU	contracted	NEA/AFT #(?)
NY	Fordham University	Fordham Graduate Student Workers	FGSW	certified	CWA 1104
DC	George Washington University	Graduate Workers United	GWU	contracted	(?)
DC	Georgetown University	Georgetown Alliance of Graduate Employees	GAGE	contracted	AFT 6440
GA	Georgia College & State University	United Campus Workers of Georgia	UCWGA-GCSU	restricted	CWA 3265
GA	Georgia Gwinnett College	United Campus Workers of Georgia	UCWGA-GGC	restricted	CWA 3265
GA	Georgia Institute of Technology (GA Tech)	United Campus Workers of Georgia	UCWGA-GT	restricted	CWA 3265
GA	Georgia Southern University	United Campus Workers of Georgia	-	restricted	CWA 3265
GA	Georgia Southwestern State University	United Campus Workers of Georgia	UCWGSW	restricted	CWA 3265
GA	Georgia State University	United Campus Workers of Georgia	UCWGA-GSU	restricted	CWA 3265
GA	Georgia State University Perimeter College	United Campus Workers of Georgia	-	restricted	CWA 3265
MA	Harvard University	Harvard Undergraduate Workers Union	HUWU	contracted	UAW 5118
MA	Harvard University	Harvard Graduate Students Union	HGSU	contracted	UAW 5118
NY	Icahn School of Medicine at Mount Sinai	Sinai Student Workers	SSW	unionizing	UAW #tbd
IL	Illinois State University	Graduate Workers Union	GWU	contracted	SEIU 73
IN	Indiana University - Bloomington	Indiana Graduate Workers Coalition	-	restricted	UE #(?)
FL	Jacksonville State University	(?)	To be decided (?)	unionizing	(?)
MD	Johns Hopkins University	Teachers and Researchers United	TRU	contracted	UE 197
GA	Kennesaw State University	United Campus Workers of Georgia	UCWGA-KSU	restricted	CWA 3265
KY	Kentucky Community & Technical College System	United Campus Workers of Kentucky	-	contracted	CWA 3365
TN	Lemoyne-Owen College	United Campus Workers of Tennessee	-	unionizing	CWA 3865
LA	Louisiana State University	United Campus Workers of Louisiana	-	contracted	CWA 3465
IL	Loyola University Chicago	Loyola Graduate Workers' Union	LGWU	contracted	SEIU 73
MA	Massachusetts Institute of Technology (MIT)	Graduate Student Union	GSU	contracted	UE 256
MI	Michigan State University	Graduate Employees Union	GEU	contracted	AFT 6196
TN	Middle Tennessee State University	United Campus Workers of Tennessee	-	restricted	CWA 3865
MS	Mississippi State University	United Campus Workers of Mississippi	-	unionizing	CWA 3565
MT	Montana State University	Graduate Employee Organization	GEO	contracted	AFT 7756
KY	Morehead State University	United Campus Workers of Kentucky	-	unionizing	CWA 3365
KY	Murray State University	United Campus Workers of Kentucky	-	contracted	CWA 3365
NJ	New Jersey Institute of Technology	Graduate Student & Research Employee Unit	GSRE	contracted	AFT/AAUP 6323(?)
NM	New Mexico State University	Graduate Workers United	GWU	contracted	UE 1498
NY	New York University (NYU)	Graduate Student Organizing Committee	GSOC	contracted	UAW 2110
NC	North Carolina State University	NC State Graduate Workers Union	-	restricted	UE 150
MA	Northeastern University	Graduate Employees of Northeastern University	GENU	contracted	UAW #(?)
AZ	Northern Arizona University	University Union of Northern Arizona	UUNA	contracted	AFT 5196
IL	Northwestern University	Northwestern University Graduate Workers	NUGW	contracted	UE 1122
OR	Oregon Health & Science University	Graduate Researchers United	GRU	contracted	AFSCME 402
OR	Oregon State University	Coalition of Graduate Employees	CGE	contracted	AFT 6069
TN	Pellissippi State Community College	United Campus Workers of Tennessee	-	restricted	CWA 3865
PA	Pennsylvania State University	Coalition of Graduate Employees at Pennsylvania State University	CGEPSU	unionizing	To be decided
OR	Portland State University	Graduate Employees Union	GEU	contracted	AFT/AAUP 6666
NJ	Princeton University	Princeton Graduate Students United	PGSU	unionizing	UE #(?)
IN	Purdue University	Graduate Rights and Our Well-Being	GROW	restricted	(?)
NJ	Rutgers University	Rutgers AAUP-AFT Academic Worker Union	Rutgers AAUP	contracted	AFT/AAUP 6323
IL	Southern Illinois University at Carbondale	Graduate Assistants United,	GA United	contracted	NEA #(?)
IL	Southern Illinois University Edwardsville	SIUE Graduate Workers Forward (?)	-	contracted	SEIU 73
TN	Southwest Tennessee Community College	United Campus Workers of Tennessee	-	unionizing	CWA 3865
CA	Stanford University	Stanford Graduate Workers Union	SGWU	certified	UE 1043
NY	State University of New York (SUNY)	Graduate Student Employees Union	GSEU	contracted	CWA 1104
NY	Stony Brook University	Research Assistants Union	RA Union	contracted	CWA 1104
NY	Syracuse University	Syracuse Graduate Employees United	SGEU	certified	SEIU 200 United
PA	Temple University	Temple University Graduate Students' Association	TUGSA	contracted	AFT 6290
TN	Tennessee State University	United Campus Workers of Tennessee	-	restricted	CWA 3865
TN	Tennessee Tech University	United Campus Workers of Tennessee	-	restricted	CWA 3865
NY	The New School	Student Employees at The New School	SENS	contracted	UAW 7902
AL	Troy University	name?	-	restricted	To be decided
LA	Tulane University	Solidarity Tulane,	SolTul	independent	independent
MA	Tufts University	Tufts University Graduate Workers Union	TUGWU	contracted	SEIU 509
AL	University of Alabama	United Campus Workers of Alabama - University of Alabama	UCWAL - UA	restricted	CWA 3965
AL	University of Alabama at Birmingham	(?)	-	restricted	To be decided
AK	University of Alaska	Alaskan Graduate Workers Association	AGWA	certified	UAW #tbd
AZ	University of Arizona	United Campus Workers of Arizona	-	contracted	CWA 7065
AR	University of Arkansas	Fayetteville Education Association	-	restricted	NEA 965
CA	University of California system	Academic Student Employees	ASE	contracted	UAW 4811
CA	University of California system	Student Researchers (Student Researchers United-UAW)	SR	contracted	UAW 4811
IL	University of Chicago	Graduate Students United	GSU	contracted	UE 1103
IL	University of Chicago	Student Library Employee Union	SLEU	contracted	IBT 743
CO	University of Colorado Boulder	United Campus Workers Colorado	-	unionizing	CWA 7799
CT	University of Connecticut (UConn)	Graduate Employee & Postdoc Union	GEU	contracted	UAW 6950
FL	University of Florida	Graduate Assistants United	GAU	contracted	NEA/AFT #(?)
GA	University of Georgia	United Campus Workers of Georgia	UCWGA-UGA	restricted	CWA 3265
HI	University of Hawai'i at Mānoa	Academic Labor United	To be decided	restricted	To be decided
IL	University of Illinois Chicago	Graduate Employees Organization	GEO	contracted	AFT 6297
IL	University of Illinois Springfield	Association of Graduate Employees,	AGE	contracted	AFT 4100
IL	University of Illinois Urbana-Champaign	Graduate Employees' Organization	GEO	contracted	AFT 6300
IA	University of Iowa	Campaign to Organize Graduate Students	COGS	contracted	UE 896
KS	University of Kansas	Graduate Teaching Assistants Coalition	GTAC	contracted	AFT 6403
KY	University of Kentucky	United Campus Workers of Kentucky	-	contracted	CWA 3365
KY	University of Louisville	United Campus Workers of Kentucky	-	contracted	CWA 3365
ME	University of Maine	University of Maine Graduate Workers Union	UMGWU	certified	UAW #tbd
MD	University of Maryland, College Park	University of Maryland Graduate Labor Union	UMD-GLU	restricted	UAW #tbd
MA	University of Massachusetts Amherst	Graduate Employee Organization	GEO	contracted	UAW 2322
MA	University of Massachusetts Boston	Graduate Employee Organization	GEO	contracted	UAW 1596
MA	University of Massachusetts Dartmouth	name in progress since 4/27/2023	nickname in progress since 4/27/2023	certified	AFT 6350
MA	University of Massachusetts Lowell	Graduate Employee Organization	GEO	contracted	UAW 1596
TN	University of Memphis	United Campus Workers of Tennessee	-	unionizing	CWA 3865
FL	University of Miami	Graduate Workers Union	GWU (?)	unionizing	To be decided
MI	University of Michigan	Graduate Employees' Organization	GEO	contracted	AFT 3550
MN	University of Minnesota	Graduate Labor Union	GLU	certified	UE 1105
MS	University of Mississippi	United Campus Workers of Mississippi,		unionizing	CWA 3565
MO	University of Missouri - Kansas City	Graduate Rights Organization,	GRO	independent	independent
NE	University of Nebraska-Lincoln	Unionize UNL	-	unionizing	To be decided
NH	University of New Hampshire	Graduate Employees United	UNH-GEU-UAW	certified	UAW #tbd
NM	University of New Mexico	United Grad Workers	UGW	contracted	UE 1466
LA	University of New Orleans	United Campus Workers of Louisiana	-	unionizing	CWA 3465
NC	University of North Carolina at Chapel Hill	The Workers Union at UNC	-	restricted	UE 150
NC	University of North Carolina Charlotte	(?)	-	restricted	UE 150
NC	University of North Carolina Greensboro	(?)	-	restricted	UE 150
GA	University of North Georgia	United Campus Workers of Georgia	UCWGA-UNG	restricted	CWA 3265
OR	University of Oregon	Graduate Teaching Fellows Federation	GTFF	contracted	AFT 3544
PA	University of Pennsylvania (UPenn)	Graduate Employees Together at the University of Pennsylvania	GET-UP	certified	UAW 5124
RI	University of Rhode Island	Graduate Assistants United	GAU	contracted	NEA #(?)
SC	University of South Carolina	United Campus Workers of South Carolina	-	restricted	CWA 3765
FL	University of South Florida	Graduate Assistants United	GAU	contracted	NEA/AFT #(?)
CA	University of Southern California	Graduate Student Worker Organizing Committee	GSWOC	contracted	UAW #(?)
MS	University of Southern Mississippi	United Campus Workers of Mississippi	-	unionizing	CWA 3565
TN	University of Tennessee at Martin	United Campus Workers of Tennessee	-	unionizing	CWA 3865
TN	University of Tennessee at Chattanooga	United Campus Workers of Tennessee	-	restricted	CWA 3865
TN	University of Tennessee Health Science Center	United Campus Workers of Tennessee	-	unionizing	CWA 3865
TN	University of Tennessee Knoxville	United Campus Workers of Tennessee	-	restricted	CWA 3865
TX	University of Texas at Austin	UT Graduate Workers Union	UTGWU	restricted	none, independent
TX	Texas A&M	Texas A&M Graduate Workers Union	-	restricted	none, independent
VT	University of Vermont	Graduate Students United	GSU	certified	UAW 2322
VA	University of Virginia	United Campus Workers of Virginia	-	restricted	CWA 2265
WA	University of Washington	Research Coordinators & Research Consultants	To be decided	certified	UAW 4121
WA	University of Washington	Researchers United	UW Researchers United	contracted	UAW 4121
WA	University of Washington	Postdoctoral Scholars	-	contracted	UAW 4121
WA	University of Washington	Academic Student Employees	ASEs	contracted	UAW 4121
GA	University of West Georgia	United Campus Workers of Georgia	UCWGA-UWG	restricted	CWA 3265
WI	University of Wisconsin - Milwaukee	AAUP // UW-Milwaukee Chapter	UWM-AAUP	contracted	AAUP #(?)
WI	University of Wisconsin-Madison	Teaching Assistants' Association	TAA	contracted	AFT 3220
TN	Vanderbilt University	Vanderbilt Graduate Workers United	VGWU	unionizing	UAW #(?)
VA	Virginia Commonwealth University	United Campus Workers of Virginia	-	restricted	CWA 2265
WA	Washington State University	Coalition of Academic Student Employees	CASE	contracted	UAW 4591
MO	Washington University in St. Louis	Washington University Undergraduate and Graduate Workers' Union	WUGWU	independent	independent
MI	Wayne State University	Graduate Employees Organizing Committee	GEOC	contracted	AFT 6123
MI	Western Michigan University	Teaching Assistants Union	TAU	contracted	AFT 1729
WA	Western Washington University	Educational Student Employees	Western Academic Workers United	contracted	WAWU-UAW 4929
WA	Western Washington University	Operational Student Employees	Western Academic Workers United	unionizing	WAWU-UAW 4929
NC	Winston Salem State University	(?)	-	restricted	UE 150
MA	Woods Hole Oceanographic Institution (WHOI-MIT Joint Program)	Graduate Student Union	GSU	unionizing	UE #tbd
MA	Worcester Polytechnic University (WPI)	Graduate Workers Union	WPI-GWU	contracted	UAW 2322
CT	Yale University	Local 33	Local 33	contracted	UNITE HERE! 33
MO	Saint Louis University	Graduate Workers SLU Union	SLUUnion	certified	UAW #(?)

== In Canada ==
As of July 2023, at least 14 active graduate student employee bargaining units had publicized their unionization in Canada (as counted in the table below).

Active Canadian graduate student employee bargaining units, established or publicly announced
Province	School	Unit Name	Unit Nickname	Status	Union Local
QC	McGill University (Université McGill)	Association of Graduate Students Employed at McGill (L’Association des étudiant.e.s diplômé.e.s employé.e.s de McGill)	AGSEM (AEEDEM) Unit 1	contracted	CSN
QC	McGill University (Université McGill)	Association of Graduate Students Employed at McGill (L’Association des étudiant.e.s diplômé.e.s employé.e.s de McGill)	AGSEM (AEEDEM) Unit 2	Contracted	CSN
QC	McGill University (Université McGill)	Association of McGill University Research Employees (Association des employées et employés de recherche de l’université McGill)	AMURE (AERUM) Unit 1	Contracted	PSAC 17601
QC	McGill University (Université McGill)	Association of McGill University Support Employees (Le syndicat des employé.e.s occassionel.le.s de l’Université McGill)	AMUSE (SEOUM) Unit 1	Contracted	PSAC 17600
QC	McGill University (Université McGill)	Association of McGill University Support Employees (Le syndicat des employé.e.s occassionel.le.s de l’Université McGill)	AMUSE (SEOUM) Unit 2	Contracted	PSAC 17600
QC	McGill University (Université McGill)	McGill Course Lecturers and Instructors Union (Syndicat des chargé(e)s de cours et instructeurs(trices) de McGill)	MCLIU (SCCIM)	Contracted	CSN
AB	University of Calgary	Graduate Labour Union Calgary	GLU Calgary	Contracted	N/A
AB	University of Alberta	Graduate Student Association Labour Relations Committee	GSA	Contracted	N/A
BC	Simon Fraser University	Teaching Support Staff Union	TSSU	Independent	Independent
BC	University of British Columbia	CUPE 2278	-	Contracted	CUPE 2278
ON	Ontario Institute for Studies in Education of the University of Toronto	Education Workers Unit 7	-	Contracted	CUPE 3902
ON	Queen's University	Graduate Teaching Assistants, Graduate Teaching Fellows, Graduate Research Assistants and JD and MD Teaching Assistants at Queen's University	PSAC 901 Unit 1	Contracted	PSAC 901
ON	Queen's University	Postdoctoral Fellows at Queen's University	PSAC 901 Unit 2	Contracted	PSAC 901
ON	University of St. Michael's College	Education Workers Unit 4	-	Contracted	CUPE 3902
ON	University of Toronto	Education Workers Unit 1	-	Contracted	CUPE 3902
ON	University of Toronto	Education Workers Unit 3	CUPE 3902 U3	Contracted	CUPE 3902
ON	University of Toronto New College International Programs	Education Workers Unit 6	-	Contracted	CUPE 3902
ON	Victoria University	Education Workers Unit 2	-	Contracted	CUPE 3902
ON	Western University	Teaching Assistants' and Postdoctoral Associates' Union at Western University	PSAC 601	Contracted	PSAC 601

== See also ==
- Graduate student employee unionization
