= Graduate Employees Together – University of Pennsylvania =

Union of university graduates

Graduate Employees Together – University of Pennsylvania (GET-UP) is the graduate student research and teaching employees union at the University of Pennsylvania.

The group (GET-UP 1.0), first formed in the spring of 2001, and affiliated with the American Federation of Teachers (AFT). In 2004, according to exit polling by The Daily Pennsylvanian, the limited set of University of Pennsylvania graduate student employees included in the bargaining unit voted for unionization; however, the National Labor Relations Board (NLRB), before the votes were counted, decided that graduate students in private universities are not employees, while graduate students in public universities may be employees. The group re-formed in 2016 (GET-UP Today), and re-affiliated with AFT in October 2016. On March 2, 2017 the group once again decided to go public with their unionization campaign.

In April of 2023, GET-UP went public with a new organizing drive, this time affiliated with the United Auto Workers. The new drive was inaugurated by an announcement that more than 1,900 doctoral, masters, and undergraduate students had signed union authorization cards. A few days later several hundred workers rallied outside of Van Pelt Library calling for improved working conditions. This organizing drive follows unionization campaigns for Penn medical residents with the Service Employees International Union and resident assistants with the Office and Professional Employees International Union.

In May 2024, GET-UP members voted to unionize by 95% approval. A contract was approved in February 2026.

It may be the largest-ever private-sector union formed in Philadelphia, according to research by leaders at the AFL-CIO Philadelphia Council.

== History ==
=== Prehistory ===
While graduate employee unions are commonplace outside of the United States they exist at less than half of American public universities, and there has been only one recognized union at a private American university. The first graduate employee union in the USA was formed in 1970 at the University of Wisconsin–Madison when the Teaching Assistants Association won recognition and its first contract. Between 1970 and 2000 graduate employees organized many unions at public universities, and today an estimated 20% of graduate employees in the US work under a collective bargaining agreement. (See also: Graduate student employee unionization) Graduate employee unions did not exist at private universities until October 2000, when the NLRB ruled in the landmark case of Graduate Student Organizing Committee (GSOC) at New York University (NYU) that graduate employees at private universities are to be considered employees according to the definition put forth in the National Labor Relations Act.

=== GET-UP 1.0 ===
The movement between the years 2001-2004 was GET-UP's first campaign, where according to The Daily Pennsylvanian, 60% of the grad employees voted for a union. However, in 2004, as NLRB reversed their decision, an actual vote tally never occurred.

==== GET-UP Certification Campaign ====
A flurry of student initiated organizing activity took place at private universities in the wake of the 2000 NLRB decision. By the end of 2001 there were active recognition campaigns taking place at many Ivy League schools, including UPenn. The Penn campaign started when a diverse group of graduate students began meeting in the fall of 2000 to discuss concerns related to their employment status. A group formed at UPenn and chose the name GET-UP. A vote was taken by the students and the decision was made to affiliate with the American Federation of Teachers, AFL-CIO. The new union began a certification card drive, and on December 27, 2001 GET-UP filed a petition to the NLRB for a union authorization election. A certification election was scheduled for February 26, 2003; however, the National Labor Relations Board overturned the decision to allow graduate students to unionize before the votes could be counted.

==== GET-UP Authorization Election ====
The November 2002 decision by the NLRB allowed for an election to take place in early 2003. However, an appeal was filed in regards to the NLRB decision and the votes were sealed and left uncounted until a ruling could be reached. The NLRB decided to overturn the decision in 2004.

==== Election Anniversary Strike ====
After a year of increasing pressure from GET-UP and its allies failed to convince the University to drop its appeal and allow the NLRB to count the ballots cast in the certification election, the union members felt that a significant action was necessary to move the process forward. At the Spring 2004 GET-UP general membership meeting, after a half-hour debate, an 83 percent majority voted to withdraw their labor on the two days of the election's anniversary. The plan was not for a full academic strike, as GET-UP did not ask professors to cancel classes or for undergrads not to attend. Rather, the membership approved of the limited strike as a way of demonstrating their seriousness while still giving the University a chance to drop its appeal and negotiate. There was debate among undergrads, grad students, grad employees, and faculty about whether the limited strike was a good tactic or not, with people from all four groups both for and against the strike.

==== 2004 NLRB National Board Decision ====
At the start of the fall semester of 2004 the National Labor Relations Board announced a complete reversal of its 2000 decision in the case of NYU in a 3-2 decision regarding graduate employees at Brown University. The Republican controlled board stated in their decision that "there is a significant risk, even a strong likelihood, that the collective-bargaining process will be detrimental to the educational process." The dissenting opinion stated that "Today's decision is woefully out of touch with contemporary academic reality", and further that "It disregards the plain language of" Section 2(3) of the National Labor Relations Act, which "defines employees so broadly that graduate students who perform services for, and under the control of, their universities are easily covered". With the new board's decision a regional board of the NLRB ruled that the decision also applied in Penn's case. As a result, the votes cast in the 2004 election will never be counted and unfair labor practice charges were also dropped, as graduate employees at private Universities are no longer protected employees under the National Labor Relations Act.

=== GET-UP 2.0 ===
==== History ====
In the fall of 2015, graduate students from the University of Pennsylvania decided to start another unionization campaign, ten years after initial unionization efforts. In the spring of 2016, they ratified a constitution and formalized their presence. According to the organization’s website, the effort named itself GET-UP as a tribute to the first unionization effort (GET-UP 1.0). GET-UP members voted once again to affiliate with the AFT in the fall of 2016.

==== NLRB Columbia Decision ====
On August 23, 2016, the NLRB ruled that graduate student assistants in private universities are statutory employees covered by National Labor Relations Act; this decision is also known as Columbia decision. The 3-1 decision reversed the 2004 Brown University ruling. The majority justified the new ruling by stating that the Brown University decision “deprived an entire category of workers of the protections of the Act without a convincing justification.”

==== Certification Campaign ====
Following NLRB Columbia Decision, GET-UP began to organize graduate students. On March 2, 2017, according to The Daily Pennsylvanian, GET-UP went public with their campaign in a meeting of more than 200 GET-UP members, who voted unanimously to begin public unionization efforts at the University. The campaign is still ongoing as of December 2017.

==== Petition for Recognition Election ====
On May 30, 2017, GET-UP/AFT announced that they had filed a petition to the NLRB to hold a recognition election.

==== Withdrawal of Petition ====
In February 2018, GET-UP withdrew their petition to the NLRB.

== See also ==
- American Federation of Teachers
- AFL-CIO
- Coalition of Graduate Employee Unions
- List of graduate student employee unions
