= 2020 Michigan graduate students' strike =

2020 labor strike at the University of Michigan

2020 Michigan graduate students strike
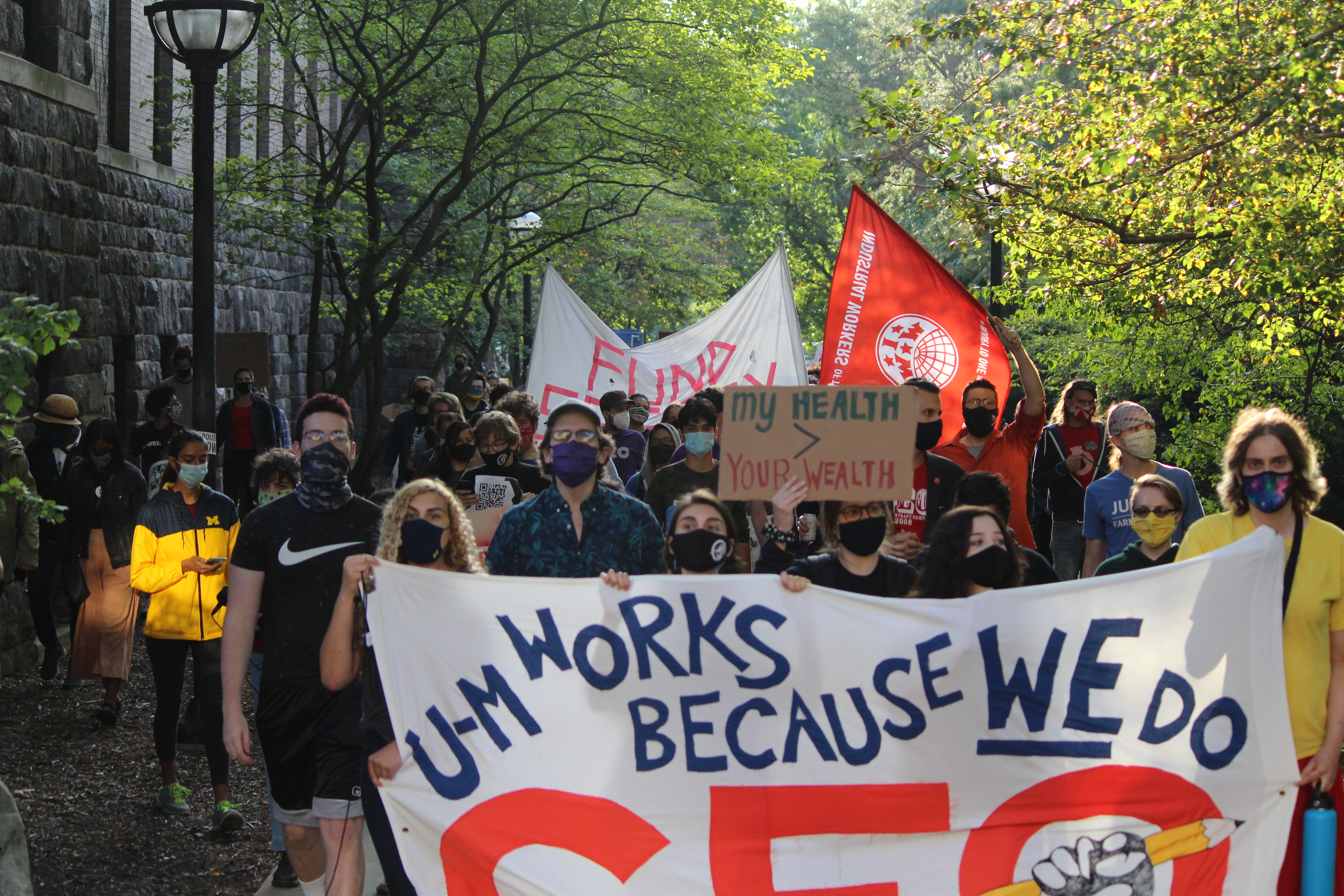
- GEO members and supporters protesting
- Date: September 8–16, 2020
- Location: University of Michigan, Ann Arbor, Michigan, United States
- Goals: Increased COVID-19 testing; Right to remote work; Defunding the campus police

Parties
Graduate Employees' Organization 3550: 2,100 graduate student instructors	University of Michigan

The 2020 Michigan graduate students' strike was a labor strike launched by the Graduate Employees' Organization 3550 (GEO 3550), the graduate student employee union that represents approximately 2,100 graduate student instructors at the University of Michigan in Ann Arbor, Michigan, United States. The main cause of the strike was related to graduate students' objection to the university's plans for reopening during the COVID-19 pandemic. Additional calls were made by the union for defunding the campus police. The strike started on September 8, 2020, and was scheduled to last for four days, with a subsequent vote extending the strike for another week. Following the start of the strike, resident assistants and student employees for the university's dining services announced they would also strike over similar concerns regarding the university's COVID-19 policies.

On September 16, union members voted to end the strike, with work resuming the following day.

== Background ==
Prior to the strike, graduate student instructors (GSIs) at the University of Michigan expressed objections to the university administration's plans for reopening during the COVID-19 pandemic. On August 31, members of GEO 3550, the graduate student employee union at the university representing approximately 2,100 GSIs, protested outside the house of President of the University of Michigan Mark Schlissel and organized a die-in. On September 7 (Labor Day), the union announced a labor strike that would start the next day following a general membership vote held the previous day that saw 80% of voters approve strike action. According to the GEO 3550 president, just under 600 members voted in favor of striking and slightly less than 100 voted against it, with some members unavailable for the vote due to being away for Labor Day weekend. The strike was scheduled to last for four days, with a vote scheduled afterwards that would extend the strike for another week if union demands were not met. A previous strike organized by GEO 3550 in 2008 had lasted only two days.

Demands by the union included a universal right to remote work, increased COVID-19 testing (including random testing) by the university, and defunding the police on campus, with 50% of the campus police's budget to be reallocated towards community programs. The Lecturers' Employee Organization (LEO), the union for lecturers at Michigan, announced on Labor Day that they support the GSIs' strike and share similar concerns over the campus's reopening policies. However, LEO officials reminded members that they would not be participating in the strike, and that any members involved in strike action would be subject to disciplinary action. In response to the call for a strike, the university highlighted that the strike would violate both the law of Michigan and the contract between the union and university signed in April 2020. Additionally, the university claimed that some of the demands from the union could not be resolved through collective bargaining or contract renegotiations. The Detroit-based alternative newspaper Metro Times called the university's actions "ironic," considering that their response came on Labor Day, a day strongly tied to the American labor movement.

== Course of the strike ==
The strike began on September 8, with GSIs performing a work stoppage and picketing around the university campus. That same day, the university filed an unfair labor practice charge against the union for violating terms of their contract. Later that night, the Central Student Government Assembly, a student government at the university, unanimously passed a resolution in support of the strike, urging students to not attend classes in solidarity with the strikers. The next day, September 9, over 100 resident assistants at the university announced that they would also go on strike, demanding both better protections from COVID-19 and hazard pay. Additionally, graduate student unions at Harvard University and Western Michigan University expressed support for the strike, and some construction workers at the university joined striking GSIs on their picket lines. That night, the union held a general meeting where they voted to reject a proposal that had been put forward by the university that would have ended the strike. The proposal had been supported by GEO 3550 leadership, but was rejected by an "overwhelming majority" of the general membership, with 736 voting to reject, 428 voting to approve, and 81 abstaining. Following the rejection, the university issued a release describing the proposal in greater detail, also claiming that the strike has disrupted thousands of classes since its start and reiterating the illegality of the strike. The university also claimed that they would rescind their unfair labor practice charge and not penalize striking employees if a deal could be reached that would end the strike.

On September 10, student employees for the university's dining services announced they would perform a walkout the next day to also protest the university's COVID-19 policies. The strike expired that same day, with a vote scheduled over the next two days that would determine if the strike would be prolonged. On September 11, about 250 protestors gathered at the Michigan Union, where multiple speeches were given on issues pertaining to the strike. By September 13, the union announced that 80% of the votes cast were in favor of extending the strike for another week. The next day, President Schlissel announced that the university would be seeking a restraining order and a preliminary injunction against the union through the Washtenaw County Circuit Court to stop the strike. According to the university, the union could be held in contempt of court and face civil damages if the injunction is granted. That same day, U.S. Representative Rashida Tlaib of Michigan voiced her support for the strikers, accusing the university of "union-busting via the courts."

On September 16, GEO 3550 held a press conference on the steps of the Hatcher Graduate Library where they elaborated on some of their anti-policing demands and said that they received support on both a local and national level. The conference included several members of the university community discussing their concerns with the university's COVID-19 response. On the night of September 16, the union held a vote during a general meeting regarding a continuation of the strike. Ultimately, the union voted to end the strike with a vote of 1,074 to 239, with 66 members abstaining. Statements by the union claimed that the university made "substantial movements" on all of the union's demands, including policing reforms that had not been addressed in the university's first proposal to the union. The demands that were met were described by the union as "commitments," and no steps were made toward the union's so-called "abolitionist" goals. As part of the end to the strike, the university agreed to drop its case with the Circuit Court to intervene in the work stoppage, as such a case would be rendered moot. Ultimately, the strike was the longest in GEO 3550 history since 1975.

== Aftermath ==
On September 16, at a meeting of the faculty senate of the University of Michigan which attracted over 2,000 participants, members voted 957 to 953 on a vote of no confidence against President Schlissel, with 184 faculty members abstaining. While the vote was initially reported to have failed, the senate issued a statement on September 18 that said that, after a closer reading of Robert's Rules of Order regarding parliamentary procedure, the vote had actually passed. This was the first time the faculty senate had ever voted no confidence on a president, with the senate stating that they have "exhausted all channels of communication to express their grave concerns about reopening plans" and that the president "has shown little substantial changes in policy in response to expressed concerns". The vote is a symbolic act, as the president is ultimately accountable not to the faculty, but to the Regents of the University of Michigan, who stated their support of Schlissel on September 17.

On September 17, an open letter was published by staff members of the university in which they voiced alarm at the university's response to the strike actions and stated that they "believe many of the issues GEO and other student activists are fighting for remain unresolved". The letter, which also stated support for the resident assistants' demands, was signed by 116 university staff members by September 19.

== See also ==
- 2020 Santa Cruz graduate students' strike
- COVID-19 pandemic in Michigan
- Impact of the COVID-19 pandemic on education
- Strikes during the COVID-19 pandemic
