= Temple University Graduate Students Association =

TUGSA
- Temple University Graduate Students Association
- Founded: September 26, 2001; 25 years ago
- Headquarters: Philadelphia, Pennsylvania, U.S.
- Location: United States
- Parent organization: American Federation of Teachers
- Affiliations: AFL–CIO
- Website: www.tugsa.org

The Temple University Graduate Students Association (TUGSA) is a graduate employee union that is located at Temple University in Philadelphia, Pennsylvania, in the United States.

== History ==
During the fall of 2001, the Labor Relations Board of the Commonwealth of Pennsylvania ruled that graduate students at Temple University must be classified as employees of the university and, as such employees, had the right to unionize.

On March 28, 2001, graduate students at Temple University voted 290 to 16 to form a graduate student union and begin collective bargaining to improve their pay and benefits. It became known as the Temple University Graduate Students Association (also known as TUGSA).

Although Temple executives filed a challenge, in May 2001, to the state labor board's ruling, arguing for a second time that, although graduate students were "paid to teach undergraduates and assist professors in their research," they were still "primarily students and therefore should not have the right to unionize." After deliberating, the state labor board ruled in favor of the students, allowing TUGSA to proceed with its unionization efforts. In June and September 2001, TUGSA members participated in public rallies to pressure Temple's leadership to agree to collective bargaining.

TUGSA subsequently won the battle on September 26, 2001, when Temple's board of trustees voted to recognize the union. Its members ratified TUGSA's first contract with the university on May 18, 2002, after the trustees had voted to approve it on May 14.

Although graduate employees had formed unions in other states since 1970, the TUGSA contract marked the first time that graduate employees in Pennsylvania were able to successfully bargain a contract with their employer. TUGSA is affiliated with the American Federation of Teachers/AFL–CIO.

On November 11, 2022, TUGSA members voted 99% in favor of authorizing a strike. On January 31, 2023, TUGSA officially went on strike, citing grievances with Temple University Administration over negotiating a new collective bargaining agreement. An initial tentative agreement would be voted down by union membership, with 83% of members voting and 92% rejecting the deal. A second tentative agreement would be reached, with 97% voting in favor of the deal. The strike lasted 42 days, attracting attention from local politicians like Malcolm Kenyatta, as well as national figures like Bernie Sanders.

== First contract ==
Like the first contract for GSOC at New York University, the first TUGSA contract resulted in significant improvements for the graduate employees in terms of their healthcare and wages. The contract was also significant in that it marked the first time that Temple University allowed same sex domestic partners to enroll in its health plan.

== See also ==
- Coalition of Graduate Employee Unions
- List of graduate student employee unions
- National Labor Relations Board
