= Timeline of strikes in 2000 =

Strikes in 2000

In 2000, a number of labour strikes, labour disputes, and other industrial actions occurred.

== Background ==
A labour strike is a work stoppage caused by the mass refusal of employees to work. This can include wildcat strikes, which are done without union authorisation, and slowdown strikes, where workers reduce their productivity while still carrying out minimal working duties. It is usually a response to employee grievances, such as low pay or poor working conditions. Strikes can also occur to demonstrate solidarity with workers in other workplaces or pressure governments to change policies.

== Timeline ==
=== Continuing strikes from 1999 ===
- 1999–2002 AK Steel lockout. 3-year lockout imposed on AK Steel steelworkers in the United States.
- Cochabamba Water War
- 1999–2000 El Salvadoran healthcare strike
- 1998–2000 Kaiser Aluminum strike, 2-year strike by Kaiser Aluminum metalworkers in the United States.
- 1999–2000 Nigerien teachers strike. 4-month strike by schoolteachers in Niger over unpaid wages.
- 1999 UNAM strike

=== January ===
- 2000 Cape Breton miners strike. 2-week wildcat strike by Cape Breton Development Corporation miners over the closure of the Prince Mine.
- 2000 University of Toronto strike. 4-week strike by University of Toronto teaching assistants, represented by CUPE 3902, over tuition fees.
- 2000 Uttar Pradesh electric strike, 11-day strike by Uttar Pradesh Power Corporation Limited workers in Uttar Pradesh, India.

=== February ===
- 2000 Boeing engineers' strike
- 2000 Volkswagen South Africa strike

=== March ===
- 2000 Costa Rican protests

=== April ===
- 2000 Finnish paper workers' strike
- 2000 Indonesian teachers' strike

=== May ===
- 2000 commercial actors strike
- 2000 French security guards strike
- 2000 Moulinex strike, 6-week strike by Moulinex workers in Barbastro, Spain.
- 2000 Norwegian private sector strike

=== July ===
- 2000 South Korean bank strikes

=== August ===
- 2000 South Korean medical strike
- Verizon strike of 2000

=== September ===
- 2000 Copenhagen childcare strike
- 2000 uprising in Egypt
- 2000 Wallonian bus strike

=== October ===
- 2000 Italian McDonald's strikes, first strike by McDonald's fast food workers in Italy.
- October 2000 protests in Israel
- 2000 São Tomé and Principe health workers' strike
- 2000–03 prisoners' hunger strike in Turkey
- 2000–01 York University strike. 78-day strike by York University teaching assistants and contract faculty.

=== November ===
- 2000 Luxembourg cash-in-transit strike
- 2000–01 Seattle newspaper strike

=== December ===
- 2000 Indian postal strike
- Ukraine without Kuchma
