= CUPE 3902 =

Canadian labour union

- University of Toronto Education Workers, Canadian Union of Public Employees, Local 3902
- Founded: 1973; 53 years ago
- Headquarters: Toronto, Ontario
- Location: Canada
- Members: 10,000+
- Parent organization: CUPE
- Website: www.cupe3902.org

The Canadian Union of Public Employees, Local 3902 (CUPE 3902) is a Canadian labour union local representing contract-academic workers at the University of Toronto and its federated universities Victoria University and the University of St. Michael's College. Those represented include teaching assistants (TAs), exam-service workers (chief presiding officers, invigilators), sessional lecturers, writing instructors, music professionals, postdoctoral researchers and graduate assistants. It is the largest labour union at the University of Toronto.

== Organization ==
CUPE 3902 is organized into seven bargaining units:

- Unit 1: Student or post-doctoral fellow TAs, course instructors, invigilators, and Chief Presiding Officers (CPOs). This is the largest unit with 7,000 people.
- Unit 2: all persons employed by Victoria University on contracts of less than one-year as lecturers, demonstrators, tutors, markers, graders or teaching/laboratory assistants.
- Unit 3: Sessional lecturers, music professionals, writing instructors, and sessional instruction assistants.
- Unit 4: Course instructors, teaching assistants, writing instructors, and continuing education instructors at St. Michael's College.
- Unit 5: Post-doctoral fellows.
- Unit 6: Non-Credit Instructors at New College.
- Unit 7: following the transfer of jurisdiction and dissolution of CUPE 3907, Graduate Assistants at OISE.

== History ==
The predecessor of CUPE 3902 was the first graduate employee union to receive certification by a Labour Relations Board in North America. Prior to the certification by the Ontario Labour Relations Board in 1974, graduate employees in Canada had no representation in negotiating the terms and conditions of work. As of 2006, most graduate student employees in English Canadian universities had been unionized.

=== Negotiations begin ===
The first collective agreement (1975-1977) reduced the 444 pay categories to three. Hiring procedures were established and a grievance procedure was formulated to solve problems and to settle disputes and differences of opinion between TAs and course instructors and the Administration.

=== Growth of the national union ===
At the same time, TAs and sessional lecturers were organizing at York University (now Local 3903 of CUPE) and Ryerson University (now Toronto Metropolitan University) (3904). The National Union grew, if chaotically, in those early years, organizing TAs at Lakehead University (3905), TAs and contract faculty at McMaster University (3906), and graduate assistants at OISE (3907). In 1980, the Union renamed itself the Canadian Union of Educational Workers (CUEW). CUEW eventually organized contract faculty at Trent University (3908), TAs and student instructors at the University of Manitoba (3909), contract faculty at the University of Ottawa (which disaffiliated in 1992), and contract faculty at Athabasca University (3911). By the early 1990s, organizing drives were launched which yielded two more locals — Dalhousie University (3912) and the University of Guelph (3913).

=== Merger with CUPE ===
However, the National Union had entered a financial and leadership crisis which resulted in merger discussions with CUPE. The local joined CUPE on January 1st, 1995.

=== Expansion of the bargaining unit ===
Starting in 1997, the Union began to work with non-student instructional staff to join CUPE 3902. After two applications, and an extended process in front of the Ontario Labour Relations Board, sessionals finally certified in the summer of 2004. The Union worked with contract instructional staff at Victoria University, successfully certifying in the summer of 2004. Both of these units negotiated a first contract in 2004-2005. The sessionals' Agreement was ratified on 1 April 2005, and the Victoria Agreement was ratified on 4 May 2005.

== Strikes ==
CUPE 3902 has signed Collective Agreements for what is now Unit 1 with the U of T since it was organized. The local has engaged in five strikes since its formation.

- In 1989 the local struck primarily over the issue of job security.
- In 1991 the local struck over the issue of overwork - establishing industry-standard rules governing overwork. This was the first time the University of Toronto locked out its teaching staff.
- In January 2000, the local engaged in a four-week strike/lockout centred on the issue of tuition fees. While the local was unable to achieve tuition fee waivers or reductions, the actions at the bargaining table and on the picket lines created the political momentum for the major changes that began in 2001. The post-4 fee reduction was a GSU proposal from many years ago. The TA strike improved what the University of Toronto was willing to put in place. As a result of the strike, the University of Toronto introduced the first guaranteed graduate funding in Canada, guaranteed in the Collective Agreement.
- In 2012, members of Unit 4 went on a strike in order to achieve a first Collective Agreement. The strike lasted for four days.
- In 2015, members of Unit 1 went on strike for four weeks. Their demands centred on raising the minimum funding package and tuition relief for upper-year students in research-stream graduate programs who were outside of the funded cohort.

== See also ==
- Coalition of Graduate Employee Unions
- List of graduate student employee unions
