= GSOC =

GSOC may refer to:

- Garda Síochána Ombudsman Commission, investigates complaints against the Irish police
- German Space Operations Center German: Deutsches Raumfahrtkontrollzentrum
- Google Summer of Code
- Graduate Student Organizing Committee, a trade union at New York University
- Grand Slam of Curling
