= Teaching Support Staff Union =

The Teaching Support Staff Union (TSSU) is an independent, non-hierarchical and directly democratic labour union operating at Simon Fraser University in British Columbia, Canada. It represents adjunct labour at the University, including teaching assistants and sessional instructors.

== History ==
One of the TSSU's main logos since 2010

The TSSU began as Local 6 of the Association of University and College Employees (AUCE 6). AUCE was a feminist trade union movement which developed out of the Vancouver Women's Caucus in the late 1960s and early 1970s. Both AUCE rejected the tradition in the Canadian union movement that tended towards hierarchical structure and centralization. It also worked to organize large numbers of women working in underpaid positions, mostly as clerical and teaching support staff. All of the other AUCE unions have joined up with larger unions, such as the Canadian Union of Public Employees (CUPE), but the TSSU has maintained its independent status.

Certified in 1978, the Teaching Support Staff Union represents teaching assistants (TAs), research assistants (RAs), tutor markers (TMs), sessional instructors (SIs) and language instructors (LIs) at Simon Fraser University. Since December 2004, the TSSU has also represents instructors in the English Language and Culture (ELC) and the Interpretation and Translation Program (ITP). The Union functions as the sole bargaining agent for these employees during contract negotiations and represents any and all members in work-related conflicts and problems.

== Independent union structure ==
The TSSU is a grassroots union, which means that it is not governed by any other larger union or umbrella organization. All decisions are made by members, either in General Membership meetings or through the union's many committees. Any individual who has a position in one of bargaining unit categories (e.g. TA, SI, ELC instructor) in the past year is considered a member of the TSSU. There are six Salaried Officers who are part of the larger Executive Committee, which handles the day to day running of the Union. All Executive Officers are also members, which helps make sure that they are in touch with issues of concern to the broader TSSU membership. Executive positions are elected twice a year, and no member is allowed to occupy a position more than two years consecutively; this encourages skills development among a broad portion of the Membership, and helps to prevent the concentration of knowledge in the hands of a few members. The Executive normally meets every two weeks, and meetings are always open to any TSSU member who wishes to attend.

General Membership Meetings (GMs) take place three times every semester and a minimum of 20 members (quorum) must be present before any decisions are made. The Membership has control of the Union resources and must approve the annual budget, financial statements, and most expenditures of the Union. Committees and Executive members make regular reports to the GM and are guided by the motions put forward at these meetings. As well, any member can bring forward a motion at a GM—this motion can be about supporting other social justice organizations, starting a new committee, putting on an event, the possibilities are limitless.

The TSSU is also a founding member of the Coalition of Graduate Employee Unions (CGEU).

== Notable accomplishments ==
The TSSU has successfully bargained for

1. Paid statutory vacation days (such as Victoria Day and Thanksgiving), having attendance at lectures and meetings with a professor about the class count as contract hours (which mean they are paid), and putting in place limits on hours assigned from semester to semester.
2. Accessible washrooms: Originally there were fewer than five accessible washrooms for disabled students on the whole campus. The University's first response was to put up better signage directing people towards those few locations. The Union won the grievance and all washrooms on campus had to be made wheelchair accessible.
3. Creation of the SFU childcare bursary in 1998: This helps pay for childcare for all student members.
4. The creation of sick leave, compassionate leave, family care leave, and work-related travel allowances for all members.
5. The University's 100% coverage of British Columbia's Medical Service Plan (MSP) for all members who sign up, regardless of residential or international status. This right was taken to and won for international students at the Supreme Court of Canada.
6. English Language and Culture/Interpretation and Translation Program/Language Instructors are now able to be members of the TSSU, which means they can now legally bargain for working conditions.
7. The establishment of the Grievance procedure which allows members to have a procedure and external body to consult if there are any issues in regards to pay, contract, or department.
8. The creation of a Centralized Job Posting System.
9. The achievement of one of the strongest and most comprehensive sessional instructor seniority provisions in North America.

== Recent developments ==
The TSSU received the final arbitration result to an 18-month labour dispute on April 21, 2016, with the employer Simon Fraser University. This collective agreement was valid until April 30, 2019.

== See also ==
- Graduate student employee unionization
  - List of graduate student employee unions
