= United Campus Workers of Virginia =

Labor union in Virginia

- Founded: 2020; 6 years ago
- Type: Labor union
- Locations: Virginia; United States
- Website: Official website

United Campus Workers of Virginia (UCWVA) is a labor union in Virginia. It is a local chapter of United Campus Workers, and its parent union is Communications Workers of America. The organization was founded in 2020. It operates in the context of the labor movement in Virginia.

== Scope ==
UCWVA represents university workers in Virginia. Members organized in chapters at University of Virginia and Virginia Commonwealth University by 2022. Chapters formed at other universities thereafter, with Virginia Tech in 2023, the College of William & Mary by 2024, and George Mason University in 2026.

== Activities ==
=== Collective bargaining for university workers ===
Virginia operates with right-to-work law that disallows many groups, including university workers, from using collective bargaining. Consequences of this include that workers may not established unionized workplaces, and unions in Virginia cannot use collection bargaining tactics to negotiate on behalf of union members.

UCWVA advocates for Virginia state legislative change to grant collective bargaining rights to university workers.

=== Lobbying for worker rights ===
UCWVA participates in Lobby day, which is an annual event where citizens can meet their legislators at the Virginia State Capitol.

=== Other demonstrations ===
UCWVA has organized negotiations for higher wages for university workers, particularly student workers.

UCWVA has demonstrated in favor of university hospitals providing access to gender-affirming hormone therapy.

In 2025, University of Virginia president James Edward Ryan resigned following a nationally reported political conflict with the diversity, equity, and inclusion policies of the second Trump administration. In that context, UCWVA organized talks and demonstrations to advocate for university worker rights in the transition to the next president.
