= Graduate Employees' Organization =

US labor union

The Graduate Employees' Organization at UIUC (GEO) is a labor union created to defend and extend the bargaining and employment rights of graduate employees at the University of Illinois Urbana-Champaign (UIUC). Its bargaining unit includes employees classified as teaching assistants, graduate assistants, pre-professional graduate assistants, and research assistants.

The GEO first began organizing at UIUC in the mid-1990s, gaining its first contract with the Board of Trustees (BoT) of the University of Illinois system in 2004.

The members of GEO are committed to the principles of participatory democracy. Their objectives are 1) Organizing, 2) Collective Representation and Bargaining, 3) Education, 4) Community, and 5) Cooperation and Social Justice.

Since 1995, GEO has ratified six employment contracts with the administration at UIUC, with the sixth contract active over 2022–2026.

== Organizational structure ==
GEO is a recognized union affiliated with the Illinois Federation of Teachers (IFT), the American Federation of Teachers (AFT), and the AFL–CIO. The union is organized broadly into two groups: the Coordinating Committee (CC) and the Stewards' Council (SC). The CC is elected by the GEO membership every spring.

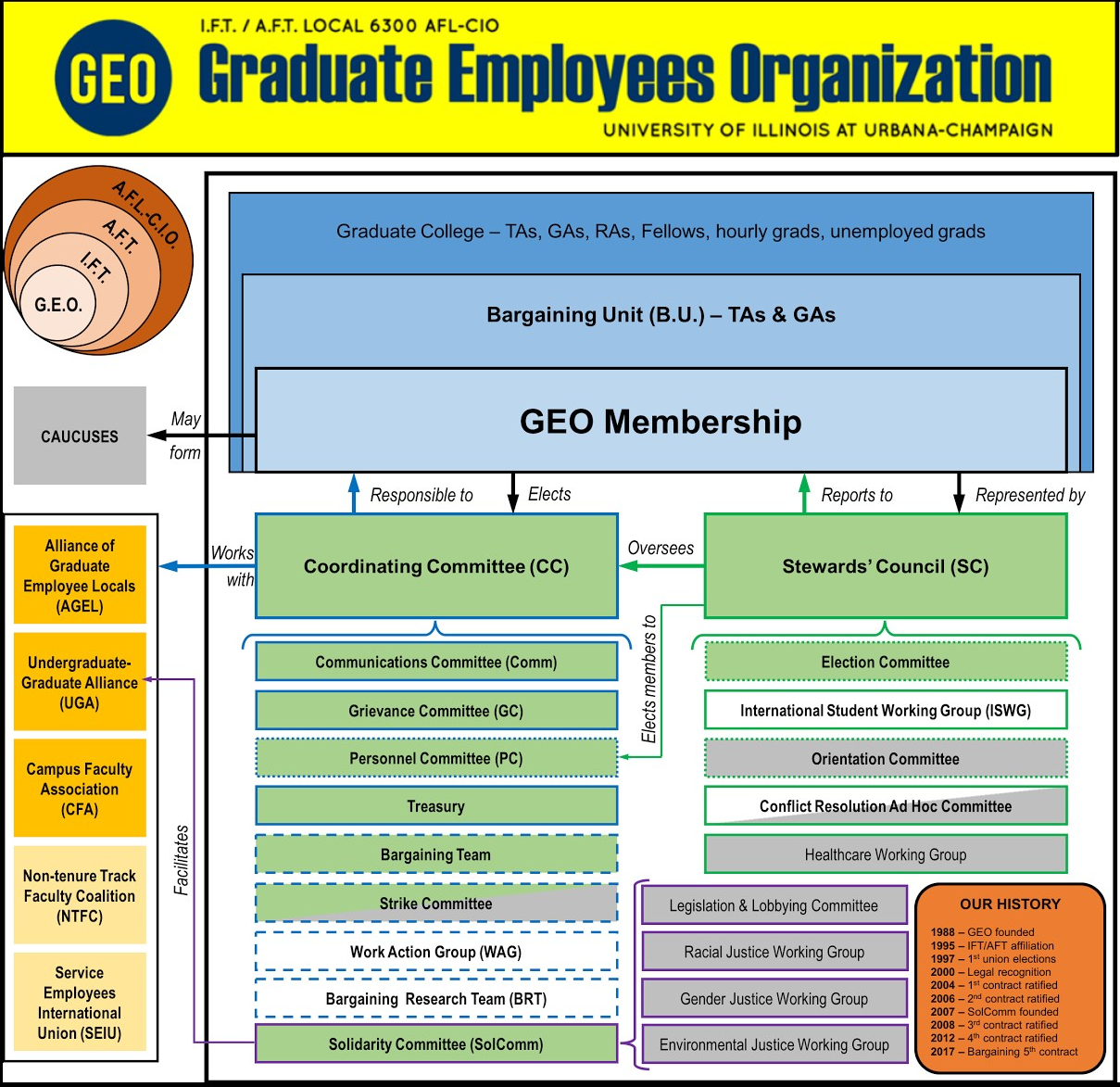
GEO's Organizational Structure

Coordinating Committee (CC)

The CC is made of elected officials from all committees such as the Communications Committee (Comm), the Grievance Committee (GC), the Personnel Committee (PC), Treasurer, the Solidarity Committee, and the Bargaining Team (BT). Some committees like the Work Action Group (WAG) and the Bargaining Research Team (BRT) are temporary, based on GEO's current organizational needs. For example, the Bargaining Team is active only during contract negotiations.

Stewards' Council (SC)

The SC is made up of department representatives who work to advocate on behalf of GEO members. Meeting bi‐weekly, the SC organizes rallies, develops strategies for strengthening the union and increasing membership, and ensures that the union works most efficiently and effectively on behalf of campus workers.

Stemming from the SC are the Election Committee, International Student Working Group (ISWG), Orientation Committee, Conflict Resolution Ad Hoc Committee, and Healthcare Working Group (HWG). As of Spring 2017, the ISWG and HWG were an active group while the Conflict Resolution Ad Hoc Committee was a semi-active group. The Election and Orientation Committees form only as needed, in preparation for and during union elections and University orientation, respectively.

Communications Committee (CommComm)

CommComm is responsible for GEO's communications strategy and oversees external communications. Members create content for, edit, design, and distribute information for the GEO. These communications include the website, social media, orientation materials, mass emails, press releases, t‐shirts, buttons, stickers, and much more.

Grievance Committee (GC)

The GC works to enforce the GEO contract. They are responsible for advocating for fair labor practices at UIUC and protecting graduate employees.

Solidarity Committee (SolComm)

SolComm is committed to working on issues of social justice and supporting them through various means such as financial endorsements, statements of support, and collaborations. To that end, the Solidarity Committee allows the creation of research groups to efficiently strategize around issues of social justice. Groups such as the Environmental Justice Research Group, the Gender Justice Research Group, and the Anti‐Police Brutality Research Group work on these issues and report to the Solidarity Committee.

== History ==
=== The early years ===
Graduate employees have been organizing at UIUC since the early 1970s, when a group called the Assistants Union first worked to improve working conditions. In the late 1980s, the union named themselves the Graduate Employees' Organization (GEO) and got together to voice graduate assistants' concerns over issues such as salaries, workload, and health care, as well as a perceived lack of campus parking. An early victory came when the GEO convinced the administration to delay payment of student fees until the first payday. After initial success, this early GEO became inactive.

In the fall of 1993, a new group of graduate employees began building an active organization with the goal of matching the achievements of unions at the Universities of Michigan and Wisconsin. In the Spring of 1994, the GEO issued a bill of rights and successfully rallied grads against the administration's plan to stop issuing staff ID cards to assistants. With the ID cards, assistants were able to retain many benefits such as staff parking, access to the Illini Credit Union, and state of Illinois employee discounts.

During the 1994–95 academic year, the GEO grew and changed significantly. In the spring of 1995, GEO affiliated with the Illinois Federation of Teachers (IFT), joining over 70,000 Illinois educators in that organization. During the summer of 1995, along with other graduate employee unions in the American Federation of Teachers (AFT), they formed the Alliance of Graduate Employee Locals (AGEL).

=== Securing the right to form a union ===
By April 1996, 3226 graduate assistants had signed cards in support of the GEO's call for a union election. The GEO filed these cards as a petition with the Illinois Educational Labor Relations Board (IELRB) to request a union election. In 1998, the Labor Board reviewed the petition and two of the three members in the committee ruled that graduate assistants would not be considered employees. GEO then appealed this case to the Illinois Court of Appeals.

=== Deciding on the bargaining unit ===
In early March 1999, a student referendum (sponsored by the Illinois Student Government) in support of graduate employees' right to union representation passed with 77% of the vote. At the end of March, 55 graduate employees and supporters (including clergy, union members, and student government leaders) held a 20-hour sit-in at the Board of Trustees office to draw public attention to the administration's policy of non-recognition.

On June 30, 2000, the Illinois Court of Appeals, in a unanimous decision, overturned the IELRB's decision denying graduate employees the right to choose union recognition. Calling the Labor Board's decision "clearly erroneous" and based on an "overly simplistic interpretation" of Illinois educational labor law, the Court sent the case back to the Board for reconsideration. They must now allow "those individuals whose assistantships are not significantly connected to their status as students ... the same statutory right to organize as other educational employees." The IELRB approved preliminary guidelines for who would be allowed to vote in the union election. Graduate students employed as teachers, researchers, or assistants whose employment duties overlapped with their academic discipline were to be excluded.

In early 2002, GEO staged a sit-in at the Swanlund Administration Building. Soon after, the Administration agreed to meet with the union. Provost Richard Herman, accompanied by Deputy University Legal Counsel Steve Veazie, agreed to a series of meetings with GEO representatives to decide on the composition of the bargaining unit. After nearly seven weeks of negotiations, the GEO and university officials were able to come to an agreement on the composition of the bargaining unit.

=== Union election ===
The labor board scheduled the first GEO election for the week before Fall semester final exams: December 3–4, 2002. In a 1188 to 347 decision, graduate students overwhelmingly voted for GEO to represent them at the bargaining table.

=== Expansion of the bargaining unit ===
In 2024, pre-professional graduate assistants voted to join the union. The following year, 35% of research assistants indicated they wanted union representation, triggering an election held by the Illinois Educational Labor Relations Board. After the board certified the results of the successful election, the union and the university reached a tentative agreement to incorporate research assistants into the collective bargaining unit on August 25, 2025.

=== Contracts ===
GEO's first contract spanned from 2003 to 2006. Once this contract ended, in the spring of 2007, GEO ratified their second contract for 2006–2009 with back-pay, a greater subsidy of graduate healthcare, and higher wages.

Bargaining for the third contract began in April 2009. In early November, a strike authorization vote was overwhelmingly passed (92% of 777 votes cast) by members of GEO. More than 1,000 graduate employees and supporters walked picket lines for two days on the Main Quad. GEO then ratified the third contract, which secured tuition waivers for graduate employees.

A few months after the new contract was signed, in the summer of 2010, the College of Fine and Applied Arts (FAA) reduced tuition waivers in five departments (Music, Dance, Theater, Landscape Architecture, and Urban & Regional Planning) from the out-of-state to the in-state rate, a difference of $13,000 per year. The union grieved this violation of the contract with the university administration and filed an unfair labor practice (ULP) with the IELRB. They won a decision from a federal arbitrator in September 2011. On November 15, 2012, the IELRB ruled in favor of the GEO, finding that the UIUC administration engaged in an unfair labor practice with regard to the reduction in tuition waivers and failure to comply with the arbitrator's ruling.

Bargaining for the fourth contract began on April 13, 2012. After several months of no resolution, GEO passed a strike authorization vote by 87%. On November 27, 2012, the administration and GEO signed a tentative agreement and GEO ratified this contract with a 95% vote of approval.

In 2018, the GEO went on a 12-day strike, the longest of the organization's history at the time. Ultimately the GEO secured a contract with 98% of members voting in favor on March 9, 2018. The contract was effective from August 16, 2017, to August 15, 2022.

On March 28, 2023, the GEO ratified a new contract with 98% of members voting in favor. The contract is effective August 16, 2022 through August 15, 2026.
