= Indiana Graduate Workers Coalition =

American graduate student group

Indiana Graduate Workers Coalition (IGWC) is a multidisciplinary students' group consisting of graduate students working as teaching and research assistants at Indiana University, Bloomington campus. The group describes itself as graduate workers fighting for better working conditions for graduate student workers at IU Bloomington".

== Origins ==
The coalition was first formed informally in 2018 after participating in the nationwide graduate student walk out protest that was led by the students in the US protesting against the gun violence. IGWC was subsequently, officially launched in September 2019 with a mission to fight for better working conditions for graduate student workers on IU Bloomington campus.

== Protest against fee hikes ==
IGWC has consistently demanded for mandatory fee waivers and increased stipends for all graduate student workers including international students enrolled in the university. According to the group, the fees have increased since 2011 but the stipend has remained the same.

=== 2019 ===
The group first demanded for a fee waiver in 2019 of the mandatory fees imposed by the university. Graduate students often work as teaching or research assistants while earning their degrees, and their compensation typically includes tuition remission and a stipend. But IU's graduate students are still required to pay certain fees each semester. The mandatory fees include the technology fee, the repair and rehabilitation fee, the activity fee, the transportation fee, and the health fee amounting to almost $700 per semester. The group also calculated that graduate student workers also end up paying 8% of their income back to their universities further straining their finances. The group has also demanded for a hike in the stipends stating that the student workers receive $15,750 which is less than what is required even by IU Bloomington's estimates ($22 426). The coalition was able to garner support in the form of 1200 signatures for their petition.

=== 2021 ===
In 2021, frustrated by inaction of IU Bloomington management, IGWC embarked on a fee strike against the mandatory fees amounting to about $700 per semester and demanded that they be waived off for graduate student workers at the university in the pandemic-hit semester.

== Other issues ==
IGWC also came out in support of the plight of international students when the U.S. Immigration and Customs Enforcement (ICE) announced modifications to temporary exemptions for non-immigrant students taking online courses for the Fall 2020 semester due to COVID-19. According to the modifications, non-immigrant F-1 and M-1 students couldn't take all their classes online for the Fall 2020 semester if they wanted to remain in the United States. Otherwise, the students faced the risk of deportation. The group that the university step up to ensure international students did not lose their visa status amidst a pandemic.
