= Labor movement in Virginia =

The labor movement in Virginia includes all aspects of the labour movement in the United States' Commonwealth of Virginia.

== Labor law in Virginia ==
Virginia adopted a right-to-work law in 1947 at the time of the Taft–Hartley Act. Right-to-work laws make paying union dues optional as a condition of employment at any unionized workplace. In 2026, Virginia passed law that state minimum wage would be raised to US$15/hour by 2028. In May 2026, Democratic governor Abigail Spanberger broke a campaign pledge by vetoing a law which would have allowed public employees to collectively bargain working conditions, wages. Her veto drew severe criticism from unions and other workers' rights advocates.

== Labor protests ==
One of the earliest recorded worker protests in North America was in Virginia in 1619 when the Jamestown Polish craftsmen went on strike after being denied the right to vote due to their Polish heritage.

In 1888 unionized workers organized a boycott of the Baughman Brothers' company, which was a printer in Virginia.

The Pittston Coal strike was 1989-90 strike by United Mine Workers of America against the Pittston Coal Company after the company terminated health benefits. Most of the workers were in Virginia.

The 2019 Virginia teachers' walkout was a teachers' strike in the context of 2018–2019 education workers' strikes in the United States. The strike ended with Virginia legislators granting educators a pay raise.

== Culture of labor organizing ==
In 1913, the Virginia Federation of Labor permitted black people to attend the state workers convention for the first time. Most of Virginia's best established unions practiced racial segregation, only allowing white people to participate in labor organizing, and as a response to this, they left the federation. Within a few years, the black people were prohibited, and some white groups rejoined.
