= Illinois Educational Labor Relations Board =

Illinois state agency

Agency overview
- Formed: 1983
- Jurisdiction: State of Illinois
- Headquarters: Springfield, Illinois
- Website: Welcome - www.illinois.gov/elrb

The Illinois Educational Labor Relations Board (IELRB) is a State agency that administers the Illinois Educational Labor Relations Act, the Act that governs relations between Illinois educational employees on the one hand, and Illinois school boards and school systems on the other.

== Description ==
The IELRB, a five-member board that was created in 1983, views Illinois school boards and full-time educational employees as its stakeholders. The group of educational employees who are Board stakeholders is not limited to certified teachers; it also includes a wide variety of non-instructional school personnel. However, this employee group specifically excludes supervisory and managerial personnel, student employees, temporary school employees, and part-time school employees. As the State's educational labor relations panel, the IELRB is a permanent, standing arbitration board between school boards and administrators on the one hand, and educational employees (including unionized employees) on the other. Public-sector workers outside of school systems are stakeholders in a separate state of Illinois panel, the Illinois Labor Relations Board (ILRB).

=== Controversies ===
During the COVID-19 pandemic, discussions arose in all 50 U.S. states over the level of pandemic precautions that could be required and mandated in public school systems. In Illinois, this became an issue over which the IELRB had jurisdiction.

=== Statutory law ===
The IELRB operates pursuant to the Illinois Educational Labor Relations Act, which is cited in the Illinois Compiled Statutes as 115 ILCS 5.
