= Harvard Graduate Students Union =

Labor union representing graduate students and researchers at Harvard

- Harvard Graduate Students Union- United Auto Workers Local 5118
- Abbreviation: HGSU-UAW
- Formation: 2015; 11 years ago
- Type: Graduate student union
- Purpose: Representing Harvard University staff
- Headquarters: 552 Massachusetts Avenue, Suite 209; Cambridge, Massachusetts 02139
- Coordinates: 42.3643646°N 71.1052512°W
- Members: 5,000
- President: sara speller
- Trustee: Natalie Caputo
- Key people: Sudipta Saha, Simon Warchol, Kevin Kapner, Rachel Petherbridge, & Georgia Dittemore
- Subsidiaries: Harvard Undergraduate Workers Union
- Affiliations: United Auto Workers
- Website: harvardgradunion.org

The Harvard Graduate Students Union (HGSU), officially known as Harvard Graduate Students Union United Auto Workers (HGSU-UAW Local #5118), is a labor union representing graduate students, teaching assistants, course assistants, and other student employees at Harvard University. The bargaining unit comprises about 5,000 student employees, including graduate students working as research assistants and teaching fellows as well as several hundred undergraduate students that hold teaching positions. Contract negotiations for their 3rd bargaining agreement with the university have been ongoing since February 2025. HGSU's parent union is the United Auto Workers labor union, whose 400,000 members include 45,000 graduate students and 30,000 academic workers.

== History ==
A group of graduate students began a union organizing campaign in Spring 2015. By February 2016, union organizers calling themselves the Harvard Graduate Student Union-United Auto Workers claimed to have collected election authorization cards from over 60% of graduate students. In August 2016, the National Labor Relations Board (NLRB) overturned previous precedent since 2004 that graduate students at private universities were not employees with collective bargaining rights. Following this decision, HGSU organizers petitioned for a union representation election to be held.

In October 2016, union organizers and the university announced that a two-day, secret ballot election on union representation would take place on November 16–17 of that year. In the 2016 election, 1,274 voters cast ballots favoring unionization and 1,456 opposed unionization, with 314 ballots challenged on eligibility grounds. The NLRB ultimately overturned the results of that election and ordered a new election, finding that the university failed to furnish an accurate list of eligible voters. The second election was held in April 2018. On April 20, the NLRB announced the results of the two day election, reporting 1,931 votes (56%) in favor to 1,523 opposed. In the second election, 70% of eligible voters cast a ballot. In May 2018, Harvard University announced that it would recognize the union and enter into contract negotiations in good faith.

The union and university administrators held their first bargaining session in October 2018. On May 1, 2019, about 30 union members held a sit-in and others marched in support of union demands regarding wages, health care, and protections against sexual harassment. In July 2019, more than 300 union members signed a letter threatening to hold a strike authorization vote if negotiations did not make progress. In late October, after a two-week voting period, about 2500 graduate students voted to authorize the bargaining committee to call a strike, with 90.4% of votes cast favoring strike authorization.

HGSU-UAW went out on strike for the first time on December 3, 2019, citing (among other issues) the need for stronger protections against sexual harassment and discrimination, improved compensation, and more affordable and comprehensive healthcare (especially mental health and dental care). The strike ended on January 1, 2020. In July 2020, HGSU-UAW and the university administration agreed on a one-year contract. In November 2021, union members ratified a new four-year contract, effective November 27, 2021 that ended June 30, 2025. Shortly after this contract expired, nearly 1,000 members were carved out from the contract, stripping them of their access to Union rights as part of a longer trajectory of union-busting on the University campus.

Since April 21, 2026, HGSU members have been on strike from their teaching and research labor, after holding a strike authorization vote where 95.8% of voting members voted in favor of going on strike. Membership decided to strike because the University administration has not made meaningful movement on HGSU's key contract demands of pay equity, expanded benefit funds, non-citizen worker protections, and stronger protocols to protect against harassment and discrimination.

== See Also ==
- Student Researchers United-UAW - UC Berkeley student union affiliated with UAW
