= Local 33–UNITE HERE =

Labor union for Yale University graduate students

Local 33–UNITE HERE, formerly the Graduate Employees and Students Organization (“GESO–UNITE HERE”), is a union of graduate student teachers and researchers at Yale University in New Haven, Connecticut.

Local 33 is affiliated with the international union UNITE HERE, which also represents Yale University's service, maintenance, clerical, and technical workers. After more than three decades of organizing, Yale graduate workers submitted over 3,000 signed union authorization cards to the Hartford, Connecticut, office of the National Labor Relations Board, or NLRB, representing the greatest number of graduate workers who have ever supported unionizing. On January 9, 2023, Yale graduate workers won their union, with 1,860 members voting in favor and 179 voting against, a 10.4 to 1 ratio in favor of unionization. The proposed worker bargaining unit of about 4,000 graduate and professional school workers was the second largest election filing in the country in 2022.

Local 33 has received support from many prominent academics, including Corey Robin, Michael Denning, David Graeber, and Michael Bérubé, and elected officials, including Governor Dannel Malloy, Senators Richard Blumenthal and Chris Murphy, New Haven Mayor Toni Harp, US Senator Bernie Sanders, and US Congresswoman Rosa DeLauro.

== History ==
In 2014, Local 33 took its campaign public at a rally on October 21, unveiling a petition with the photographs of over 1000 graduate students calling on Yale to negotiate the terms of a neutral election. Local 33 is asking Yale to address four main issues: fairness in teaching and funding; mental healthcare for graduate students; racial and gender equity; and affordable childcare.

On August 29, 2016, following the NLRB's decision in Columbia, Local 33 members in 10 academic departments filed election petitions with the NLRB.

On January 25, 2017, the Regional Director for Region 1 of the National Labor Relations Board ordered union elections for graduate teachers in the Departments of East Asian Languages and Literatures, English, Geology and Geophysics, History, History of Art, Math, Physics, Political Science, and Sociology.

== Activities ==
In 2012, GESO hosted a conference on academic labor entitled, "The Changing University: An Interdisciplinary Symposium". In 2014, GESO re-emerged with two "majority petition" rallies. The first, held on April 30, presented a petition to the Yale administration with over 1000 signatures of graduate students. The second, on October 21, 2014, presented a petition with over 1000 photographs of graduate students paired with allies from the local unions, the community, and elected officials, including Governor Dannel Malloy, New Haven Mayor Toni Harp, and US Congresswoman Rosa DeLauro. In February 2015, GESO released a report on the expansion of Yale College, entitled "Teaching in a Growing Yale: Critical Questions." GESO presented a petition with over 1100 signatures to the university in May 2015. The petition calls on Yale to "begin contract negotiations on issues of immediate concern including funding security, racial and gender equity, and mental health care."

== See also ==
- List of graduate student employee unions
