= Coalition of Graduate Employee Unions =

CGEU
- Coalition of Graduate Employee Unions
- Founded: 1992
- Location: United States, Canada
- Members: 51 unions
- Affiliations: Various

The Coalition of Graduate Employee Unions (CGEU) was re-founded as the Coalition of Student Employee Unions (CSEU/CSEE) in 2020 to reflect the broader membership of student employees (rather than the more narrow "graduate employees").

The Coalition of Graduate Employee Unions consisted of unions representing graduate employees (also known as academic student employees or ASEs) at universities in Canada and the United States. The CGEU formed in 1992 and each year it organized an annual conference where representatives from graduate employee unions came together to teach and learn about organizing, negotiating, tactics, and mobilizing members. In past conferences, the delegates spent part of one of the days on the picket line in solidarity with a group of striking workers in the city hosting the conference, but this did not occur in more recent years. In the period between conferences, the CGEU provided a forum for graduate employee unions to share information with each other, and maintained a website with information about graduate employee organizing.

The CGEU was made up of locals from many different international unions, including: the American Federation of Teachers, the United Auto Workers, the Communication Workers of America, UNITE HERE, United Electrical Workers, National Education Association, American Association of University Professors, the Service Employees International Union and the Canadian Union of Public Employees, as well as some independent unions.

== Conferences ==
The 16th annual CGEU conference took place in the summer of 2007 in Amherst, Massachusetts and was hosted by GEO/UAW.

The 21st annual CGEU conference took place in the summer of 2012 in Vancouver, BC and was hosted by CUPE 2278 and the Teaching Support Staff Union.

The 22nd annual CGEU conference took place in the summer of 2013 in Iowa City, IA and was hosted by COGS.

The 23rd annual CGEU conference took place in the summer of 2014 in Montreal, QC and was hosted by AGSEM.

The 24th annual CGEU conference took place on August 5–8, 2015, in Amherst, MA and was hosted by Graduate Employee Organization (GEO) at University of Massachusetts-Amherst.

The 25th annual CGEU conference will take place on August 13–16, 2016, in Los Angeles, to be hosted by UC Student-Workers Union (UAW 2865) at University of California, Los Angeles.

== See also ==
- List of graduate student employee unions
- National Labor Relations Act
- Rand formula
- 2011 Wisconsin protests - initiated by the Teaching Assistants' Association (TAA)
- 2012 Quebec student protests
- 2009 California college tuition hike protests
