= Graduate Employees' Organization 3550 =

Michigan graduate student union

- Formation: April 15, 1974
- Purpose: Our mission is to represent, advocate for, and organize graduate student workers and to build collective power in the pursuit of social & economic justice.
- Headquarters: Ann Arbor, MI
- Parent organization: American Federation of Teachers
- Website: geo3550.org

Graduate Employees' Organization 3550 (GEO 3550) is a labor union representing the over 2,000 Graduate Student Instructors (GSIs) and Graduate Student Staff Assistants (GSSAs) on the three campuses that make up the University of Michigan (U-M).

Organizing for a graduate student union at U-M began in the 1970s. They were first certified as the official union representing GSIs, GSSAs, and Graduate Student Research Assistants (GSRAs) at U-M on April 15, 1974, and they won their first contract the next year. GEO 3550 is one of the oldest graduate student unions in the United States. GEO 3550 is affiliated with the Michigan and American Federation of Teachers (AFT) and, through AFT, with the American Federation of Labor and Congress of Industrial Organizations (AFL-CIO).

GEO 3550's "mission is to represent, advocate for, and organize graduate student workers and to build collective power in the pursuit of social & economic justice." In 2019, the union's Steward's Council adopted the following nine guiding principals: Represent, Advocate For, Organize, Collective Bargaining, Democracy, Social Justice, Solidarity, Community, Education & Research.

GEO 3550 has been actively negotiating contracts since their first contract in 1975.

== Organization ==
=== Union structure ===
According to the GEO 3550 constitution, all graduate students at U-M are eligible to become members of the union, and all union decisions besides those enumerated in the constitution are to be made by the membership. Although all graduate students are eligible to become members of the union, the union's bargaining unit is composed of only those graduate students who are actively employed as GSIs or GSSAs.

The union's constitutional officers include a President, a vice-president, a Secretary, and a Treasurer, all of whom are elected every year by a majority vote at a general membership meeting. The union also has a Steward's Council, composed of department-level representatives, which exists "to oversee the implementation of Organizational policy as directed by the membership."

The Steward's Council is also empowered to both create and dissolve standing committees by majority vote. The examples of standing committees are:

- Financial Committee: The only committee chaired by a constitutional officer, the Treasurer, Financial Committee oversees union spending and financial policy.
- Grievance Committee: Grievance Committee works with members in navigating the grievance process outlined in the union contract to resolve workplace issues.
- Contract Committee: Contract Committee oversees the implementation of new contracts, education around members' contractual rights and benefits, the development of the union's bargaining platform, and the actual bargaining over new contracts.
- Solidarity and Political Action Committee: Solidarity and Political Action Committee manages the union's relationships with other labor unions and community organizations, organizes member support for solidarity campaigns, and presents recommendations for union endorsements in local electoral campaigns.

Union members also maintain several caucuses that organize around specific issues. Some examples of caucuses include the BIPOC Caucus, the International GSI Caucus, the Feminist Caucus, the Housing Caucus, the Climate Caucus, and the Abolition Caucus.

=== Contract cycles ===
GEO 3550 operates on a three-year contract cycle. The first year after winning a new contract is considered an enforcement year, when the union focuses on enforcing contract wins through grievance procedures and member education. The second year is considered a platform development year, when the union focuses on surveying member needs and priorities, and drafts new contract language to try and incorporate into the next contract. The third year is considered a bargaining year, when the union focuses on bargaining with the university's human resources representatives for a new contract.

== History ==
=== Early organizing efforts ===
Graduate students at the University of Michigan first threatened to form a labor union in 1966. At the time, the university employed about 900 "teaching fellows" (now GSIs) who were paid $2,400 per academic year. On April 10, 1966, a group of teaching fellows met with Allan F. Smith, the university's vice president for academic affairs, to demand a $1,200 raise, better communication with university administration, smaller class sizes, tuition relief. If their demands were not met, the teaching fellows threatened to affiliate with the American Federation of Teachers. However, it was not until 1970 that U-M teaching fellows first petitioned the Michigan Employment Relations Commission (MERC) for a union election. This first effort was struck down, however, when MERC issued a decision agreeing with university administrators that, if teaching fellows were to be considered employees, they would have to be part of a unit alongside GSSAs and GSRAs. Rather than taking the decision to court, the teaching fellows decided to stop pursuing their unionization efforts.

Unionization efforts for graduate students at U-M did not pick up again until 1973 in response to several administration decisions including a 24% tuition increase. The tuition hike sparked a period of intense student organizing at the university with at least 3,000 students signing a tuition strike pledge started by the Student Action Committee and supported by the Student Government Council. The response by graduate students was the formation of the Organization of Teaching Fellows (OTF), who casually affiliated themselves with the American Association of University Professors (AAUP). After a pay increase averted a potential strike, teaching fellows continued to organize and joined the university's GSRAs and GSSAs to form GEO and officially request a MERC election for the second time in their history. This time, the university agreed to a union election, and GEO was certified as the university's union for "Graduate Student Assistants" on April 15, 1974, by a vote of 807–424.

=== Fight for a first contract (1974–1976) ===
Negotiations between GEO and U-M for the union's first contract began in June 1974. An early point of contention in the bargaining process was an 8% raise given to faculty but not teaching fellows despite promises made by the university. After delivering the raise to faculty, the university specified that they would only give the raise to teaching fellows if they dropped all other economic demands. This would have meant abandoning demands for equal pay for GSRAs and GSSAs, tuition waivers, and the standardization of wages across the university. GEO threatened to file an unfair labor charge against the university with MERC, but Vice President for Academic Affairs Allan F. Smith claimed U-M was justified in going back on its promise because the promise had been made before the union was certified. By November, GEO and the university were still far from reaching an agreement. In response to GEO's demand of an immediate 25% raise, the university offered an 8% raise over two years. In response to GEO's demand for tuition waivers for all graduate employees, the university offered to allow those currently paying out-of-state tuition to pay the lower in-state tuition. When the two parties still had not reached an agreement by February 1975, members voted 689–193 to authorize a strike. The strike continued until March 14, with graduate students initially picketing classroom buildings before shifting focus to blocking deliveries at service buildings as the number of students and faculty crossing the picket lines gradually increased as the strike wore on. The agreement, finalized through mediation with the MERC-appointed fact finder Patrick McDonald, included compromises on several GEO demands:

- An immediate 8% raise retroactive to September followed by a 5.6% raise for the fall semester
- A tuition freeze at $440/semester
- Establishment of a union shop, meaning all graduate employees represented by the university were required to pay dues regardless of membership status, starting a year after the contract went into effect
- Implementation of affirmative action in hiring
- A non-discrimination clause that included not only race, creed, color and sex, but also sexual orientation and disability, rare additions at the time
- The ability to file grievances for more pay when a graduate student works in excess of their contracted hours
- A guarantee from the university to not retaliate against GEO's members and supporters for participation in the strike

Effects of the 1975 strike reverberated out into the wider Ann Arbor community, even influencing local legislation proposals. In March of that year, the Human Rights Party included the repeal of the law that criminalized disobeying a police officer's orders as part of its broader police reforms after several GEO members were arrested under that charge during the strike.

Just months after the first contract went into effect, GEO members raised alarms about the university's handling of its obligation to implement affirmative action in hiring that would foreshadow the difficult negotiations it would undertake the next year for its second contract. GEO had found that the university was labeling all racial minority and international students as "minorities" in order to inflate the number of minority employees presented by the university. GEO claimed that this violated both the agreement in their contract that required a breakdown of racial demographics into "Black, Asian, Native American, Chicano and other Spanish Surnamed" as well as then-president Robben Wright Fleming's directive in the university's 1973 affirmative action report to the United States Department of Health, Education, and Welfare. GEO also claimed that the university violated the spirit of their agreement by not incorporating recruitment into their affirmative action efforts.

In an effort to give stability to the union, whose members frequently changed as new students enrolled and senior students graduated, 58% of voting GEO members decided on February 19, 1976, to accept the union's executive committee's recommendation to affiliate with the American Federation of Teachers.

=== The student-employee question (1976–1981) ===
Disagreements over affirmative action and non-discrimination protections plagued the negotiations over GEO's second contract that began in 1976. Although GEO pushed for the university to initiate recruitment efforts of women and minority students to fulfill the commitment to affirmative action made by the university in its first contract with the union, U-M negotiators maintained that they were only bound by federal requirements to collect data. With the second contract, the university also tried to revise the non-discrimination clause it had agreed to by getting rid of the specifically cited protected categories and replacing it with a blanket statement stating that its "departments will not discriminate against employees based on factors not specifically mentioned unless the University decides a certain factor interferes with job performance."

As the union and the university entered a stalemate in their bargaining sessions, GEO was also unable to tip the scales in their favor through a work stoppage like they had in 1975. On October 27, the union initiated a strike vote amongst its membership, but at the same time that membership voted in favor of sending out the strike ballots they also voted in favor of requiring a two-thirds majority as well as a minimum of 660 "yes" votes in order to trigger a strike instead of the constitutionally-required simple majority of those who vote. Ultimately, the strike vote failed and the union returned to the bargaining table.

When the union returned to the bargaining table and attempted to accept the compromise of the university's previous offer, the university refused to sign the agreement until GEO dropped two outstanding grievances. In November, GEO filed an unfair labor practices charge against the university. As the stalemate deepened, GEO made a second unsuccessful effort to launch a strike in March 1977 and also began a campaign to have the university regents make the university's representatives resume negotiations.

Although an August 19 ruling found the university guilty of an unfair labor practice for not signing a contract with GEO, the university decided to appeal the decision with the intent to shift focus onto the question of whether graduate assistants were students or employees. The university had attempted to enter evidence into consideration that graduate assistants were students, not employees, during the original unfair labor practice trial, but the MERC administrative judge handling the case, Shlomo Sperka, would not admit the evidence because of his belief that the student-employee question had been decided by the 1973 Michigan Supreme Court decision that ruled that interns and residents at the U-M hospital were simultaneously both and therefore eligible to organize a labor union. GEO hoped the regents would intervene to prevent an appeal, but on September 16 the regents voted 5–3 to approve the appeal.

In January 1978, MERC stated that it could not consider U-M's appeal of the unfair labor practice decision until evidence was heard regarding the student-employee question and ordered Judge Sperka to begin hearing testimony on the issue. Faced with a decision between challenging the MERC order and taking the issue to the Michigan State Court of Appeals where the applicability of the 1973 intern/resident decision to graduate students would be debated, or arguing the issue directly with the MERC judge, GEO decided go forward with the MERC order. The student-employee question would go on to dominate nearly a half-decade of GEO's history.

During the trial, which began in May 1978 and would not conclude until November 1981, both the union and the university called witnesses and submitted evidence to support their positions with the former arguing that graduate assistants were employees and the latter that they were students. Early in the trial, the Senate Advisory Committee on University Affairs (SACUA), the executive committee of the university's faculty senate, took the side of U-M in arguing that graduate assistants were students, not employees, and attempted to submit a statement to that effect that was rejected by Judge Sperka as irrelevant to the case. The primary reason for the faculty members' position against graduate assistants being employees was that such a decision would imply that professors were supervisors, and the members of SACUA believed the employee-supervisor relationship would damage the traditional student-professor relationship.

Then-president Robben Wright Fleming also testified against GEO during the trial. Fleming's testimony against considering graduate assistants to be employees focused on his claim that he received frequent complaints about the university's decision to rely so heavily on the use of GSIs instead of professors. During his testimony, Fleming said the university's use of GSIs was "the biggest single criticism [he's] heard of the University," but that he defends the decision by saying the teaching experience is part of graduate students' education.

GEO's defense focused on calling graduate assistants as witnesses and highlighting the similarities between the work performed by graduate assistants and that performed by professors.

Throughout the trial, GEO was plagued by high turnover and low membership. On September 5, GEO President Mike Clark resigned from his position, citing overwork as the main reason, and when the union sent ballots out to all GEO members to elect a new president there were only about 150 members on the books.

On July 14, 1980, Judge Sperka ruled that GSIs and GSSAs qualified as employees but that GSRAs did not. This time, both U-M and GEO appealed the decision, with U-M still aiming to disqualify all graduate assistants from employment status and GEO now aiming to restore GSRAs to employee status.

In early November 1981, MERC reaffirmed the earlier decision that GSIs and GSSAs were employees but GSRAs were not, and it also ordered the university to abide by the contract that had been arrived at in 1976 before the legal disputes began. On November 20, then-president Harold Tafler Shapiro announced the university would not appeal the latest MERC decision, and Assistant University Personnel Director John Forsyth signed the old 1976 contract on behalf of the university on November 23, finally giving GEO a second contract after 5 years of operating without one.

=== Internal divisions and back to the bargaining table (1981–1983) ===
As GEO went back to the bargaining table with the university for the first time following its lengthy legal battle, the union was plagued by low membership and internal divisions that at least partly resulted from the half-decade of operating with no contract for graduate assistants.

By the spring of 1982, GEO had proposed a contract that included, among other items, a nearly $2,000 salary increase, the equalizing of salaries between staff assistants and library assistants, full tuition waivers, in-state tuition for family members of GEO members, the establishment of caps on class sizes, training for GSIs, and the creation of committees involving GEO to ensure the university would meet its affirmative action goals. By July, the bargaining team had reached a tentative agreement with the university on a new contract that included advances on some of the university's priorities, and union officials were optimistic about the membership officially approving the contract.

However, it quickly became clear that union officials' optimism was misplaced. At one meeting in the fall of 1982 GEO members voted against recommending approval of the contract, citing insufficient raises given that wages had not kept up with inflation during the five year legal battle between the university and the union as well as a refusal by the university to move on affirmative action and class size caps. Internal divisions led to a proliferation of op-eds in the student newspaper The Michigan Daily both in favor of and opposed to the new contract proposal. When the October 27th deadline for voting on the new contract came and passed, GEO had not yet received enough votes to finalize the ballots with only about 40% of members having voted instead of the 50% required to call the vote. Given the low turnout, union officials decided to extend the vote through October 30. Ultimately, members voted down the proposal.

GEO members decided to elect a new bargaining committee to replace the one that had produced the rejected contract proposal, and a temporary agreement between the union and the university in the fall of 1982 allowed graduate assistants to receive a raise and increased tuition waiver as contract negotiations continued. It wasn't until the fall of 1983 that the new bargaining team reached an agreement with the university and the membership narrowly voted to approve the one-year contract, which included a 5.1% raise, a tuition reduction of about 7%, and an encouragement but not a requirement for departments to establish class size caps.

=== Problems in Washington and rebuilding the union (1983–1985) ===
Although the union had settled its new contract, GEO soon ran into new problems when Congress allowed the bill that made tuition waivers tax exempt to expire in December 1983. The union claimed that the resulting increase in graduate assistants tax withholding amounted to between a $75 and $100 per month pay cut. The union attempted to reopen negotiations with the university, claiming that the tax hike effectively violated the raises guaranteed in their new contract, but they met resistance from the university. On March 22, 1984, the union announced that it would file a grievance against the university to have the additional taxes returned to graduate assistants. To counter, the university offered to provide students with emergency $750 loans. In April, GEO publicized an IRS document that they claimed indicated the university was not obligated to implement the tax on tuition waivers, and they also claimed that U-M was the only university to have actually implemented it. The situation was finally resolved after US President Ronald Reagan signed the tax exemption of tuition waivers back into law on October 31. In response, the university announced it would return taxes withheld on tuition waivers to graduate students, but GEO members raised concerns that the bill signed by Reagan was only a temporary fix that left graduate students vulnerable to future loss of tax exempt status.

During the same period, GEO also began to try and enforce the closed shop clause it had won in its first contract back in 1976 for the first time. The lengthy legal battle with the university and a lackluster campaign for a second contract had left GEO with low membership and a depleted budget. In the fall semester of the 1983–1984 school year, only 637 of the 1,700 GSIs and GSSAs at U-M were union members, and less than two-thirds of non-members were paying the agency fees required by the closed shop clause. For the first time in its existence, GEO sent warnings to non-members who had not paid their agency fees in February 1984 that they could face termination proceedings if they did not pay the fees. However, this push to collect delinquent agency fees met resistance from some non-members who attempted to organize a petition to have GEO switch to an open shop contract so they would not be required to pay fees for a union in which they were not members. Petitioners argued that open shop policies were common at many businesses, that there not really any benefits to having a union because it was in the university's interest to offer competitive funding packages to attract students, and even that the MERC decision labelling GSIs and GSSAs "employees" was incorrect because their positions were part of their training and financial aid. GEO disagreed with the argument that graduate students would have the same benefits without their advocacy, arguing that even if the university claimed they were not employees, they treated graduate assistants as employees in trying to extract as much labor as possible for the least amount of money. GEO also emphasized the importance of dues and agency fees in maintaining their affiliation with the Michigan and American Federations of Teachers in order to have access to resources like the lawyer who represented the union during their legal battle with the university.

Ultimately, the petition drive to change the GEO contract to an open shop failed because, while the National Labor Relations Act (NLRA) allowed workers to petition to have their union change their contract at any time, as public employees the U-M graduate assistants fell under the jurisdiction of the Michigan Labor Relations Act (MLRA), which only allowed such petitions once the existing contract had expired. However, the union faced further difficulties in collecting their agency fees when the university claimed in April 1984 that the warning letters they sent to delinquent non-members were form letters instead of individual notices.

=== 2020 strike ===
On September 3, 2020, following several months of advocating for a series of demands related to the COVID-19 pandemic and campus police, GEO 3550 issued strike authorization ballot to its members. The ballot was approved by membership, and the work stoppage officially began on September 8.

The strike was the result of disagreements over the University of Michigan's pandemic response measures. GEO 3550 claimed the university's response was insufficient and demanded a series of policies including the right to work remotely, the extension of the graduate student childcare subsidy to unlicensed providers, the maintenance of healthcare coverage for students on leaves of absences at no extra cost, better support for international students at the university's International Center, degree timeline/funding extensions, and a $2,500 unconditional emergency grant. In response, the university insisted that a strike violated the "No Interference" article of GEO 3550's contract as well as Michigan's Public Employment Relations Act of 1947, which prohibits public employees from going on strike.

After GEO 3550 members re-authorized the strike for a second week, U-M President Mark Schlissel announced on September 13 that the university was seeking a temporary restraining order and preliminary injunction against the labor union in the Washtenaw County Circuit Court in an attempt to bring the strike to a halt. GEO 3550 members had rejected the university's first offer in the first week of the strike, but the work stoppage officially ended on September 16 after members voted to accept the university's second offer.
