= Teaching Assistants Association =

Wisconsin graduate student employee union

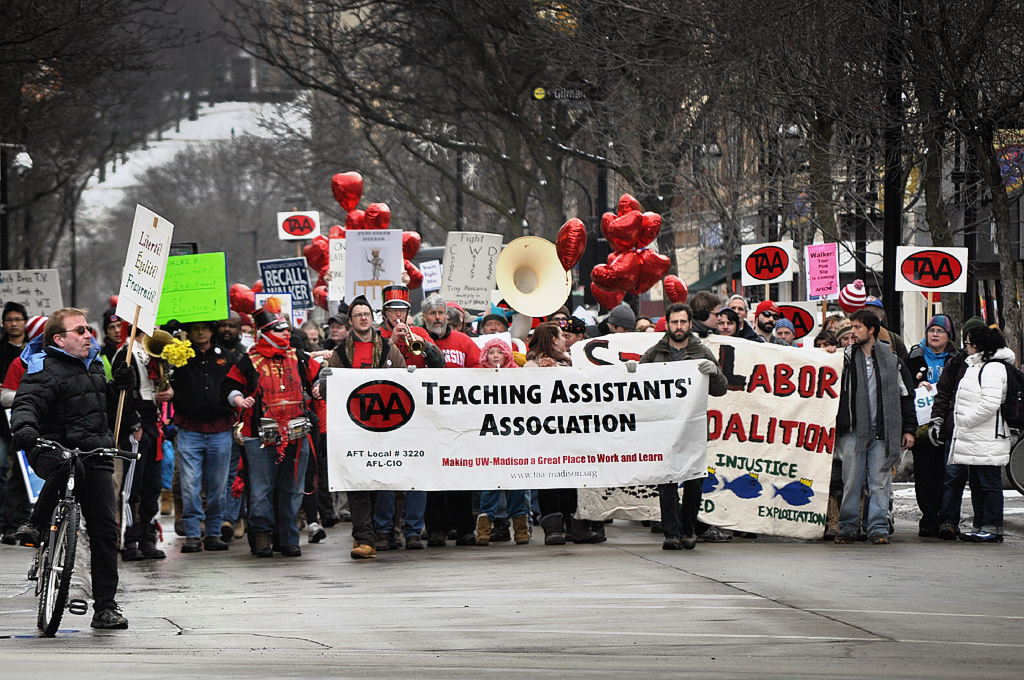
The Teaching Assistants Association (TAA) marching down State Street in downtown Madison, February 14, 2012

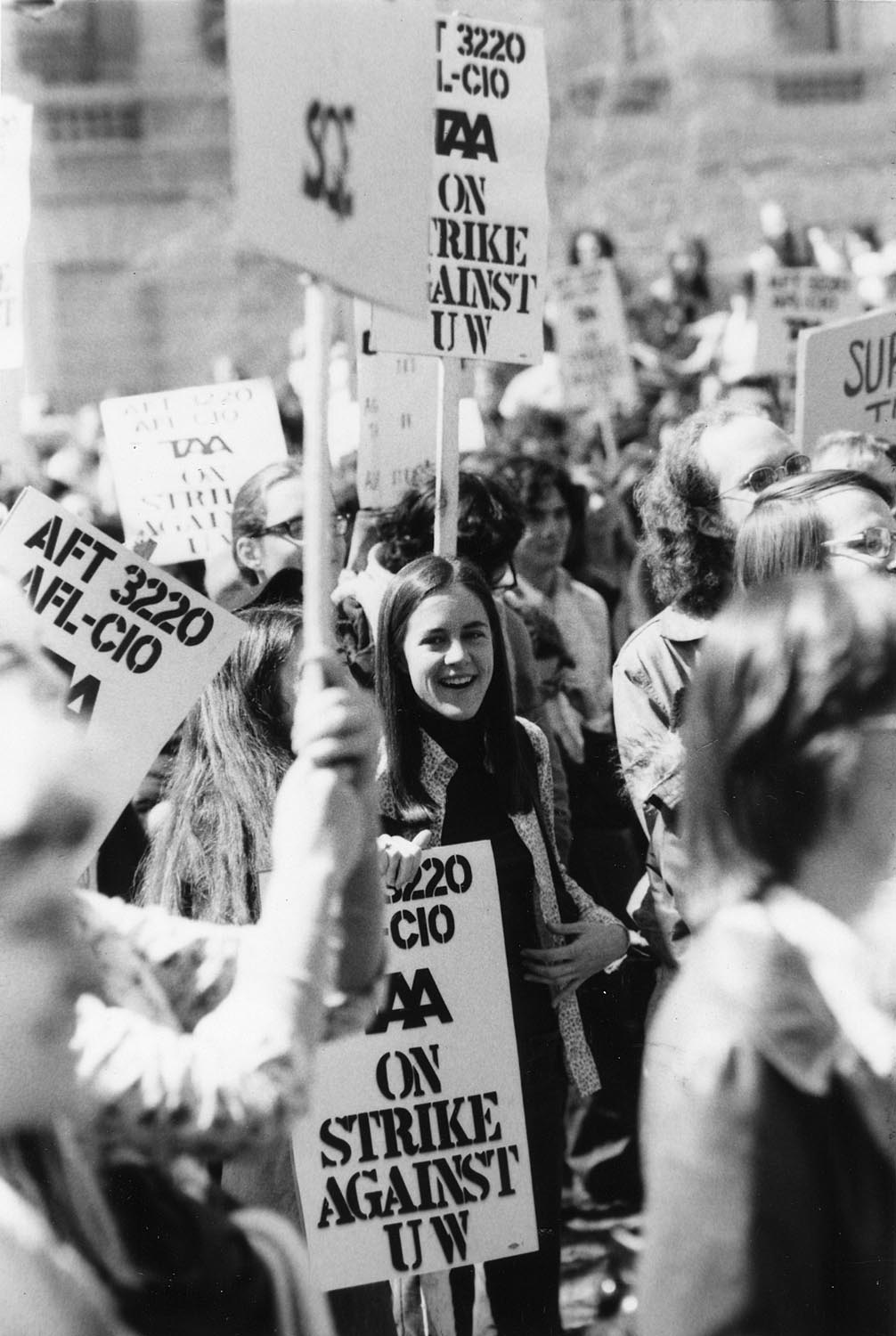
TAA members on strike in 1970

The Teaching Assistants Association (TAA) is a graduate student employee union formed at the University of Wisconsin–Madison in 1966. It is credited as the first graduate student labor union. Following voluntary recognition by the university as the teaching assistants' bargaining agent in 1969, negotiations resulted in a 1970 strike, which secured "bread-and-butter" gains such as job security alongside grievance procedures. Their major unmet demand from their strike—the inclusion of teaching assistants and students in the course planning process—went unfulfilled. The TAA struck again in 1980 and lost its union recognition until 1986. The union's protest at the Wisconsin State Capitol building began the 2011 Wisconsin protests.

== History ==
Following an anti-draft sit-in on University of Wisconsin–Madison's Administration Building in early May 1966, a small group of teaching assistants (TAs) organized to form the Teaching Assistants Association (TAA) in June and became the first graduate student labor union. Their original campaign goals were mostly "bread-and-butter": higher wages and better working conditions for TAs. In its first month, the TAA reaffirmed its connections to and roots in the anti-war movement and its calls for educational policy reform.

The union struggled for graduate student support until February 1969, when Wisconsin State Assembly majority leader Republican Representative John C. Shabaz proposed a bill to remove tuition remission for graduate students on assistantship. The bill was introduced during the black strike as a component of a conservative strategy to rout out out-of-state UW students, a group blamed for campus discontent. While the faculty thought the bill would not pass or would otherwise be vetoed, the TAA pledged to fight the bill and proposed that they become the TAs' official collective bargaining unit. Within weeks, they collected 1,100 members from 1,900 TAs and approached the university for recognition as the teaching assistants' bargaining agent. Citing a lack of legislative approval, campus chancellor H. Edwin Young declined, but reneged when a consequential strike loomed later in the semester. Young offered to bargain if a vote administered by the Wisconsin Employment Relations Commission upheld the TAA's claim of majority representation. After two days of elections, the union became the students' official bargaining agent on May 18, 1969, with 77% of voters overall in support and 52 of 81 academic departments with TAs in majority consensus. With threats of striking, the Shabaz bill was rescinded.

What a parody of progress it would be for us to march backward eating bread and dusty butter as we drag the polluted and competitive present into a lost socialist and democratic future.

— TAA newsletter during bargaining

With recognition, the university voluntarily agreed in a Structure Agreement to acknowledge and negotiate with the graduate student union. In completing the lengthy agreement process, the university decided to hire a recent graduate to represent them. The bargaining process was complicated by the union's lack of experience, skepticism, political ideology, and decentralized nature. The TAA operated as a participatory democracy and, as such, did not have a consistent bargaining group, which led to recapitulation and confusion on both sides of the negotiation. The two parties struggled to find common ground on the union's demands for the "bread-and-butter" wages and working conditions alongside additional asks for academic and human rights, such as job security through continual employment guarantees, class size limits, health benefits, office environment standards of light levels and space requirements, policies intended to end discrimination, participation in university governance, and evaluation by teams of students, faculty, and TAs, evenly split. Among their more contentious requests was for departmental bargaining with the TAA to establish and institutionalize roles for students and TAs in designing courses where TAs were employed. The requests that eroded faculty authority were not well received by the faculty or other labor unions, with the Wisconsin AFL–CIO head suggesting the latter demand was "not a proper union issue". The TAA reaffirmed the importance of the "educational planning" demand for the future of their generation, and at one point, the university drafted a shared course design clause before it was removed in faculty resistance.

=== 1970 strike ===
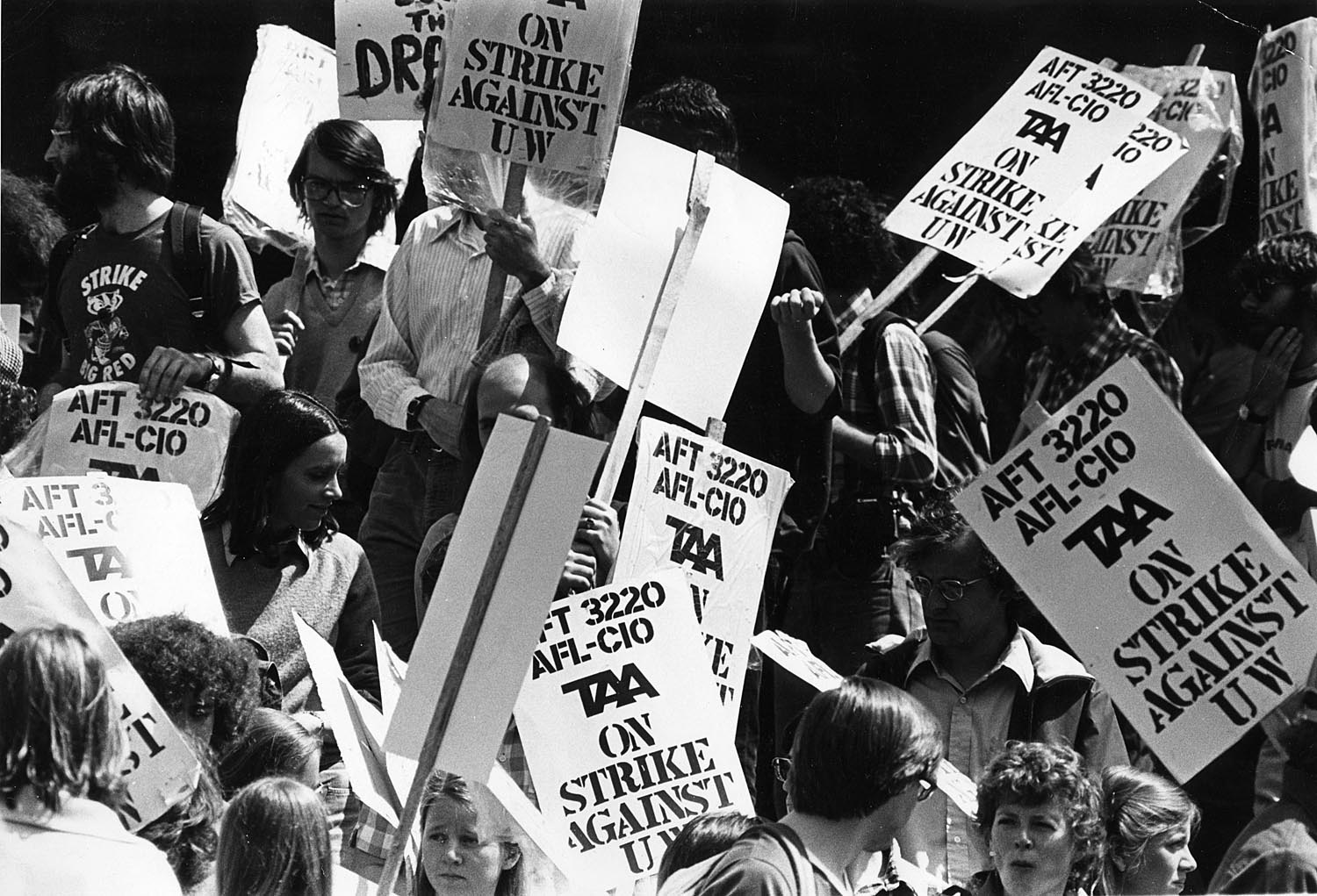
TAA on strike in 1970

With negotiations deadlocked, the TAA set January 8, 1970 as their bargaining deadline to be followed by "unspecified action". They set March 15 as their strike deadline and despite a hurried attempt to make amends in the days preceding, the union rejected the latest offer and went on strike. It was the first staff strike in the university's history and it would last 24 days. Chancellor Young called the strike illegal by state law and against their agreed terms for bargaining. Consequently, the administration severed discussions when the strike started, and sought a court order to stop it. Local labor support was mixed, as Local 171 ignored the strike and Teamsters Local 695 honored picket lines, halting food delivery, buses, and liquid nitrogen lab service. Some undergraduates picketed with the TAA and some striking TAs held their classes off-campus. The strike reduced class attendance in the areas closest to the biggest picket site, Bascom Hill, in its related College of Letters and Science and School of Education. (Note: The strike interrupted the schools of agriculture and engineering least due to their comparative lack of TAA representation.)

The strike was largely non-violent, but increased in militancy over time, especially as spring break approached. Groups such as the New Year's Gang and the Mother Jones Revolutionary League threatened physical harm if the union's demands were not met, and similar radical influx emboldened some strikers and alienated others enough to leave. The TAA president and others were arrested on March 24 for blocking a delivery, and the union picketed delivery routes throughout the spring break from March until April. Around the same time, Teamsters relented and allowed their drivers to work, the university announced hundreds of TAs would receive reduced paychecks during the strike, and a circuit judge granted the attorney general's injunction petition: the strike was illegal and the TAs must return to work.

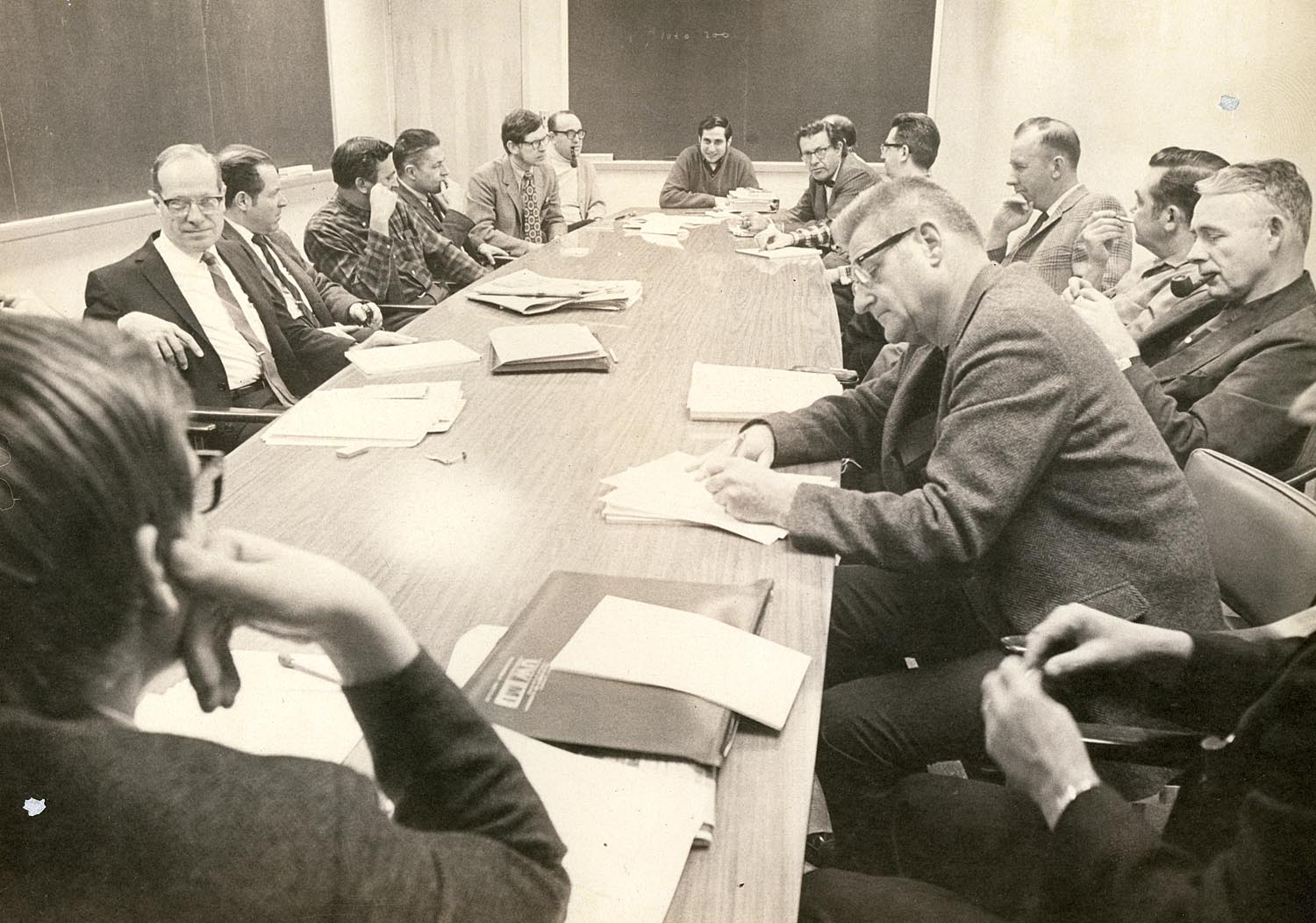
The university and TAA negotiating an end to the 1970 strike

In-person bargaining reconvened over the break, and the TAA's "educational planning" demand—the major unmet demand for which they went on strike—was off the table. While the demand engendered undergrad support and a similar provision was outlined in the 1969 Structure Agreement, the faculty were now fundamentally opposed. The university's proposal lacked the provision and was voted down at the April 5 TAA meeting, where they decided to continue the illegal strike. In the next two days, the Faculty Senate adopted a resolution that acknowledged the Structure Agreement's language but added that faculty hold the "ultimate responsibility ... for curriculum and course content". On April 7, the TAA voted against continuing the strike and accepted the university's latest offer in a vote of 534–348, and the Board of Regents approved the contract on April 10, 1970. State legislators were unhappy with the contract and at the request of the state's Joint Committee on Finance, the attorney general ruled on the contract's legality, finding it legal. The TAs had won union representation with bargaining rights and a contract that gave better job security and grievance procedures, though the TAA leadership and Daily Cardinal were unsure "who had won" the strike.

=== 1980 strike ===
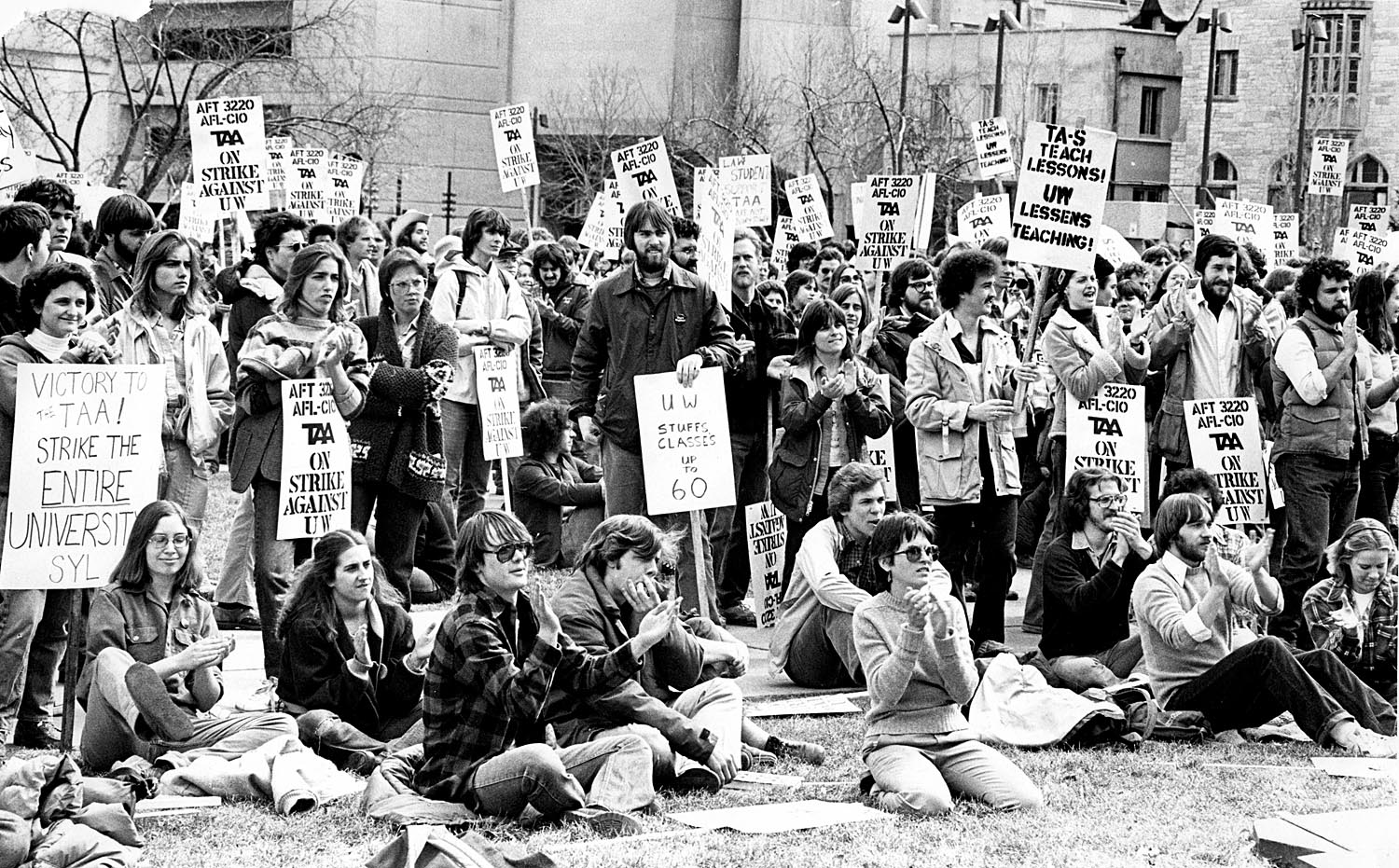
TAA on strike in 1980

The TAA went on strike again in 1980 regarding education-related policy and university governance. In response, the university rescinded its recognition of their contract. The Wisconsin legislature began to recognize the union in 1986.

=== Act 10 and Recall Walker ===
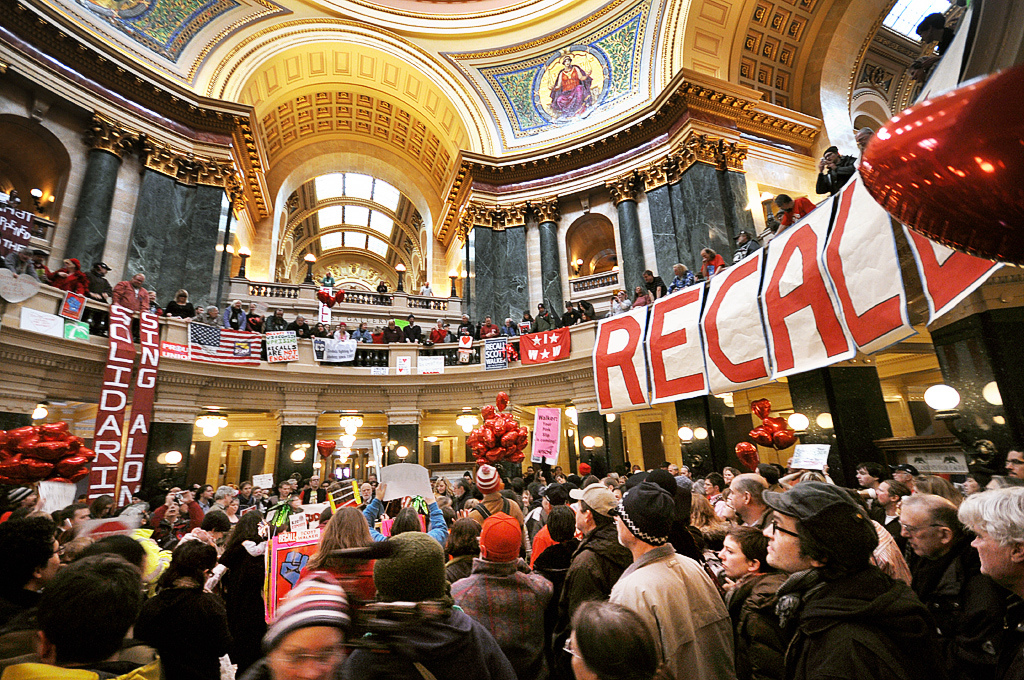
Protests in the Capitol, February 14, 2012

The TAA led a 1,000-person protest at the Wisconsin State Capitol building on Valentine's Day in 2011, which began the 2011 Wisconsin protests, including a monthlong protest at the capitol. The union voted against endorsing a challenger in the 2012 recall election.

== Legacy ==
The TAA is credited as the first graduate student labor union, and its formation preceded the unionization of several other graduate schools in the 1970s, including at the City University of New York (CUNY), Michigan, Oregon, and three universities in Florida. However, CUNY graduate students were covered in a 1968 union contract, which predated the TAA's first contract in 1970. UC Berkeley teaching assistants also had formed a union earlier under the American Federation of Teachers in December 1964, and had 400 members at one time. "The teaching assistants thereupon, by December, formed another local of the AFT, and soon counted over 400 members," but dissolved without winning recognition or a contract. This makes the TAA the first graduate student labor union to win recognition, and the first to negotiate an independent contract.

== See also ==
- List of graduate student employee unions

== Notes and references ==
Notes

Sources

- Cole, Andrew (March 21, 2012). "UW Teaching Assistants' Association rejects proposal to endorse Kathleen Falk in recall". Isthmus. Archived from the original on September 23, 2012.
- Cole, Andrew (May 29, 2012). "UW Teaching Assistants' Association won't support Tom Barrett in recall election". Isthmus. Archived from the original on October 7, 2013.
- Cronon, E. David; Jenkins, John W. (1999). University of Wisconsin: Renewal to Revolution, 1945–1971. Vol. 4. University of Wisconsin Press. ISBN 978-0-299-16290-0.
- Draper, Hal (1965). "36: Before the Second Round". Berkeley: The New Student Revolt. New York: Evergreen Black Cat. p. 139.
- Schenk, Tom Jr. (2007). The effects of graduate–student unionization (M.A.). Iowa State University. ProQuest 304858386.
- "Teaching Aides Elect Bargainer: Wisconsin Group Will Act for Graduate Students". The New York Times. May 18, 1969. p. 33. ProQuest 118750796.
