= Graduate Student Organizing Committee =

Student labor union at New York University

GSOC
- Graduate Student Organizing Committee
- Founded: 1998
- Headquarters: New York City, New York
- Location: United States
- Members: 2,200
- Parent organization: UAW Local 7902
- Website: makingabetternyu.org/gsocuaw/

The Graduate Student Organizing Committee (GSOC) is a labor union representing graduate teaching and research assistants at New York University (NYU).

GSOC is affiliated with the Technical, Office, and Professional Union, United Auto Workers Local 7902, an amalgamated union that also represents over 7,000 part-time and adjunct professors, student educators, and healthcare workers at New York University and The New School.

== Formation and first contract ==
GSOC is one of several labor organizations of graduate student teachers and researchers that formed at private universities in the 1990s. It is the first graduate employee union at a private U.S. university to have achieved collective bargaining unit recognition and negotiated a contract. (The contract expired in 2005 and the collective bargaining relationship with the university is scuttled.) When GSOC began to organize in the late 1990s, members believed that shifts in the academic labor market, including greater reliance on graduate student teaching and research, made necessary the formation of collective bargaining units. Members also sought a collective voice in their pay and working conditions.

In 2000, the National Labor Relations Board (NLRB) unanimously ruled that graduate assistants were statutory “employees” under the National Labor Relations Act. As well, it stipulated that NYU was obliged to enter into collective bargaining negotiations with GSOC after a majority of graduate employees at the university voted in favor of the union in an NLRB election.

In accordance with federal labor relations law and motions made by NYU and GSOC, the bargaining unit represented by GSOC in contract negotiations did not include graduate students who were primarily funded by private fellowships, those whose funding was not contingent on the performance of any work, and some other categories.

In 2002, GSOC and NYU negotiated the first graduate assistant union contract at an American private university. (Many public universities already had union contracts under state labor laws.) The three-year contract increased stipends (dramatically for some), instituted a health care plan, and created a third-party arbitration procedure for economic disputes.

== 2013 vote and recognition ==
In 2009, GSOC issued a petition to the NLRB to reverse the Brown decision. The regional labor relations board voted in favor of GSOC-UAW, but the petition stalled at the national level. In 2013, New York University and GSOC-UAW made a joint decision that GSOC would withdraw its petition to the NLRB. In November of that year, the university administration announced that if a majority of the graduate assistant population would vote in favor of GSOC-UAW again representing them in collective bargaining with the university, GSOC-UAW would be recognized in such a role. In December 2013, graduate assistants at NYU voted 620 to 10 in favor of collective bargaining with NYU allied with GSOC-UAW. As a result of this vote, GSOC-UAW again represents graduate assistants at NYU, and continues to bargain with the administration.

== See also ==
- Coalition of Graduate Employee Unions
- List of graduate student employee unions
- National Labor Relations Board
