= Timeline of strikes in 2024 =

Strikes in 2024

A number of labour strikes, labour disputes, and other industrial actions have occurred in 2024.

== Background ==
A labor strike is a work stoppage, caused by the mass refusal of employees to work, usually in response to employee grievances, such as low pay or poor working conditions. Strikes can also take place to demonstrate solidarity with workers in other workplaces or to pressure governments to change policies.

== Timeline ==
=== Continuing strikes from 2023 ===
- 2023–2024 DP World strike, strike by DP World workers in Australia, represented by the Maritime Union of Australia.
- 2023 Tesla Sweden strike
- 2023–2024 transport strikes in the Philippines

=== January ===
- 2024 Audi Mexico strike.
- 2024 Brazilian environmental workers strikes.
- 2024 general strike against Javier Milei
- 2024 New York Daily News strike, one day strike in protest of staffing cuts, the first strike by New York Daily News journalists since the 1990–1991 New York Daily News strike.
- 2024 Northern Ireland public sector strike, involving 150 000 public sector workers, the largest strike in Northern Ireland in over 50 years.
- 2024 Saskatchewan teachers' strike, organised by the Saskatchewan Teachers' Federation.
- 2024 Slovenian doctors strike.

=== February ===
- 2024 Finland strikes, large-scale strikes protesting against labour market reforms and social security cuts by the government of Petteri Orpo.
- 2024 Guinea general strike, following the arrest of trade union leader Sékou Jamal Pendessa.
- 2024 Lufthansa strikes
- 2024 NARTO strike, organised by the Nigerian Association of Road Transport Owners demanding an increase in freight charges.
- 2024 South Korean medical crisis
- 24-hour strike in Greece on 28 February to mark the first anniversary of the Tempi train crash, organised by ADEDY.

=== March ===
- 2024 Boston University strikes, organised by the Boston University Graduate Workers Union and the Boston University Residence Life Union.
- 2024 Kenyan doctors strike, organised by the Kenya Medical Practitioners, Pharmacists and Dentists Union.
- 2024 MASS MoCA strike, by workers at the Massachusetts Museum of Contemporary Art calling for increased wages, organised by the United Auto Workers Local 2110.
- 2024 Seoul bus drivers' strike, first strike by bus drivers in Seoul since 2012, seeking above-inflation pay raises.

=== April ===
- 2024 French air traffic controllers strikes.
- 2024 MA France strike, over job losses.

=== May ===
- 2024 ASC strikes, by ASC Pty Ltd workers in Australia.
- 2024 ArcelorMittal strike in Mexico, 55-day strike by ArcelorMittal steelworkers in Lázaro Cárdenas, Michoacán.
- 2024 Gravenchon oil refinery strike.
- 2024 Nigerian general strike, in response to the national cost-of-living crisis.
- 2024 RAI strike, over alleged interference in the public broadcaster by the government of Giorgia Meloni.
- 2024 Safran Québec strike, by Safran workers in Québec.
- 2024 University of California academic workers' strike
- 2024 Wilmar Sugar Australia strike.

=== June ===
- 2024 Aer Lingus strike.
- 2024 Bangladesh quota reform movement
- 2024 Bombardier strike, 18-day strike by Bombardier Inc. workers in Mississauga and Waterloo, Ontario represented by Unifor.
- 2024 Gibraltar Mine strike, by workers at the Gibraltar Mine in British Columbia, the second largest open-pit copper mine in Canada.
- 2024 Mali financial workers strike, organised by SYNABEF after the arrest of its secretary general Hamadoun Bah.
- 2024 Marianne strike, by Marianne journalists in protest against plans for the magazine to be purchased by Pierre-Édouard Stérin.
- 2024 Milan Stock Exchange strike, the first strike in the history of the Borsa Italiana, in protest over Euronext divestment from Italy.
- 2024 Samsung Electronics strike, the first strike in Samsung history.
- 2024 Swedish healthcare strike, strike by healthcare workers in Sweden demanding higher wages and better scheduling, the first in 16 years, organised by the Swedish Association of Health Professionals.
- 2024 Syncom Space Services strike, 5-day strike by Syncom Space Services LLC workers, a contractor for the Stennis Space Center, organised by the International Association of Machinists and Aerospace Workers.
- 2024 WestJet strike, organised by the Aircraft Mechanics Fraternal Association.

=== July ===
- 2024 Hôtel du Collectionneur strike, a two-hour strike by staff at the Hôtel du Collectionneur, where members of the International Olympic Committee were staying for the 2024 Summer Olympics, over not having received a pay raise in seven years.
- 2024 LCBO strike, two-weeks long strike by Liquor Control Board of Ontario workers, represented by the Ontario Public Service Employees Union, the first in the history of the LCBO.
- 2024 Nine Entertainment strike.
- 2024 Pakistan petroleum dealers strike, organised by the Pakistan Petroleum Dealers Association.
- 2024 SAG-AFTRA video game strike, organised by SAG-AFTRA.
- 2024 Sri Lanka rail strike, 2-day strike organised by the Station Masters’ Union protesting against understaffing.
- 2024 Walmart Chile strike, 6-day strike by Walmart Chile workers, organised by the National Federation of Walmart Workers and demanding pay raises that match inflation.
- 2024 Wentzville Assembly strike, 4-day strike by workers at the Wentzville Assembly facilities in Missouri, represented by the United Auto Workers.

=== August ===
- 2024 Argentina oilseed workers strike, organised by the San Lorenzo Department Oilseed Workers and Employees Union.
- 2024 AT&T strike.
- 2024 Caserones Copper Mine strike, by workers at the Caserones Copper Mine, owned by Lundin Mining.
- 2024 Escondida strike, by workers at Escondida, the biggest copper mine in the world.
- 2024 Hato Hone St John strike, strike by Hato Hone St John ambulance workers in Aotearoa New Zealand.
- 2024 Indian doctors strike, in protest over the rape and murder of a female postgraduate trainee doctor at R. G. Kar Medical College and Hospital in Kolkata, West Bengal, India.
- 2024 Mexican judicial reform protests, including strikes by judicial workers in protest against the 2024 Mexican judicial reform.
- 2024 Québec hotel workers strike, organised by the Confédération des syndicats nationaux-affiliated Fédération du commerce.
- 2024 SAS cabin crew strike in Norway, strike by Scandinavian Airlines cabin crew in Norway.

=== September ===
- 2024 Boeing machinists strike, the first strike by the International Association of Machinists and Aerospace Workers at Boeing since 2008.
- 2024 HandyDART strike, 18-day strike by HandyDART workers in Vancouver, British Columbia, represented by the Amalgamated Transit Union Local 1724, over undercompensation and understaffing.
- 2024 Jomo Kenyatta International Airport strike, organised by the Kenya Airport Workers Union in protest against a plan to lease the airport to the Adani Group.
- 2024 Marathon Petroleum Detroit strike, organised by the International Brotherhood of Teamsters Local 283 at a Marathon Petroleum refinery in Detroit.
- September 2024 Israel hostage deal protests, strike called by Histadrut demanding the Israeli government reach a prisoners deal with Hamas.
- September 2024 pro-Palestinian strike in Spain,
- 2024 United States hotel workers strike.

=== October ===
- 2024 United States port strike

=== November ===
- 2024 Canada Post strike

== List of lockouts in 2024 ==
=== February ===
- 2024 MLS referee lockout

=== July ===
- 2024 NEASO Lockout

=== August ===
- 2024 Canada railway dispute

== Changes in legislation ==
In March 2024, American judge J. Campbell Barker vacated the National Labor Relations Board's rule on joint-employer status that had been issued in 2023. The rule would have treated companies as employers of contract workers, requiring those companies to bargain with unions representing the contract workers.

Following the Labour Party victory in the 2024 United Kingdom general election, The Observer reported that the new government ordered government departments in August not to implement the Strikes (Minimum Service Levels) Act 2023, with the intention of formally repealing the law later in the year.

== Statistics ==
The China Labour Bulletin recorded a rise in strikes in China in the first half of 2024, with 719 work stoppages recorded compared to 696 in the first half of 2023. Around half of the strikes were recorded in the construction sector.

The Bureau of Labor Statistics recorded 31 major work stoppages (involving at least 1000 workers) in the United States in 2024. The New York State School of Industrial and Labor Relations at Cornell University (ILR) recorded 359 work stoppages total, involving 293 500 workers and 5,32 million working days lost, a 23,8% decrease in total stoppages and 45,5% decrease in involved workers from 2023. The ILR found that 60% of the work stoppages lasted less than five days, with 18% lasting over a month.

The New Zealand Ministry of Business, Innovation and Employment recorded 47 work stoppages in the country in 2024, involving 2530 workers and 11 827 working days lost.

== See also ==
- List of strikes
