= 2018 Canada Post strikes =

Strike action against Canada Post

- Date: October 22, 2018–November 27, 2018
- Location: Canada
- Goals: Wage increases, job security and minimum guaranteed hours
- Methods: Rotating strikes
- Result: Workers being legislated back to work

Parties
Canadian Union of Postal Workers	Canada Post

The 2018 Canada Post strikes were a series of rotating strikes, which began on October 22, 2018, against Canada Post by members of the Canadian Union of Postal Workers (CUPW). Strikers sought "better pay, more job security and minimum guaranteed hours." On November 24, 2018, Canadian Prime Minister Justin Trudeau's government passed Bill C-89, which ended the strike three days later, and mandated the postal workers return to work. CUPW members continued to work without a contract until September 2021, when they ratified a two-year agreement.

== Background ==
Between 1965 and 2005, there were 19 strikes at Canada Post. Strikes were ended through legislation in 1987, 1991 and 1997.

In 2007, letter mail started to decline in popularity in Canada. Having posted its first loss in 17 years, Canada Post began its transition to parcel shipments in 2011, which were on the rise due to the popularity of e-commerce. As Canada Post spends about 41% more on its labour force than its private competitors and has a mandate to ship everywhere in Canada, this placed downwards pressure on workers in order for Canada Post to remain competitive. Meanwhile, CUPW faced new challenges with less leverage operating in a new industry where Canada Post does not hold a monopoly.

A 2011 labour dispute between Canada Post and CUPW resulted in a two-week lock-out. This led to the Conservative government of the time passing a bill to legislate CUPW members back to work. CUPW challenged the constitutionality of the bill in the Ontario Superior Court of Justice, which ultimately found it to be unconstitutional.

== Timeline ==
In a public statement published on October 16, 2018, and following 10 months of negotiations, CUPW negotiators announced that the National Executive Board issued a 72-hour notice to Canada Post that CUPW members would go on strike if they could not reach a negotiated settlement. Among their demands were:

- Wage increases above the inflation rate
- Improved job security
- Minimum guaranteed hours
- Improved working conditions, particularly with respect to parcel delivery

Before the rotating strikes began, CUPW imposed a ban on overtime work, keeping employees working their normal schedule. As Canada Post relies heavily on overtime, this action alone caused a significant backlog, the size of which is disputed by CUPW and Canada Post.

As negotiators were unable to come to an agreement in time for the deadline imposed by CUPW, on October 22, 2018, Canada Post workers in Victoria, Edmonton, Windsor and Halifax went on strike for 24 hours, starting the first strike rotation. The following day, nearly 9000 Canada Post workers in the Greater Toronto Area would follow, starting the second rotation. CUPW stated that more strikes would follow daily at the discretion of the union's senior leadership, however, the locations and intensity would depend on how negotiations proceeded with Canada Post.

CUPW stated their motivation for choosing to organize rotating strikes was to minimize disruption to customers. During each rotation, no mail or parcels would be delivered in the relevant region while the strike was active.

Postal Services Resumption and Continuation Act

Parliament of Canada
- Long title: An Act to provide for the resumption and continuation of postal services
- Citation: S.C. 2018, c. 25
- Considered by: House of Commons of Canada
- Considered by: Senate of Canada
- Royal assent: 2018-11-26

Legislative history

Initiating chamber: House of Commons of Canada
- Bill citation: Bill C-89
- Introduced by: Patty Hajdu, Minister of Employment, Workforce Development and Labour
- First reading: 2018-11-26
- Second reading: 2018-11-26
- Committee of the Whole: 2018-11-24
- Third reading: 2018-11-24

Revising chamber: Senate of Canada
- Member(s) in charge: Mike Duffy
- First reading: 2018-11-26
- Second reading: 2018-11-26
- Third reading: 2018-11-26
- Passed: 2018-11-26
- Status: In force

One month later, on November 23, 2018, the federal government passed Bill C-89, the Postal Services Resumption and Continuation Act (French: Loi sur la reprise et le maintien des services postaux), ordering members of CUPW back to work. The bill went into effect on November 27, 2018. After C-89 was passed, Canada Post agreed not to enact a clause in the existing collective agreement with CUPW allowing Canada Post to mandate postal workers work overtime.

On December 11, 2018, CUPW announced it would challenge the constitutionality of Bill C-89 in the Ontario Superior Court. CUPW argued that Bill C-89 violated their rights to collective bargaining under the Canadian Charter of Rights and Freedoms, and was motivated by a "false emergency" created by Canada Post regarding the backlog that started to grow when CUPW first banned overtime work.

In December, 2018, a mediator was appointed by the government to oversee negotiations between Canada Post and CUPW. Negotiations continued for another year, when a second arbitration extension was requested on November 18, 2019.

In September, 2021, CUPW voted to ratify a two-year renewal agreement, which would remain in effect until December 31, 2023 for rural workers and January 31, 2024 for urban workers. The new agreement included:

- A 2% annual increase in wages plus a one-time lump sum payment to workers
- Moving rural workers to hourly pay
- A continued suspension of the contract clause allowing Canada Post to mandate overtime work until January 1, 2024.

On July 25, 2024, four years after the case was first filed, the Ontario Superior Court dismissed CUPW's case regarding the constitutionality of Bill C-89, arguing it was no longer relevant. CUPW has stated it would appeal the decision.

== See also ==
- 2024 Canada Post strike
