= Canadian Union of Postal Workers =

Trade union

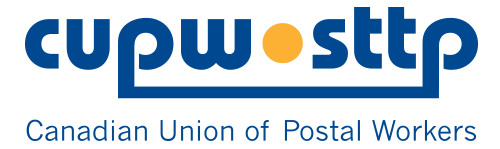
- Primary Logo

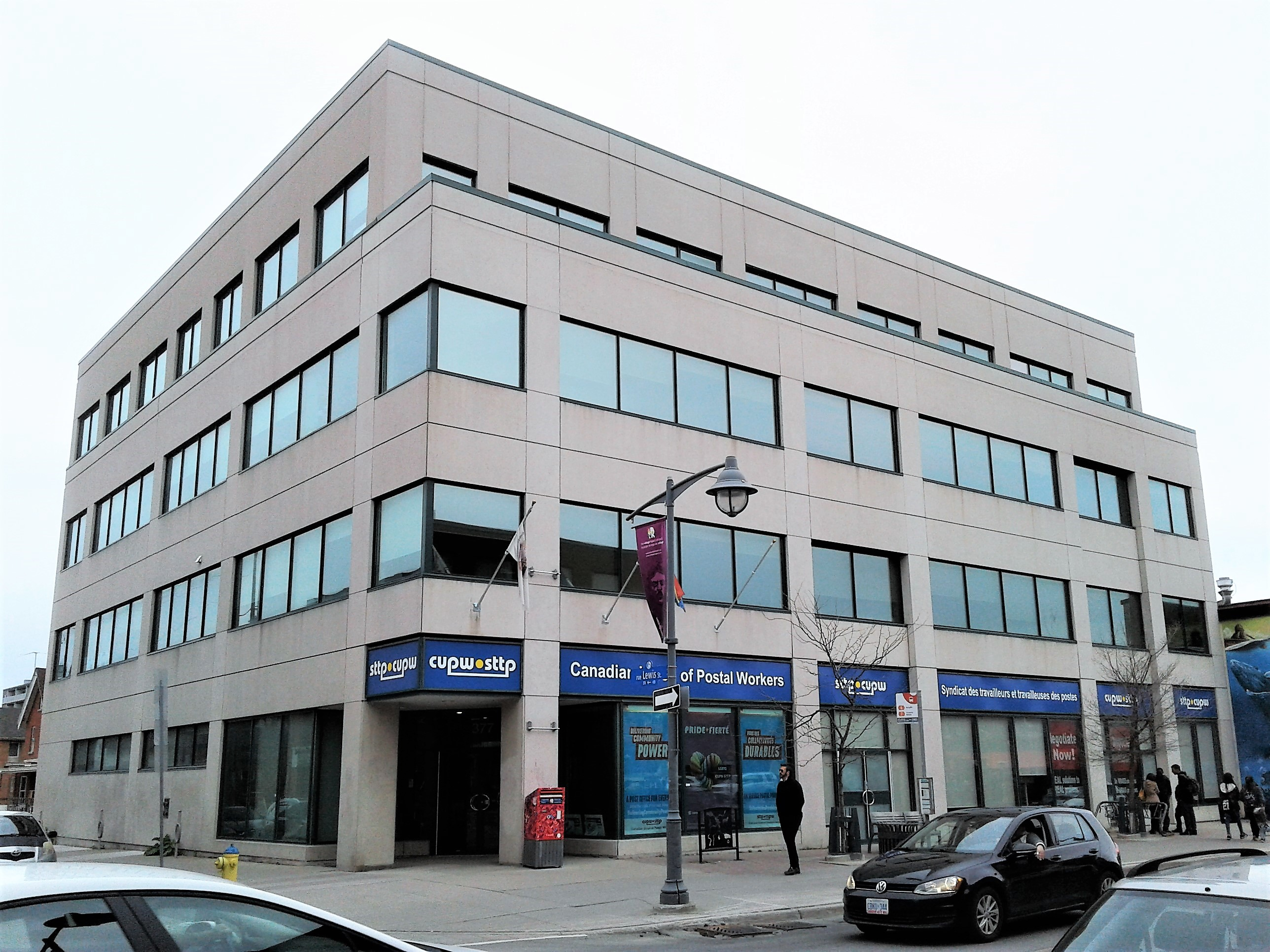
- CUPW Headquarters in Ottawa, Canada
- Abbreviation: CUPW
- Predecessor: Canadian Postal Employees Association
- Formation: 1965; 61 years ago
- Type: Trade union
- Headquarters: 377 Bank Street, Ottawa, Ontario, Canada
- Location: Canada
- Members: 55,000 (2024)
- President: Jan Simpson
- First National Vice-President: Rona Eckert
- Second National Vice-President: Coleen Jones
- Third National Vice President: Jody Hutton
- Board of directors: National Executive Board (meets every two months, fifteen members); National Exectutive Committee (day-to-day, nine members)
- Key people: Martin Jones, Fourth National Vice-President; Bev Collins, National Secretary-Treasurer; Carl Girouard, National Grievance Officer
- Main organ: CUPW National Convention (meets every four years)
- Affiliations: Canadian Labour Congress; International Transport Workers' Federation
- Website: cupw.ca

The Canadian Union of Postal Workers (CUPW; French: Syndicat des travailleurs et travailleuses des postes [STTP]) is a public-sector trade union representing postal workers including letter carriers, rural and suburban mail carriers, postal clerks, mail handlers and dispatchers, technicians, mechanics and electricians employed at Canada Post as well as private sector workers outside Canada Post. Currently, comprising upwards of 50,000 members, the Canadian Union of Postal Workers has historically been labeled as militant because of some of the actions undertaken since its inception in 1965 to help guarantee rights to all postal workers. According to former president Jean-Claude Parrot, "We succeeded to get the support of the membership because we earned our credibility with them...we got that reputation [of militancy] because we earned it."

As of 2024, the CUPW had approximately 55,000 members.

== History ==
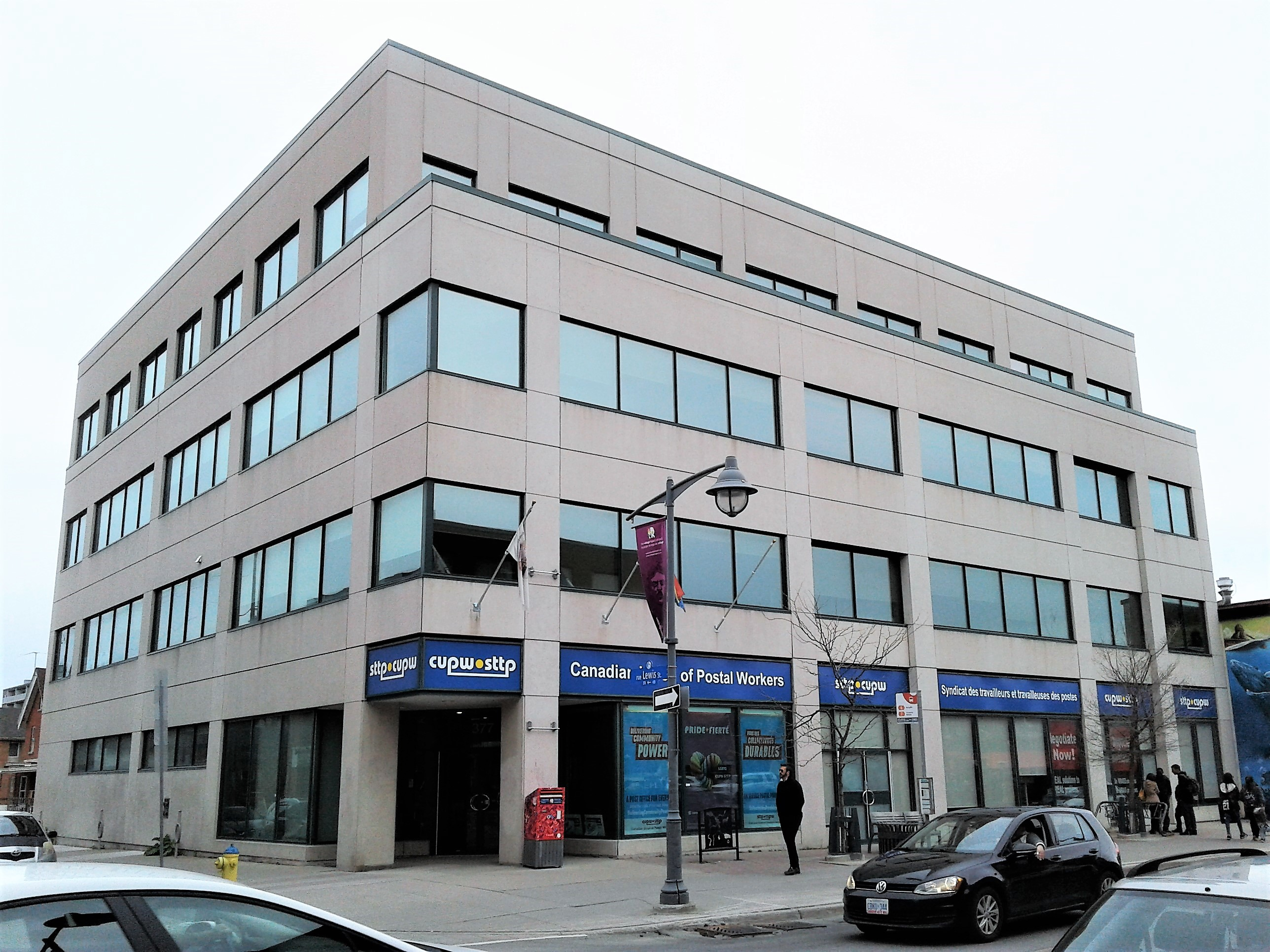
CUPW's national office in Ottawa

The CUPW formed in 1965 when the union was formed out of the Canadian Postal Employees Association (CPEA).

The CPEA was itself formed out of the merging of the Dominion Postal Clerks Association, the Dominion Railway Mail Clerks' Federation, and the Mail Porters Association in 1928.

== Activities ==
CUPW logo seen on some Union flags (as of August 2024)

The CUPW's first major strike was an illegal wildcat strike in 1965 (before public sector workers had the right to strike or even form unions) and is the largest illegal strike involving government employees. The action succeeded in winning the right to collective bargaining for all public sector employees. Other major industrial actions included a strike in 1968 and a campaign of walkouts in 1970 that resulted in above average wage increases. Further strikes in 1974 and 1975 succeeded in gaining job security in the face of new technology at the post office. A 1978 strike resulted in CUPW president Jean-Claude Parrot being jailed when the union defied back-to-work legislation passed by the Canadian parliament. CUPW's defiance of the law caused a temporary rift between it and the more conservative Canadian Labour Congress. In 1981, after another strike, CUPW became the first federal civil service union in Canada to win the right to maternity leave for its members.

=== Canada Post's transition into a crown corporation ===
In 1981, Canada Post was transformed from a government department to a crown corporation, fulfilling a long-standing demand by the union. It was hoped that by becoming a crown corporation governed by the Canada Labour Code, relations between Canada Post and its union would improve. While strike action has been less frequent, there were rotating strikes in 1987 and 1991 against plans to privatize postal outlets, both of which were ended by back-to-work legislation and also saw attempts by Canada Post to break the strike using strikebreakers.

=== Organizing of RSMC ===
In 2003, CUPW successfully completed the organizing of approximately 6,000 Rural and Suburban Mail Carriers (RSMC) into the Union and won a first collective agreement for these workers. This collective agreement is separate from the CUPW collective bargaining agreement. The two collective agreements have major differences. These differences stem from the RSMCs formerly being contractors as opposed to employees of Canada Post. For instance, RSMCs are paid in a contract style system as opposed to hourly, RSMCs are typically expected to find their own replacements during absences, and RSMCs may hire assistants who are not employed by Canada Post. Also in 2003 saw the first of many rollbacks for the Urban Postal Unit when the contract that was reached included the elimination of severance pay. Members ratified the Urban Mail Operations agreement by a vote of 65.4 per cent.

=== 2011 rotating strikes ===
On June 3, 2011, CUPW began labour actions against Canada Post with a series of rotating strikes. On June 14, 2011, at 11:59 p.m. EST, Canada Post announced a lockout of CUPW members. The lockout ended June 27, 2011, after Parliament passed a law rendering illegal any further work stoppage.

CUPW's collective agreement was signed in 2012 and expired January 31, 2016. The RSMC collective bargaining agreement expired in December 2015.

=== 2018 rotating strikes ===
An agreement between Canada Post Corporation and the Canadian Union of Postal Workers, Urban Postal Operations, expired January 31, 2018.

Failing to reach a new agreement, the union initiated a series of rotating strikes across the country on October 22, 2018. In November, the Liberal government then passed Bill C-89, which mandated postal workers to return to work. CUPW workers then worked without a contract for the next two years, with the CUPW and Canada Post reaching collective agreements in September 2021, which expired in January 2022, and was renewed for a year, with the RSMC collective agreements expiring on December 31, 2023, and the Urban agreement expiring on January 31, 2024, after bargaining started on November 25, 2023.

=== 2024 strike ===
As of August 29, 2024, the CUPW and Canada Post have yet to agree on any collective agreements. On August 28, 2024, CUPW have posted on their website that their National Executive Board have scheduled strike votes meetings from September 9, 2024, to October 20, 2024. On October 28, 2024, it was announced that both bargaining units voted in favour of strike action (95.8% of Urban workers and 95.5% of RSMC workers voted yes). On November 12, 2024, it was announced that the CUPW had issued 72-Hour strike notices, and that Canada Post had retaliated with 72-Hour lockout notices. On November 15, 2024, a nationwide strike for both bargaining units had taken effect at 12:01 am Eastern Time. Following a request by Labour Minister Steven MacKinnon on December 12, 2024, the Canada Industrial Relations Board ordered strikers to return to work by the morning of the 17th, ending the strike.

=== 2025 labour struggles and strike ===
On the afternoon of May 19, 2025, the National Executive Board issued a 72 hour strike notice to the Canada Post Corporation. On May 22, 2025, the CUPW posted on their website that the National Executive Board officially took strike action by calling an overtime ban for all union members. On Thursday, September 25, 2025, CUPW began a nationwide strike, citing government-proposed service cuts, including the end of home delivery to 4 million addresses, as the reason.

== Other postal unions ==
In 1989, the Canadian Labour Relations Board forced most Canada Post employees under one union. Until that time CUPW, had represented only "inside employees" with the Letter Carriers Union of Canada representing "outdoor employees" and the International Brotherhood of Electrical Workers representing smaller units of specialized workers within the post office. After a vote, CUPW was chosen to be the sole union representing the combined bargaining unit.

However, smaller trade unions remain at Canada Post. The Canadian Postmasters and Assistants Association covers 12,000 rural workers, the Association of Postal Officials of Canada has 3,400 supervisors, the Public Service Alliance of Canada represent 1,572 workers and the Union of Postal Communications Employees represents 2,600 technical workers.

The CUPW put forward several merger proposals to the Canadian Postmasters but, to date, they have been rebuffed.

== Worker groups ==
The union represents different types of workers within Canada Post divided into four groups:

- Group 1: Inside workers - postal clerks and mail handlers.
- Group 2: Outside workers - letter carriers and Motorized Service Carriers - originally from the Letter Carriers' Union of Canada (LCUC).
- Group 3: General Labour and Trades - mostly automotive service technicians, truck and transport mechanics, postal systems technicians, postal systems mechanics - the majority of these positions require the completion of a post-secondary program in their field or a provincial or inter-provincial certificate of qualification in their trade. Originally from the Public Service Alliance of Canada
- Group 4: Electronic specialists and forepersons, like the group 3 workers, need a course in a technical or trade school to get in and require to attend courses. Originally from the International Brotherhood of Electrical Workers

== Private sector ==
The Canadian Union Of Postal Workers represents workers outside Canada Post, such as cleaners, couriers, drivers, warehouse workers, paramedics, emergency medical dispatchers, printers and other workers and total 536 members in separate bargaining units.

== Outside causes ==
The union is also noted for supporting political causes. It spends funds in participating on issues such as child care, Cuba, abortion, Colombia, anti-racism, anti–North American Free Trade Agreement (NAFTA), anti–global capitalism, marijuana decriminalization, campaigns for women's equality and human rights. CUPW has also protested the Vietnam War, supported the disarmament movement, opposed South Africa's apartheid regime and opposed the bombing of Iraq, Yugoslavia and Afghanistan. The CUPW also supports the international campaign of Boycott, Divestment and Sanctions (BDS) against the state of Israel "...until such time that it respects international law and the inalienable rights of the Palestinian people."

== Presidents ==
1974: Joe Davidson
1977: Jean-Claude Parrot
1992: Darrell Tingley
1999: Dale Clark
2002: Deborah Bourque
2009: Denis Lemelin
2015: Mike Palecek
2019: Jan Simpson
