= 2024–2025 Canada Post labour dispute =

Postal union labour dispute in Canada

2024 Canada Post strike
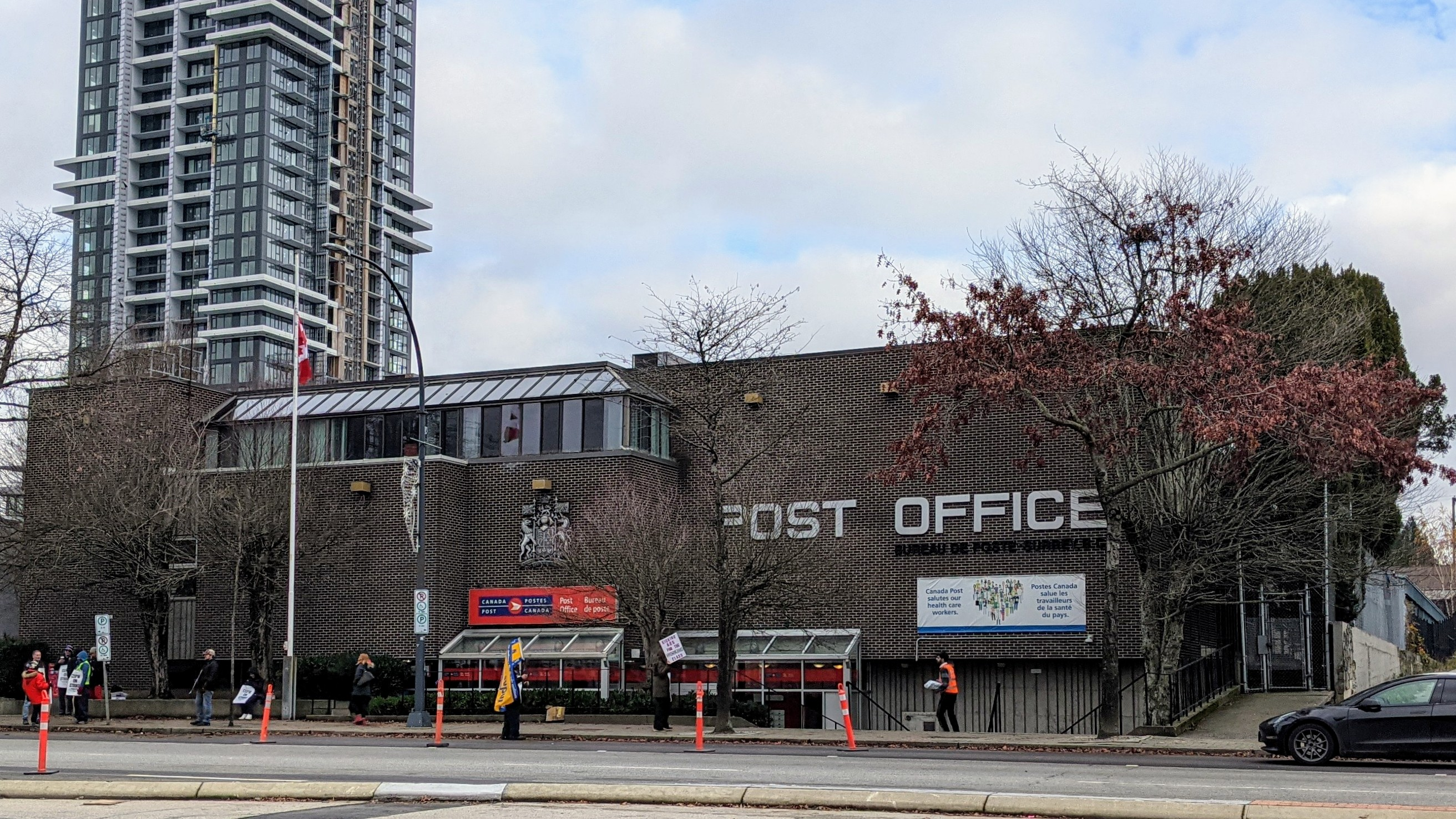
- CUPW strikers outside a Canada Post facility in Surrey, British Columbia in November 2024
- Date: November 15, 2024 – December 17, 2024 (1 month and 2 days)
- Location: Canada
- Methods: Strike action
- Status: Suspended

Parties
Canadian Union of Postal Workers	Canada Post

2025 Canada Post strike
- Date: September 25, 2025 – November 21, 2025 (1 month, 3 weeks and 6 days)
- Location: Canada
- Methods: Strike action (until October 10, 2025); Rotating strike (after October 10, 2025)
- Status: Suspended

Parties
Canadian Union of Postal Workers	Canada Post

The 2024–2025 Canada Post labour dispute was a protracted labour dispute that included two separate strike actions against Canada Post by the national membership of the Canadian Union of Postal Workers (CUPW). The first strike began on November 15, 2024 and was suspended on December 17, 2024. In between the two strikes a number of labour actions had taken place, such as an overtime ban and a refusal to deliver or process unaddressed flyers. The second strike began on September 25, 2025 and was suspended as a national strike on October 10, 2025, though it remained ongoing as a rotating strike until November 21, 2025.

== Background ==
Negotiations for a new contract began on November 15, 2023, one year prior to the initial strike. On August 2, 2024, CUPW filed with the federal Minister of Labour to get conciliators to help mediate. After continued impasse in negotiations and a cooling-off period, the Government of Canada appointed mediators to assist in negotiation that, ultimately, was also unsuccessful.

At the time of the strike, CUPW represented approximately 55,000 striking workers. Its list of demands included:

- wage increases of 24% over four years, which it says will keep wages up to inflation;
- enhancements to group benefits, such as coverage for fertility treatments and gender-affirming care;
- improved protections against technological change;
- enhancements to paid medical leave;
- paid meal and rest periods; and
- increased short-term disability benefits.

Canada Post declined these demands, instead offering wage increases of 11.5% over four years as well as increased paid leave. The Crown corporation has described its finances as "unsustainable," reporting over $3 billion in losses since 2018 and debts exceeding $1 billion. In 2023, Canada Post spent $4.9 billion on labour costs against $6.9 billion in revenue, with operating costs per hour for parcel delivery ranging from $50 to $60 versus industry benchmarks of $40 to $50. Unlike many Crown corporations, Canada Post is not taxpayer-funded and must sustain itself entirely on its own revenues.

== Timeline ==
On November 12, 2024, the CUPW issued a 72-hour strike notice, followed by a 72-hour lockout notice from Canada Post. The deadline for an agreement lapsed on November 15, thus triggering a nationwide strike.

On November 28, 2024, Canada Post temporarily laid off some striking employees. In response, CUPW filed a complaint with the Canada Industrial Relations Board (CIRB), arguing that Canada Post violated the Canada Labour Code. In a notice posted to members, CUPW described the layoffs as a "scare tactic" meant to intimidate union members.

On December 1, Canada Post presented a "framework" to CUPW in order to end the strike. CUPW said on their website that its negotiators were reviewing the framework documents.

On December 9, CUPW reduced its wage increase demands from 24% over four years to a 19% raise.

On December 12, Conservative Party Leader Pierre Poilievre asked Prime Minister Justin Trudeau when the government would step in to end the strike. Trudeau responded that the "best deals are made at the bargaining table". The following day, Labour Minister Steven MacKinnon declared an impasse in the talks, and directed the CIRB to order the postal workers back to work. The CIRB ordered the strikers to return to work by the morning of December 17. A group of strikers protested the decision at the Moncton office of Employment Minister Ginette Petitpas Taylor.

As part of the CIRB's ruling, Canada Post's contracts with its employees were extended until May 2025 to give more time for negotiations.

On May 19, 2025, CUPW gave notice that they would strike again starting on May 23, 2025. However, after a meeting with Canada Post on May 22, the union announced a ban on overtime work, averting a strike.

On September 15, 2025, CUPW instructed all their members to neither deliver nor process unaddressed flyers, escalating their strike action, but at the same time lifting their overtime ban.

On September 25, 2025, following Minister Joël Lightbound's announcement to bring reforms to Canada Post; such as shuttering more rural post offices, allowing Canada Post greater ease in raising prices, more reliance on transporting mail by ground and ending home delivery service, CUPW, calling it "an attack on our postal service and workers," announced a national strike effective immediately.

On October 10, 2025, CUPW announced that they would suspend the national strike in favour of a rotating strike, allowing mail delivery to resume.

On November 21, 2025, the rotating strike was suspended when Canada Post and CUPW reached a tentative agreement for new contracts.

== Impact of 2024 strike ==
=== Domestic ===
Public reactions to the strike were mixed. In an Angus Reid poll conducted over the strike's third week, 34% of Canadians sided with Canada Post, 29% sided with the striking workers, and 37% were unsure or didn't support either side. Many Canadians accused the striking workers of "cancelling Christmas" due to the strike being so close to the holidays.

To prevent passports from being held in processing centres, Service Canada delayed the distribution of 215,000 passports. About ten million packages were not delivered.

The strike negatively impacted Black Friday sales, with many small businesses unable to ship orders during their peak season. The Canadian Federation of Independent Business reported the strike had cost small and medium-sized businesses $1.6 billion by December 13, and that 73% of small businesses intended to reduce usage of Canada Post.

Canada Post's Santa Claus letter program was suspended, with Canada Post saying that all letters received would be responded to once the strike is over, but that they could not guarantee responses before Christmas. In some communities, members of the public, businesses and union locals organized their own drop boxes to receive letters to Santa.

Due to the strike, Elections Canada did not provide voter information cards for the December 16 by-election in Cloverdale—Langley City. Some municipalities and condominiums were unable to provide public notices of their meetings.

Thousands of social assistance cheques went undelivered in British Columbia, although most recipients receive direct deposits.

=== International ===
On November 29, 2024, Canada Post asked the mail services of all other countries to stop accepting or sending mail to Canada, leaving all mail unprocessed in secure containers from November 15, 2024. This mail could not be delivered or even scanned due to the strike.

== See also ==
- 2018 Canada Post strikes
- Timeline of strikes in 2024
- Timeline of strikes in 2025
