= Jan Simpson =

Barbadian-Canadian trade unionist

Jan Simpson is a Barbadian-Canadian trade unionist. She has been president of the Canadian Union of Postal Workers (CUPW) since 2019.

Simpson's family emigrated from Barbados to Toronto when she was 3. She worked for Canada Post for more than 30 years and, in 2011, became an elected representative of CUPW for the first time. In 2015, she was elected First-National Vice President, becoming the first Black person on CUPW's national executive. In 2019, she was elected president of the union and in so doing became first black woman to lead a national union in Canada. In April 2020, amidst the COVID-19 pandemic, Simpson raised concerns about the safety of Amazon workers. In November 2021, CUPW filed a grievance on behalf of postal workers who refused to get vaccinated against COVID-19. While encouraging members to get the vaccine, Simpson stated "However, we won't stand for one of our members losing their livelihood while there exist other ways of ensuring the health and safety of the workplace." In May 2023, she was re-elected as head of CUPW. In 2024, Simpson led CUPW during the 2024 Canada Post strike.

Simpson has been a member of the Coalition of Black Trade Unionists since 2005.
