= Timeline of strikes in 2025 =

Strikes in 2025

In 2025, a number of labour strikes, labour disputes, and other industrial actions occurred.

== Background ==
A labour strike is a work stoppage caused by the mass refusal of employees to work. This can include wildcat strikes, which are done without union authorisation, and slowdown strikes, where workers reduce their productivity while still carrying out minimal working duties. It is usually a response to employee grievances, such as low pay or poor working conditions. Strikes can also occur to demonstrate solidarity with workers in other workplaces or pressure governments to change policies.

== Timeline ==
=== Continuing strikes from 2024 ===
- 2024–2025 Canada Post labour dispute
- 2024–2025 SAG-AFTRA video game strike
- 2024–2025 Vanuatu teachers strike, 18-month strike by teachers in Vanuatu, represented by the Vanuatu Teachers Union.

=== January ===
- 2025 Oregon Nurses Association strike

=== February ===
- 2025 New York corrections officers' strike

=== March ===
- 2025–2026 Birmingham bin strike, strike by refuse workers in Birmingham, England, over proposed pay cuts and elimination of Waste Recycling and Collection Officer roles.
- 2025 Chiquita strike, months-long strike by Chiquita banana workers in Panama.

=== May ===
- 2025 NBR strike

=== June ===
- 2025 District Council 33 strike
- 2025 Société de transport de Montréal strikes

=== August ===
- 2025 Air Canada flight attendants strike, 3-day strike by Air Canada flight attendants, represented by the Canadian Union of Public Employees, over wages and compensation for unpaid work.
- 2025 Boeing machinists' strike

=== September ===
- 2025 Italian general strikes and protests for Gaza
- 2025 Peru nurses strike, 14-day strike by nurses in Peru over poor conditions in hospitals.

=== October ===
- 2025 Alberta teachers' strike

=== November ===
- 2025–2026 Nigerian health workers strike, 84-day strike by health workers in Nigeria, represented by the Joint Health Sector Unions.

=== December ===
- 2025–2026 Iranian protests, protests against the Iranian regime sparked by the Iranian economic crisis, including strikes.
- 2025 Portuguese general strike, first general strike in Portugal in 12 years.
