= 2024 Canada railway dispute =

Freight railway labour-business dispute

- Date: Began August 22, 2024
- Location: Canada
- Methods: Lockout by employers
- Status: Back-to-work order to be challenged by union

Parties
Teamsters Canada Rail Conference	Canadian National Railway; Canadian Pacific Kansas City	Government of Canada; CIRB

The 2024 Canada railway dispute was a labour-business dispute between the Canadian National Railway Company (CN) and Canadian Pacific Kansas City (CPKC) and the Teamsters Canada Rail Conference that shut down the freight railway operations of both railway companies. The shutdown also included passenger trains operating on CPKC tracks, but not passenger trains running on CN tracks. The shutdown began on August 22, when CN and CPKC locked out over 9,300 employees.

The Canada Industrial Relations Board (CIRB) ordered trains to resume operation on August 26; however, on August 29, the Teamsters Canada union filed an appeal to reverse the order and restore their right to strike. This was the first time there was a simultaneous shutdown of both major Canadian railways. It was also the first time Teamsters Canada workers had a lockout; however, the union intended to strike if there was no settlement or no lockout in effect.

== Timeline ==
Originally, the CN contract with its union would have expired in 2022, one year ahead of the CPKC contract. However, in that year, CN was granted a one-year extension to avoid contract renegotiation while it implemented new federal rules to address worker fatigue issues. The result of this extension was that the labour contracts for both CN and CPKC would expire at the end of 2023. This resulted in the possibility of both railways shutting down simultaneously due to a labour dispute.

About two weeks before the potential shutdown date of August 22, 2024, CN and CPKC started a gradual shut-down of their systems. The two railways started to refuse shipments to avoid stranding cargo especially perishable and dangerous goods. Some of CN's and CPKC's competitors in the United States also started to refuse shipments to Canada.

Several days before the shutdown, Minister of Labour Steve MacKinnon refused CN's request to order binding arbitration. Instead, the minister urged all parties to come to a negotiated agreement.

On August 18, the union announced it would serve CPKC with a 72-hour strike notice, that would take effect on August 22 if there were no settlement.

On August 19, shipping firm Maersk stopped accepting shipments for Canada that would need to be transported by rail rather than by road.

The shutdown began on August 22, when CN and CPKC failed to reach an agreement with the Teamsters Canada Rail Conference and locked out over 9,300 employees. However, there was no stoppage in CPKC operations within the United States and Mexico, or CN operations within the United States.

Later on August 22, Minister of Labour referred the matter to the Canada Industrial Relations Board (CIRB), directing binding arbitration. He stated that operations would resume within days.

By the next day, August 23, CN had ended its lockout and its employees were returning to work. However, the Teamsters union served a 72-hour strike notice on CN, stating that it did not believe the issues between the union and the employer were insurmountable. The Teamsters union stated it intended to challenge the constitutionality of the minister's referral. CPKC was waiting for an order from the CIRB before restarting operations.

On August 24, the CIRB ordered all employees back to work, and for CN and CPKC trains to start running on August 26. It also ordered binding arbitration to begin on August 29. The CIRB order ended the lockout and voided the strike notice against CN. Teamsters said they would comply with the order, but will appeal the CIRB's decision. CPKC said it would take several weeks to restore operations. CN estimated that each day of the work stoppage would require 3 to 5 days of recovery.

On August 29, the Teamsters union filed an appeal with the Federal Court of Appeal to overturn the back-to-work order, with the goal of restoring the union's right to strike.

== Legal issues ==
One professor of business law, Gilles LeVasseur at the University of Ottawa, stated that the minister only has the power to refer the issue to the CIRB, but it was then up to the Board to determine what steps it should take. LeVasseur stated that the Board could only order binding arbitration if it is convinced that is the only way to deal with the dispute. A professor of employment law at the University of Manitoba, Bruce Curran, commented that if the Board tried to order the workers back on the job, the union could seek judicial review of the decision, creating uncertainty and delays.

When the union challenged the Labour minister's referral to the CIRB to end the shutdown, the board's chairwoman replied "The board has concluded that, in this case, it has no discretion or ability to refuse to implement, in whole or in part, the minister’s directions or to modify their terms."

To end the shutdown, the Labour minister invoked Section 107 of the Canada Labour Code which allows the minister to "direct the Board to do such things as the Minister deems necessary". However, the referral could face a legal challenge as the Supreme Court of Canada recognized in 2015 the existence of union rights in the Canadian Charter of Rights and Freedoms. Also in early August, the CIRB advised the federal government that the freight operations of the two railways could not be deemed an "essential" service as their shutdown would not result in significant health and safety concerns. In a similar case, Ontario Court of Appeal set a high bar for removing the right to strike, assuming a short strike affecting "public health and safety, the environment, and the economy".

== Safety issues ==
The Teamsters accused both companies of attempting to weaken safety protections with respect to rest periods, shift length and scheduling. The union also objected to CN's plan to reassign some employees far away from home for several months to cover labour shortages. The union also accused CPKC of understaffing rail traffic controllers. A CN strike in 2019 was largely over safety-related issues.

CPKC denied it was asking to change any work rules, and said that its offer "fully complies with new regulatory requirements for rest and does not in any way compromise safety." CN also said its offer would comply with regulatory requirements for duty and rest periods.

In 2020, Transport Canada introduced the Duty and Rest Period Rules for Railway Operating Employees phased in between 2022 and 2024; these cover only some operating railway employees, according to Bruce Curran, an associate law professor at the University of Manitoba. Transport Canada has yet to update its fatigue-management regulations for railways so that they reflect the latest scientific research. It started consultations for updated "Fatigue Management System Regulations" in 2022, but these regulations would not be ready for publication until 2025. In May 2023, Transport Canada increased the minimum rest period between shifts to 10 hours at home, 12 hours away from home and 12 hours for freight workers; previously the minimums were 6 hours, 8 hours and 16 hours, respectively.

== Reactions ==
A week before the shutdown, Premier Danielle Smith of Alberta was already calling on the federal government to enact back-to-work legislation, in the event of a shutdown.

On the first day of the shutdown, Premier Doug Ford of Ontario urged the parties to return to the bargaining table and keep the railways operating. In a public statement, Ford stated: "The rail shutdown at CN and CPKC is already costing workers, transit users and businesses across the country, and we cannot afford to let things get worse."

On the day after the federal referral, some trains had resumed service in British Columbia, but not all. Premier David Eby of British Columbia stated that a continued shutdown would be devastating to the British Columbia economy, for the ports of Prince Rupert and Vancouver, and then spreading to small businesses. He urged the parties to return to negotiations.

At the federal level, the New Democratic Party harshly criticized the Liberal government's decision to refer the matter to the Board for arbitration. At the time of the shutdown, the Liberal minority government had a confidence-and-supply agreement with the New Democratic Party. If the Liberal government had introduced back-to-work legislation, it would have needed the support of one of the opposition parties to pass it, since the Liberals had only a minority government.

At the time of the shutdown, the Bloc Québécois blamed the two railway companies for the economic crisis and for bargaining in bad faith. The party declined to say whether it would support back-to-work legislation and stated it had not supported such legislation in the past.

The Conservative Party, the Official Opposition, did not comment on the railway issue.

Many industry and trade organizations in an open letter warned that the shutdown would have an immediate coast-to-coast impact and tarnish Canada's reputation as a reliable trading partner.

== Impacts ==
Moody's Ratings estimated that the shutdown could cost the economy up to $341 million per day, a rate equivalent to 4 percent of Canada's GDP. The shutdown would disrupt supply chains across North America as Canada ships most of its exports to the United States by rail. A rail shutdown would affect shipments of grain, autos, coal and potash among other goods. During the shutdown, more than $500,000 per day of goods could not be shipped. Containers piled up at ports waiting to be shipped by rail. Canadian manufacturers had to pay penalties to some of their customers for late shipments. If they could ship by truck, shipping costs were higher.

The lockout resulted in the suspension of several commuter rail services operating on CPKC lines. The West Coast Express in Vancouver suspended its entire line. Services on Ontario's GO Transit's Milton line, as well as to Hamilton station on the Lakeshore West line, were suspended. Exo's Vaudreuil-Hudson, Saint-Jérôme, and Candiac lines in Montreal suspended operation. Via Rail's service between Sudbury and White River was suspended. Passenger trains operating on Canadian National lines were not affected, as Canadian National dispatchers were not part of the work stoppage.
