= 2023 United Auto Workers strike =

US automaker labor dispute

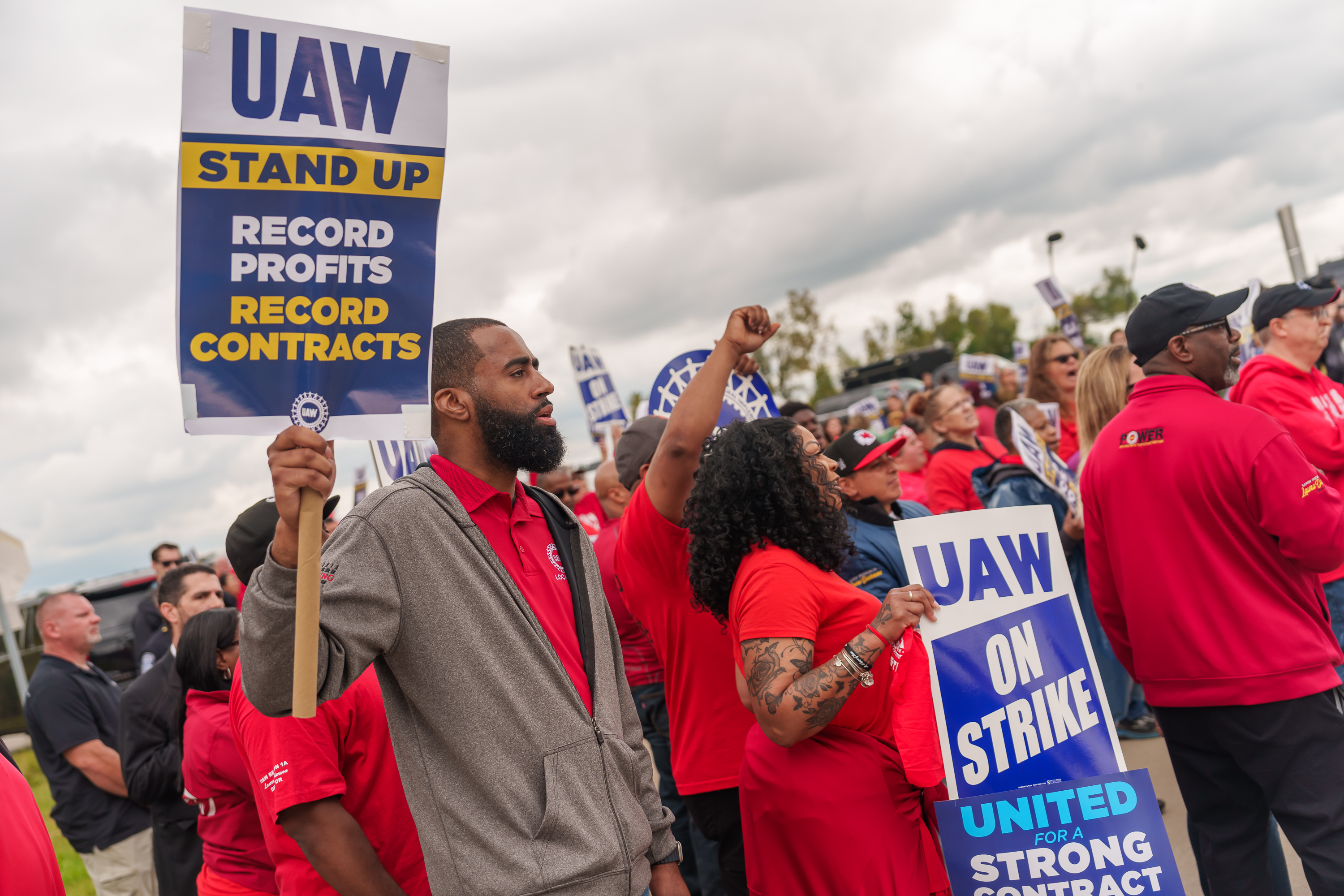
- Striking workers listening to a speech by US President Joe Biden in Michigan in September 2023
- Date: September 15 – October 30, 2023 (1 month, 2 weeks and 1 day)
- Location: United States: Michigan Assembly Plant, Wayne, Michigan; Toledo Complex, Toledo, Ohio; Wentzville Assembly, Wentzville, Missouri
- Caused by: Disagreements over the terms of a new labor contract
- Goals: Increased wages over four years to offset inflation; End to the tiered employment system; Improved overtime and retirement benefits; Improved worker protections against plant closures; 32-hour work week
- Methods: Picketing; strike action; rolling strike; walkout
- Result: Increased wages and return of cost of living adjustments; End to two tiered employment system; Improved overtime and retirement benefits; Written contract right to strike over plant closures

Parties
United Auto Workers	Ford Motor Company; General Motors; Stellantis

Number
49,800 strikers	

The 2023 United Auto Workers strike was a labor strike involving automobile workers in the labor union United Auto Workers (UAW) and the three unionized automakers in the United States—Ford Motor Company, General Motors, and Stellantis. These three automakers' factories combined employ about 145,000 UAW members and produce about 50 percent of the vehicles manufactured annually in the US, accounting for 1.5 percent of US GDP. The strike began on September 15, 2023, when the union was unable to reach a deal with the three automakers. It was the first trilateral strike against the three automakers in the union's history.

The hardline stance taken by the newly elected UAW president Shawn Fain contributed to the UAW's decision to strike. In particular, he has criticized stagnant wages that do not account for inflation and has called for the end of a tiered employment system that underpays newer employees, the restoration of overtime and retirement benefits that were lost due to the 2008 financial crisis, the institution of a four-day workweek, and improved worker protections against plant closures as electric vehicle production increases.

A central concern for the automakers is the cost of labor relative to domestic and foreign non-union competitors, particularly as the industry transitions to electric vehicle manufacturing. The automakers have stated that they anticipate the need to invest a significant portion of their profits from gasoline-powered vehicles into new production technology for electric vehicles.

The strike was suspended in the last week of October as the automakers made tentative deals that largely matched the UAW demands, starting with Ford on October 25, followed by Stellantis on October 28 and finally General Motors on October 30. In announcing the deals with the automakers, UAW instructed workers to return to the job, thus ending the 46-day labor strike on October 30. The new contracts would be ratified when individual UAW membership voting with all three companies ended November 16–17, 2023.

== Background ==
=== United Auto Workers ===
The labor union United Auto Workers (UAW) represents approximately 145,000 automobile workers employed at Ford Motor Company, General Motors, and Stellantis. To achieve its goals, UAW has engaged in strike action; from November 1945 to March 1946, UAW went on strike against General Motors. The 1945—1946 strike established a strategy, forged by then-UAW president Walter Reuther, to target efforts on a single company. Since the 1950s, UAW has faced declining union membership and a growing service sector, reducing the economic impact that a strike could have. In 2019, UAW autoworkers went on strike against General Motors. The 40-day work stoppage cost General Motors US$3.6 billion and caused a single-quarter recession in Michigan.

=== Contract negotiations ===
In March 2023, newly elected UAW president Shawn Fain stated that workers were "fed up with the status quo" and assured that he would negotiate for changes to workers' contracts. Fain called for cost of living adjustments to account for inflation ahead of the current contracts expiring on September 14 and asked for wage increases lost in the 2008 financial crisis. Members have expressed interest in both ending a two-tier wage system in which newer employees are paid significantly less than older employees, and domestic plant construction. Fain continued his sentiments at the Automotive Press Association in April, expressing disappointment in the idling of the Belvidere Assembly Plant in Belvidere, Illinois. Additionally, he lambasted wage decreases that workers at joint venture battery factories face compared to workers at older factories.

By May 2023, the potential for a strike loomed over contract talks. In an online appearance in June, Fain repeated his goals and criticized automobile manufacturers for increasing their profits without increasing wages. Fain continued to leave strike action as a possible option leading up to contract negotiations. Contract negotiations began on July 14. Throughout negotiations, Fain has updated members online, including throwing one automaker's proposal in the trash on camera. On August 15, Fain announced a strike vote; it overwhelmingly passed on August 27 with 97 percent voting in favor. UAW has asked for an immediate 20 percent raise and yearly gradual increases totaling an hourly pay increase of 46 percent, the restoration of traditional pension payment plans and retiree health care, a four-day workweek, job protections, and a beneficial transition to electric vehicles. Fain has acknowledged the UAW demands are audacious but argues they are justified, pushing for the reversal of post-2007 wage cuts.

== Course of the strike ==
On September 14, Fain declared that the UAW would simultaneously strike against Ford Motor Company, General Motors, and Stellantis for the first time in the union's history. The initial strike was focused on the Michigan Assembly Plant in Wayne, Michigan, owned by Ford Motor Company; the Toledo Complex in Toledo, Ohio, owned by Stellantis; and Wentzville Assembly in Wentzville, Missouri, owned by General Motors. Approximately 13,000 workers are going on strike as of September. The initially limited scope is intended by the union to stretch the strike fund. The three plants were chosen for their profitability.

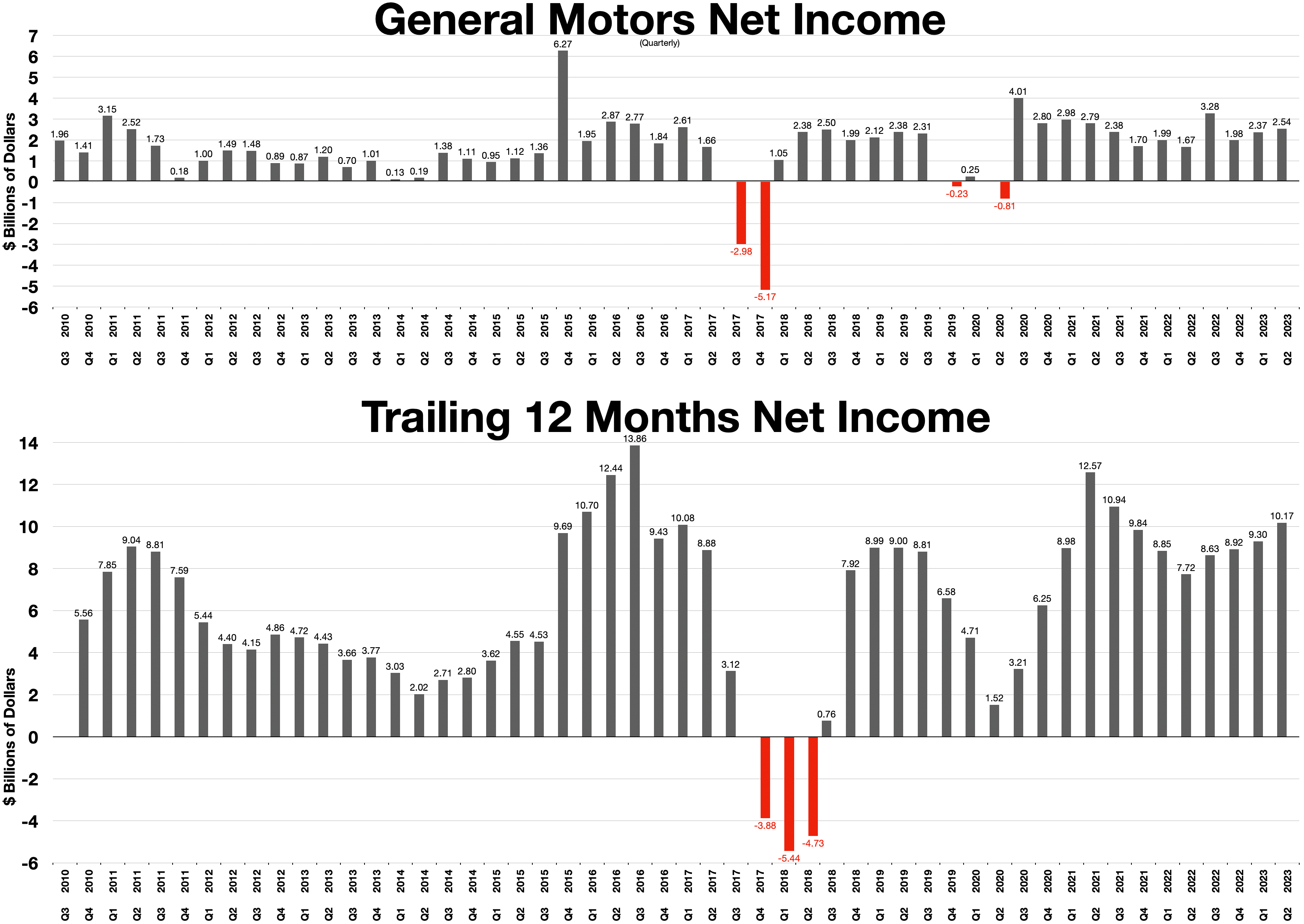
General Motors net income and Trailing 12 months net income

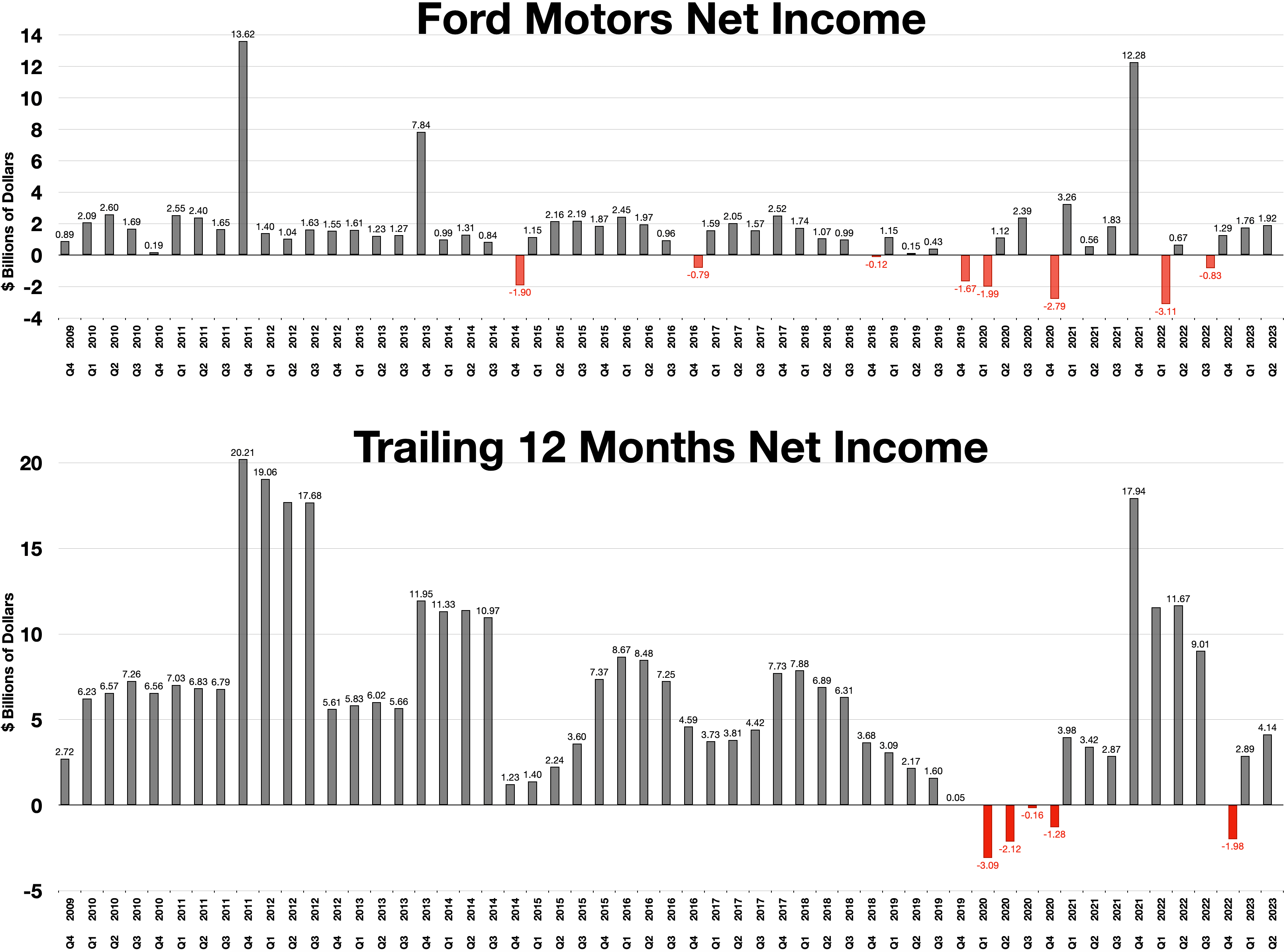
Ford Motors net income and Trailing 12 months net income

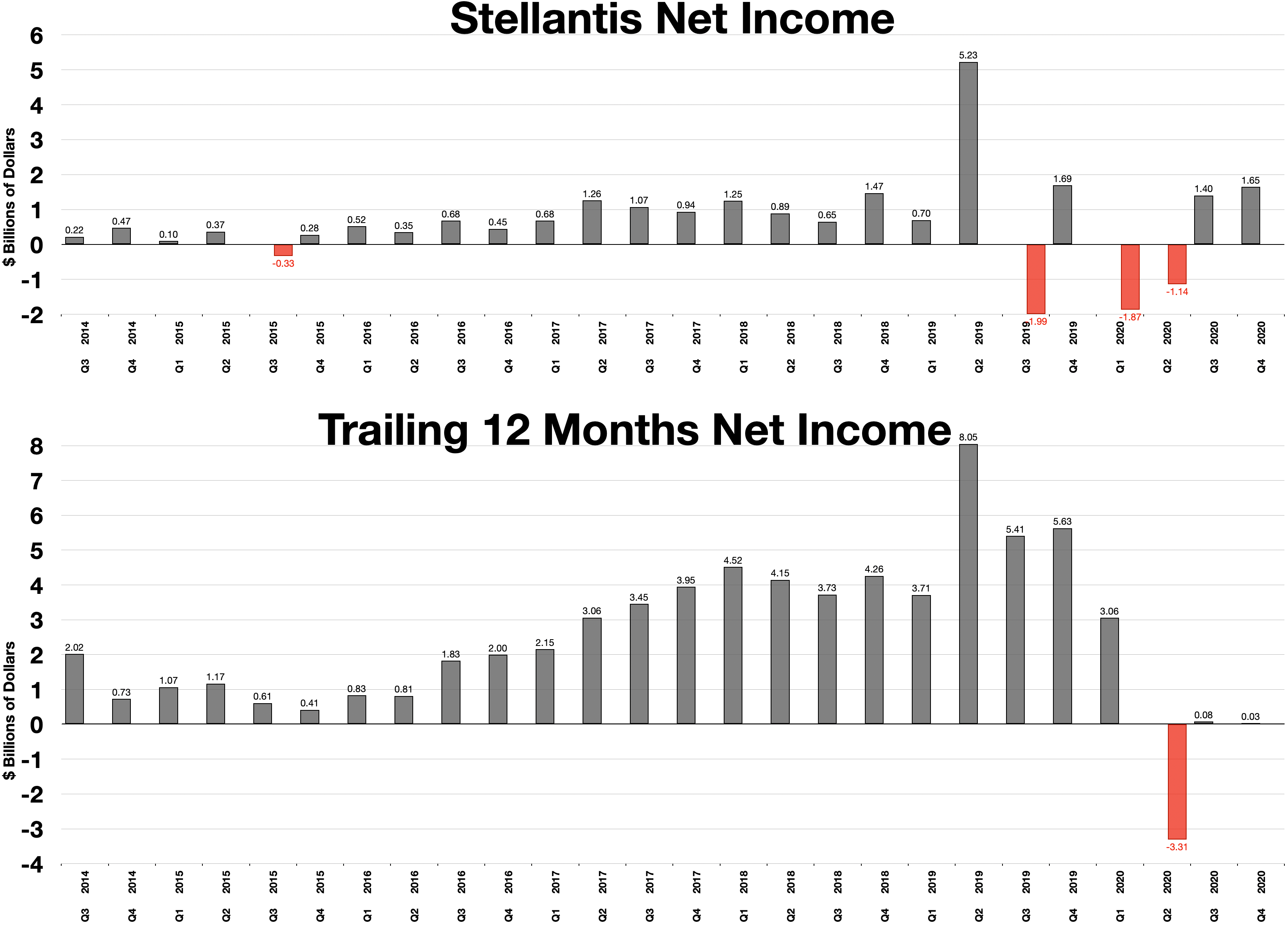
Stellantis net income 2014 - 2020 and Trailing 12 months net income

On September 19, Fain set a new deadline for contract talks. If by Friday, September 22, contract negotiations did not progress significantly, a new set of plants would join the strike. This strategy has been dubbed by Fain a "stand-up" strike, where workers at additional plants will join the strike if talks do not progress. This strategy has been referred to as a new form of rolling strike, in which portions of a company or industry strike at different points, rather than striking all at once. Typically, sections are targeted periodically, moving between workplaces without expanding. In this case, the strike continually expanded from workplace to workplace.

On September 22, strikes expanded with 5,600 workers walking out of 38 part-distribution plants operated by Stellantis and GM. The strike did not include any Ford operated facilities, with Fain stating: "We've made some real progress at Ford. We ... want to recognize that Ford is showing that they are serious about reaching a deal. At GM and Stellantis, it's a different story." Fain also invited President Biden to show solidarity saying, "We invite and encourage everyone who supports our cause to join us on the picket line from our friends and families all the way up to the President of the United States." Hours later, Biden announced his intent to visit Michigan on the 26th, "to join the picket line and stand in solidarity with the men and women of UAW as they fight for a fair share of the value they helped create". The strike was expanded further to 7,000 additional workers on September 29: 4,600 at Ford's Chicago Assembly and 2,300 at GM's Lansing Delta Township Assembly.

On October 11, an additional 8,700 UAW workers at Ford's Kentucky Truck Assembly walked off and joined the strike.

On October 23, 6,800 additional workers walked out at Stellantis's Sterling Heights Assembly, with the UAW considering Stellantis's recent proposal the worst of the three automakers. The next day, on October 24, roughly 5,000 workers at GM's Arlington Assembly joined the strike.

=== Agreements and end to the strike ===
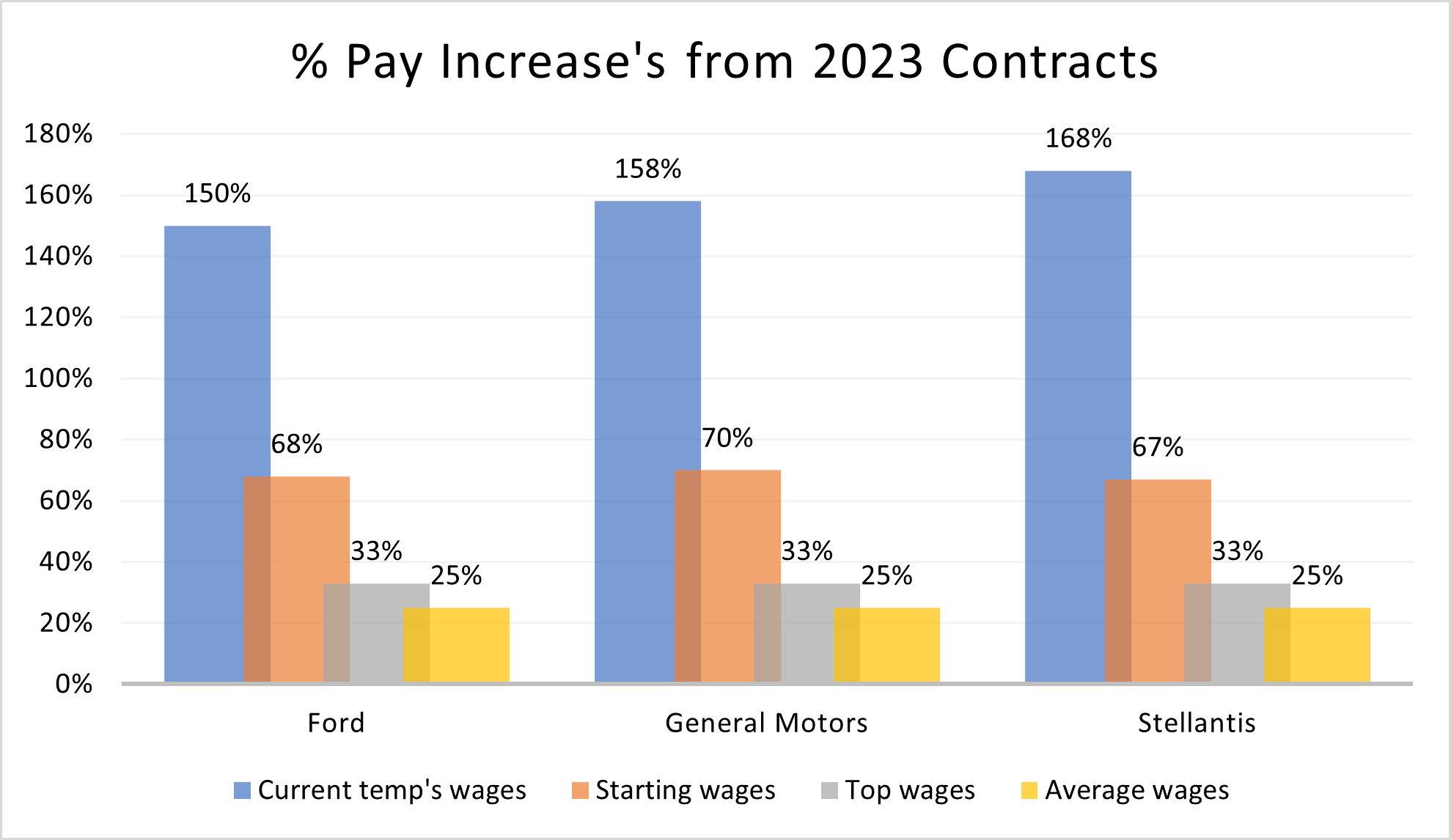

On October 25, a tentative agreement was reached between the UAW and Ford; it includes an 11% wage increase in the first year, and total 25% increase in wages over the 4.5 year contract, a $5,000 ratification bonus and a cost-of-living adjustment. When including cost-of-living adjustments, total pay could be raised by 30%. As part of the agreement, all striking Ford workers will return to the job while the contracts are ratified. Three days later, on October 28, the UAW announced a similar tentative deal with Stellantis; the same day, 4,000 workers at GM's Spring Hill Manufacturing subsequently joined the strike, despite late-night talks on October 27, at which Fain and General Motors CEO Mary Barra were reportedly present. On October 30, the UAW announced a deal with General Motors, leading to a suspension of the strike and a return of all striking workers back to the job.

TA Highlights:
- Ford
- General Motors
- Stellantis

All three contracts also eliminated the two-tier system of wages, wherein some workers were classified as "temporary workers" and paid less. For example, at Ford a temporary worker who previously made $16.67 an hour will now be classified as permanent, and make a minimum of $24.91 an hour. Those who are employed in or before 2023 will earn $40.82 an hour by the end of the contract if they remain, due to reaching full seniority by years. All three contracts are subject to ratification by the union's members; the first vote occurred at Local 900, the first plant to go on strike, with 82% of members voting in favor of the agreement. While UAW members would vote to ratify contracts with Stellantis and Ford by over 69%, General Motors saw a significantly smaller majority, with only just over 54% UAW voters agreeing to ratify their contract.

== Transition to electric vehicles and claims of competitiveness ==
Automakers claim that they need to transition to building electric vehicles to meet government regulations and to remain competitive, and that this transition will require re-investing billions of dollars of their profits. Ford stated that for 2023 it would lose $4.5 billion in its electric vehicle (EV) business.

Foreign, legacy manufacturers and domestic manufacturers which produce only electric vehicles, such as Lucid, Rivian, and Tesla produce their vehicles with non-union workforce. Labor costs for EV-only Tesla are $45/hour. The second largest automaker, Toyota, has a labor cost of $55/hour. The current UAW labor costs are $65/hour. Wells Fargo estimates that the proposed contract by the UAW would raise the average labor cost to $136/hour. Ford, GM, and Stellantis claim that the proposed UAW contract would prevent them from being competitive in the transition to EVs and competing against foreign automakers.

In 2022, president Joe Biden's administration passed the Inflation Reduction Act, which included federal funding and tax incentives for domestic EV manufacturing. Ronald Brownstein of The Atlantic reported that union officials "worry that the companies are using the shift ... to simultaneously shift more of their operations from high-paying union jobs mostly in northern states to lower-paying, nonunion jobs mostly in southern states". Fain asserts that, with the government incentives, "hundreds of billions of our taxpayer dollars ... are helping fund this, and workers cannot continue to be left behind in that equation". The UAW seeks to mandate unionization of battery factories without a vote from factory employees.

== Reactions ==
=== Politicians ===
==== Democratic Party ====
On September 15, the day after the strike began, the UAW held a rally outside Huntington Place in Detroit, which was then hosting the North American International Auto Show. The rally featured speeches from Michigan Governor Gretchen Whitmer, Lieutenant Governor Garlin Gilchrist, and Secretary of State Jocelyn Benson, as well as US Senator Bernie Sanders. Sanders called on the CEOs of Ford, General Motors, and Stellantis to "end [their] greed", addressing each by name. Democratic members of Congress from the Detroit area, including Debbie Dingell, Haley Stevens, Shri Thanedar, and Rashida Tlaib, were also in attendance, voicing support for the strike.

The strike posed a risk to president Joe Biden's commitment to electric vehicles as Biden was running for reelection. Biden's automotive industry liaison Gene Sperling stated that, while he remains committed to electric vehicles, Biden will ensure a "just transition" for union members. On the day of the strike, Biden called for an amelioration with "record contracts" matching "record corporate profits". On September 26, 2023, Biden joined the picket line at a General Motors warehouse in Van Buren Township, Michigan, and delivered comments supporting the striking workers; the appearance made him the first sitting US president to visit a picket line.

Throughout the strike, many other Democratic politicians have voiced their support for striking workers. Many have joined picket lines at participating facilities; among them, US senators Gary Peters, Sherrod Brown, Bob Casey Jr., Dick Durbin, Tammy Duckworth, and John Fetterman; US representatives Cori Bush, Alexandria Ocasio-Cortez, Ro Khanna, Morgan McGarvey, and Elissa Slotkin; Kentucky governor Andy Beshear and lieutenant governor Jacqueline Coleman; Chicago mayor Brandon Johnson; and Louisville mayor Craig Greenberg.

==== Republican Party ====
Former president Donald Trump did not publicly support the strike, instead criticizing UAW leadership and the Biden administration's electric car policy saying "UAW workers being sold down the river by the union in favor of green agenda". Much of his criticism of the UAW centered on comments made by Fain criticizing Trump; he subsequently called on Fain and the UAW to endorse his campaign.

On September 18, Trump's campaign announced that he would give a televised speech to striking autoworkers in Detroit on the evening of September 27, the same night as the second Republican presidential debate in California. The speech was held an hour prior to the debate, at a non-union Drake Enterprises auto parts plant in the Detroit suburb of Clinton Township. In the speech, Trump claimed to have "saved American auto manufacturing", and continued his criticism of Biden, accusing him of "destroying unions" and "shipping American jobs overseas", and claiming that his administration's promotion of electric vehicles would lead to losses for automakers, resulting in a rise in imported vehicles and mass layoffs at US plants. He downplayed the importance of the strike and negotiations, though he did call for automotive workers to be paid higher wages. 400 to 500 Trump supporters were reportedly in attendance; it was unclear, however, how many were striking UAW members.

Kristina Karamo, chairperson of the Michigan Republican Party, similarly criticized the UAW for their support of Democratic candidates, whom she accused of damaging the US economy.

US Senator Tim Scott compared the UAW strike to the 1981 strikes organized by the Professional Air Traffic Controllers Organization and praised former President Ronald Reagan's approach, stating: "He said, you strike, you're fired. Simple concept to me". Fain later filed a complaint against Scott with the National Labor Relations Board on the grounds that, as the employer of campaign staff, his statements reflected a threat against his workers' right to strike and violated the National Labor Relations Act.

US Senators Josh Hawley and JD Vance were the only Republican members of Congress to have joined a picket line during the strike, having appeared at General Motors Wentzville Assembly and Stellantis Toledo Assembly, respectively.

=== Automakers ===
Ford CEO Jim Farley claimed that had the UAW proposal been in effect since 2019, Ford would have gone bankrupt. In response, Fain stated "The cost of labor for a vehicle is 5% ... They could double our wages and not raise the prices ... and they would still make billions of dollars. It's a lie like everything else that comes out of their mouths."

=== Others ===
In an opinion article, Steven Rattner, who served on Barack Obama's Presidential Task Force on the Auto Industry during the government's restructuring of GM and Chrysler (predecessor of Stellantis) associated with their 2008 bankruptcies, stated that while he feels that the auto workers should get raises, they are asking for too much from an industry with thin profit margins that has stagnated relative to the growth of the overall economy.
