= Jean-Claude Parrot =

Canadian trade unionist

National President of the Canadian Union of Postal Workers
- In office 1977–1992
- Preceded by: Joe Davidson
- Succeeded by: Darrell Tingley

Personal details
- Born: 24 July 1936 (age 90) Montreal, Quebec
- Occupation: Postal clerk, trade unionist

Jean-Claude Parrot (born 24 July 1936) is a Canadian trade union activist who was the National President of the Canadian Union of Postal Workers from 1977 to 1992, and its chief negotiator for eighteen years. Parrot led the union through several national postal strikes and was responsible for cultivating the union's reputation as a militant organization that made pathbreaking gains in collective bargaining that would later be adopted by other unions.

== Early life ==
Parrot was born in Montreal. He became a postal clerk in Montreal in 1954.

== Union activism ==
Parrot became CUPW's national negotiator in 1975. The 1975 negotiations led to a 43-day national strike.

During the 1978 negotiations, the Canadian federal government imposed back-to-work legislation. In defiance, postal workers remained on strike for seven days after the legislation took effect. Parrot was eventually jailed for two months in 1979 for refusing to tell postal workers to return to work.

He led postal workers to many victories such as the conversion of Canada Post into a Crown Corporation, breakthroughs in collective bargaining such as paid maternity leave, and CUPW's 1989 victory in a winner-take-all certification vote that doubled the size of the union.

== Canadian Labour Congress ==
Jean-Claude Parrot was elected Executive Vice-President of the Canadian Labour Congress at its 19th Convention in Vancouver in 1992. He was subsequently re-elected to this position in 1994, 1996 and 1999.

== Writings ==
On the fortieth anniversary of the Canadian Union of Postal Workers, Jean-Claude Parrot published his memoirs in a book entitled My Union, My Life: Jean-Claude Parrot and the Canadian Union Of Postal Workers.

Trade union offices
Preceded by Dick Martin	Executive Vice President of the Canadian Labour Congress; 1992–2002; With: Hassan Yussuff (1999–2002)	Succeeded by Barbara Byers; Marie Clarke Walker
