= Teamsters Canada =

Canadian trade union

- Formation: 1976; 50 years ago
- Headquarters: Laval, Quebec, Canada
- Location: Canada
- Members: 125,000
- President: François Laporte
- Parent organization: International Brotherhood of Teamsters
- Website: teamsters.ca

Teamsters Canada is the Canadian wing of the International Brotherhood of Teamsters. Although the Teamsters have been present in Canada since 1903, Teamsters Canada was only established in 1976. The organization represents 125,000 workers in all industries. It is the largest transportation union in the country, and the largest private sector union under federal jurisdiction.

François Laporte officially began his tenure in 2015 as president of Teamsters Canada. He was sworn in by International Brotherhood of Teamsters (IBT) General President James P. Hoffa, General Secretary-Treasurer Ken Hall and other members of the IBT General Executive Board.

== Teamsters Canada Rail Conference ==
In 2004, the Canadian branches of both the Brotherhood of Locomotive Engineers and the Brotherhood of Maintenance of Way Employes voted to merge with the Teamsters Canada. Today there are over 16,000 members of Teamsters Canada work in the rail industry who are represented by the Teamsters Canada Rail Conference.

=== 2024 Canada railroad shutdown ===
In 2024, Teamsters Canada announced a potential strike involving thousands of teamsters at Canadian National Railway and Canada Pacific Kansas City. Over 90% of members voted in favor of the strike, prompting the government to bring the issue to the country's federal labor relations board.

== See also ==
- Canadian Labour Congress
