= 2024 pro-Palestinian strike in Spain =

A one-day strike action took place in Spain on 27 September 2024, led by the CGT trade union federation and multiple other organizations.

== Demands ==
The stated reasons for the strike included actions of Israel such as denying the right of return to Palestinians and continued occupation of Palestinian territories; and both inaction and complicity of Spanish institutions, including the national governments, past and present, such as lack of trade sanctions against Israel and allowing continued sales of weapons to Israel. (Note: Spain has issued no licenses for sales of weapons to Israel since October 7, 2023, and has also blocked ships carrying third-party weapons to Israel from using Spanish ports. There was a transfer of Spanish-made ammunition, worth about EUR 1 million, to Israel in November 2023 which, according to the Secretatiat of State for Trade, was based on a license granted earlier. There were, however, much bigger transfers of weapons in the opposite direction, i.e. from Israeli-owned companies to Spain. Weapons purchased by Spain from Israeli arms companies and Spanish subsidiaries of Israeli arms companies, and contracts awarded to such companies, amounted to about EUR 1 billion since October 7.)

The communiqué referred to the recognition of Palestine by the Spanish government, but described it as merely a symbolic act meant to temporarily satisfy and "demobilize" supporters of Palestine and delay the "implementation of real measures". The communiqué calls on the Spanish government to cut all diplomatic, commercial and military relations with Israel.

== Organizers and supporters ==
The CGT (General Confederation of Labor) is a trade union federation in Spain that has around 100,000 members. Its views are anarcho-syndicalist.

The CGT called for a general strike and was joined by multiple other organizations including the left-wing student union Sindicato de Estudiantes. Large trade unions UGT and CCOO (about 1 million members each) did not join the strike.

== Tactics ==
Strike tactics included picketing and street marches.

The CGT estimated that around 20,000 people took part in "pickets and actions" during the morning of 27 September 2024.

Street marches took place in various localities across Spain during the afternoon. Those in Barcelona and Madrid were joined by 4500 and 6000 people, respectively, according to the authorities. The CGT claimed that the combined number of protesters in all the localities where protests took place was nearly 150,000.
