= Canada Industrial Relations Board =

Federal labour code tribunal

The Canada Industrial Relations Board (CIRB) is an independent tribunal responsible for interpreting and administering the Industrial Relations and Occupational Health and Safety sections of the Canada Labour Code. As of August 2025, the chairperson of the board is Maryse Tremblay.

== Jurisdiction ==
The CIRB's jurisdiction is in regard to about a million employees who are engaged in industries under federal jurisdiction. The sectors under federal jurisdiction include inter-provincial transportation, broadcasting, banking, longshoring, and grain-handling. Also, the CIRB's jurisdiction is private sector employees in Northwest Territories, Yukon, and Nunavut. If an employee or employer is not in this jurisdiction then they may fall under the jurisdiction of their provincial industrial relations board. CIRB is responsible for the interpretation and administration of Part II (Professional Relations) of the Status of the Artist Act on behalf of artists and producers.

== Activities ==
Certifying trade unions, investigating complaints of unfair labour practice, issuing cease and desist orders in cases of unlawful strikes and lockouts, rendering decisions on jurisdictional issues, and dealing with complex situations arising from a sale of business. The CIRB also helps mediate disputes before they result in a strike or lockout.

== See also ==
- Industrial Relations
- Canada Labour Code
- 2024 Canada railway shutdown which involved the CIRB
