= Rolling strike =

Labor action tactic

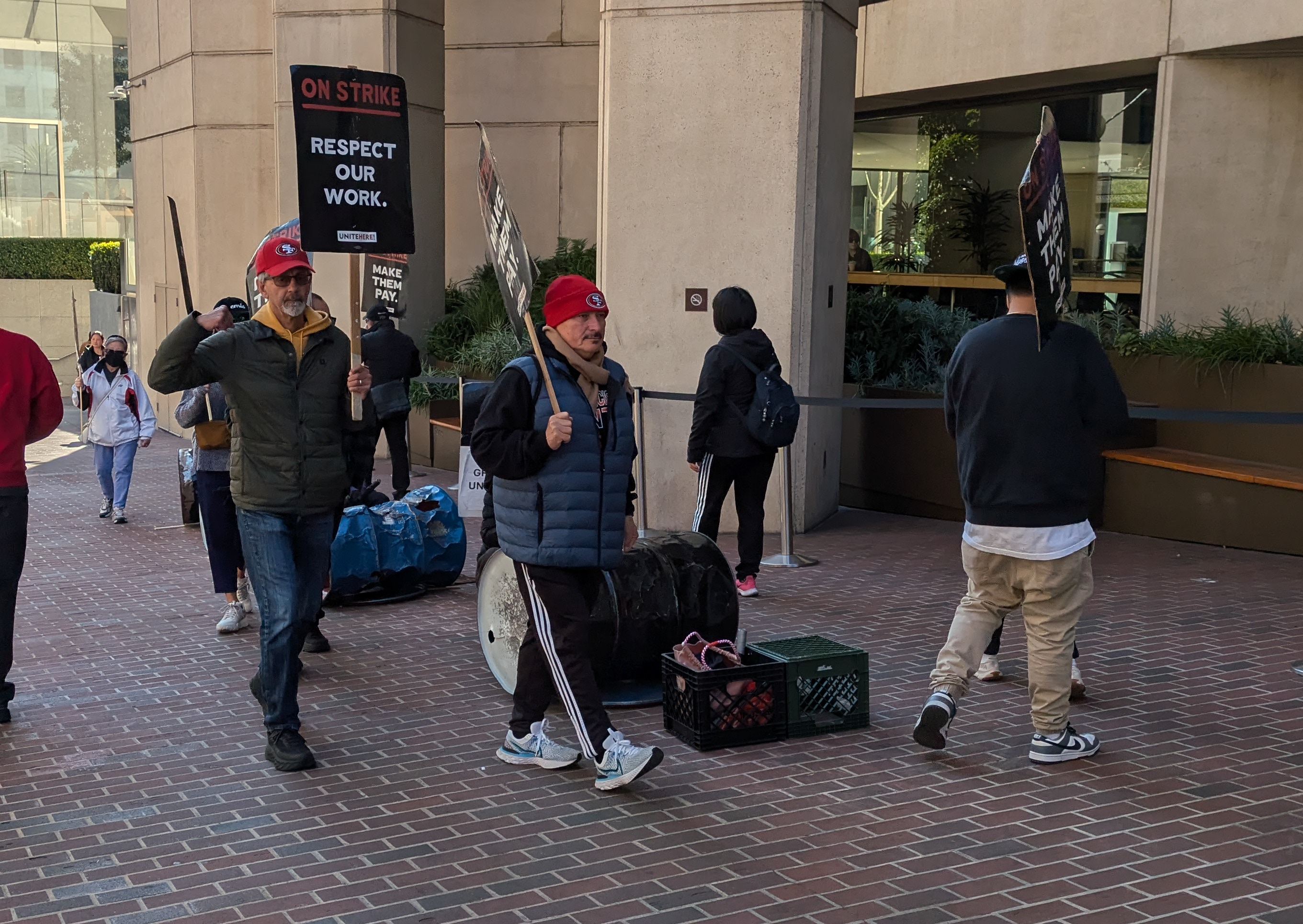
A rolling strike, organized by the union UNITE HERE, in front of the Grand Hyatt San Francisco in 2024.

A rolling strike, also known as a rotating strike, is a targeted strike where some union workers strike while others continue to work. These strikes can spread to other departments or locations as negotiations escalate. Rolling strikes are used to conserve strike funds and to make strike action unpredictable for the employer.

== Rolling rent strike ==
A rolling rent strike is a form of rent strike, which involves paying or not paying rent on a month by month basis. This was in contrast to previous tactics where rent was either completely withheld or paid monthly into an escrow account while on strike.

This strategy was devised by Lester Evens and Richard Levenson, two lawyers closely affiliated with the Met Council, the strategy was intended to force pressure on landlords, by creating conditions with which a landlords willingness to negotiate could determine whether they received or lost rents. Which in some cases was shown to be successful in increasing the bargaining power of strikers. The tactic was also used to delay and hinder the effectiveness of court proceedings against strikers. When ordered to pay rent in escrow by courts, the tenants would instead pay a months rent to the landlord and then withhold the next months rent.

== By location ==
=== United States ===
The Unite Here Local 11 labor union, which represents 32,000 hotel workers in Southern California and Arizona, has used rolling strike actions in contract disputes with hotels in Southern California during the 2023-2024 Los Angeles hotel strike, with workers walking off the job at a few hotels at a time.

The 2023 United Auto Workers strike also used rolling strikes, initially targeting production of the Big Three's most profitable vehicles. Setting negotiation timelines, UAW President Shawn Fain threatened to roll out more strikes if deals were not reached by certain deadlines.

=== Canada ===
The Elementary Teachers' Federation of Ontario performed rotating strikes in February 2020 affecting 170,000 students through one-day strikes. Parents were compensated by the government for missed school days, putting more pressure on negotiations.

== See also ==
- Rolling rent strike
