= 2023 Temple University strike =

Labor strike in Philadelphia, US

- Date: January 31 – March 13, 2023 (1 month, 1 week and 6 days)
- Location: Philadelphia, Pennsylvania, United States
- Caused by: Disagreements over the terms of a new labor contract
- Goals: Annual wage increases of 50 percent in the first year and 6 percent in each of the subsequent three years; Health care coverage for family members and dependents of graduate student employees; Improvements to the grievance procedure; Improved bereavement and parental leave policies
- Methods: Picketing; Rally; Strike action; Walkout
- Result: Union and university agreed to a new labor contract with provisions that include: Adjustment of graduate student workers' annual pay to $24,000 for the first year and $1,000 increases in each of the next three years; One-time bonus pay of $500; Health care coverage of up to 25 percent for family members and dependents of graduate student workers; Increased days for bereavement and parental leave; Changes to the university's grievance procedures

Parties
Temple University Graduate Students Association	Temple University

Lead figures
	Jason Wingard, president of Temple University

The 2023 Temple University strike was a labor dispute between the Temple University Graduate Students Association (TUGSA), a graduate student employee union that represented roughly 750 graduate student employees at Temple University, and the university administration, led by President Jason Wingard. The strike began on January 31, 2023, and lasted until March 13, when union members voted to ratify a tentative agreement brokered between the negotiators for both parties.

In early 2022, the existing labor contract between the union and university expired without a replacement. While the two parties disagreed on several issues, including bereavement and parental leave and the grievance policy, the main point of contention regarded wage increases. The union sought an increase of 50 percent in the first year and 6 percent increases in subsequent years, but the university countered with annual wage increases of no greater than 2 percent. As an agreement was not reached, union members voted to authorize a strike, which began on January 31 of the following year. Over the course of the strike, TUGSA members held multiple rallies and demonstrations across Temple's campus and attracted support from both local and national politicians. On February 8, the university announced that they would be rescinding the tuition remission granted to graduate student employees, a move which provoked public criticism of the university and led to the union filing an unfair labor practice charge against the university with the National Labor Relations Board. On March 9, a tentative agreement was reached that was voted into effect by the union on March 13, bringing an immediate end to the strike. Terms of the contract were generally considered a compromise between the two side's initial proposals and saw first-year pay increases of between 30 and 40 percent for workers, amongst other changes regarding policies such as grievance procedures and time off.

Following the strike, President Wingard resigned from his position, with several publications indicating that his decision was due at least in part to criticism over his handling of the strike. Additionally, several publications noted that the Temple strike and its settlement were viewed positively by student labor activists at other nearby universities. In general, the strike has been viewed as being part of a broader nationwide labor movement amongst graduate student workers in the United States.

== Background ==
=== Graduate students' union at Temple University ===
Temple University is an American public university in Philadelphia, Pennsylvania. In 2022, roughly 750 graduate student employees were members of the Temple University Graduate Students Association (TUGSA) Local 6290, a labor union which had been established about 20 years earlier and was an affiliate of the American Federation of Teachers (AFT). These graduate students were employed by the university as either teaching assistants (TAs) or research assistants and as such had multiple responsibilities that included helping in conducting research, grading classes, and teaching introductory and general education classes. The union represented approximately 60 percent of the graduate student workers at Temple, with the total number of graduate students at the university numbering roughly 10,000.

=== Labor contract negotiations ===
In February 2022, the labor contract that existed between the union and the university expired without a contract, and that same month, the two sides began negotiations on the terms of a new contract. By November, despite months of negotiations, the union and university had not come to an agreement regarding a new contract.

The union was requesting an immediate wage increase of roughly 50 percent for the first year of the new contract and subsequent 6 percent annual wage increases for the next three years. Additionally, the union wanted changes to the employees' grievance procedures, improved bereavement and parental leave policies, and health care for the family members and dependents of graduate student employees, in addition to some other requests. At the time, graduate student employees at Temple were earning an annual stipend of between $19,000 and $20,000 on average, below the living wage level for Philadelphia, and the union justified their proposal, which would have raised that average to about $32,807 in the first year, by stating that it would constitute a cost of living adjustment. According to reporting from The Temple News, the university's student newspaper, graduate student workers had been affected acutely by the then-ongoing 2021–2022 inflation surge in the United States.

The university's counterproposal was for a 2 percent wage increase in the first year, 1.75 percent wage increases in the second and third years, and a 1.5 percent increase in the contract's fourth year. In a statement, the university noted that the graduate student workers were officially part-time employees who worked an average of 20 hours per week for nine months of the year, with the current stipend equating to an hourly wage of about $25, and received full benefits for the entirety of the year. Additionally, the university pointed out that graduate student workers also received free tuition, which the university said was a value of approximately $20,000 per year. A member of the union's negotiating committee also expressed disappointment with the university for only being willing to negotiate with TUGSA on matters regarding wages. Speaking later about the situation, President Kimmika Williams-Witherspoon of the faculty senate stated that the university was in an awkward position due to an overall 6.4 percent decline in enrollment at Temple, which she said had made operations at the university more difficult.

=== Move towards strike action ===
On November 11, 2022, a majority of TUGSA members participated in a vote and, with 99 percent in favor, authorized the union's negotiating committee to call for a strike action if they felt it was necessary. The vote did not establish a trigger date or deadline for calling a strike, and as the university and union had another negotiation session planned for November 17, it was unlikely that the strike would be called before that date. An article in The Philadelphia Inquirer noted that a strike at that time would be disruptive due to how late in the semester it was, but the university released a statement saying that they had plans in place to lessen the disruption that a strike would cause, including having faculty members, professors, and some undergraduate students fill in for striking graduate students. The strike would be the first in TUGSA's history and one of the first at the university in over a decade. The last major strike at the university involved nurses at the Temple University Hospital in 2010, while the last strike involving faculty at Temple occurred in 1990.

This move towards a possible strike action was part of a larger wave of labor disputes and organizing efforts at universities that had been occurring since 2021, with labor historian Heather Ann Thompson saying that the upsurge in unionization efforts, despite a broader long-term decline in unionization in the United States, coincided with an increased reliance from universities on the work of TAs and adjunct professors. A January 2023 article in Bloomberg Law reporting that, in 2022, there were 15 strikes conducted by graduate students, professors, and other academic workers in the United States, with the most notable being a strike at the University of California system that involved about 48,000 workers. In addition to the strikes, many universities had instituted substantial wage increases for their graduate student workers, with the University of Pennsylvania (also located in Philadelphia) agreeing in December 2022 to raise its minimum wage for doctoral students from $30,547 to $38,000—the largest single increase in the university's history.

== Course of the strike ==
=== Start of the strike ===
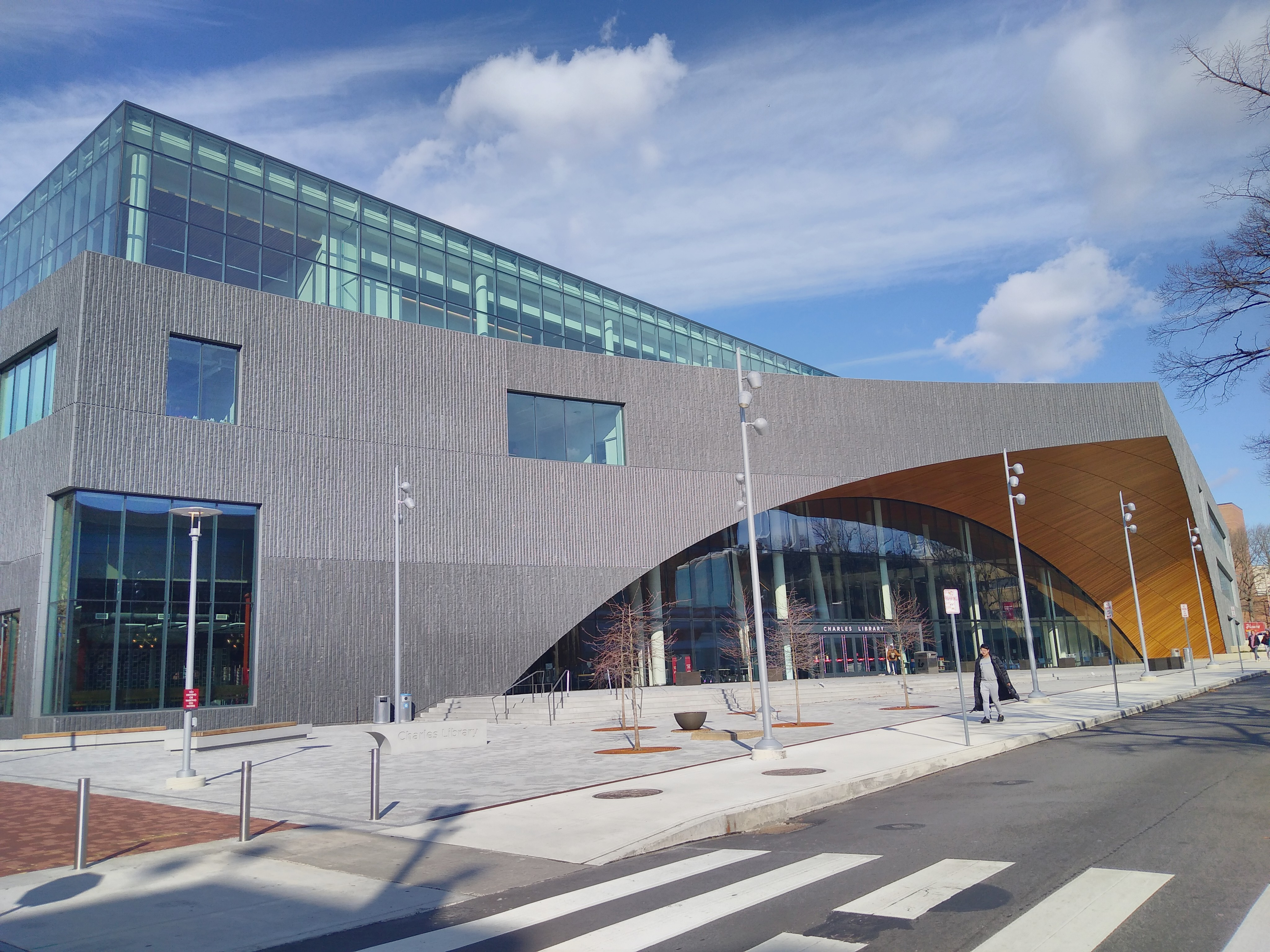
On the first day of the strike, graduate student workers held a rally outside of Charles Library (pictured 2020).

On the morning of Tuesday, January 31, 2023, after about a year of negotiating, the union announced the start of the strike. Striking graduate students began picketing and distributed pro-strike flyers to other collegians, some of whom expressed support for the strikers. At around 2:15 p.m., before a scheduled meeting of the Temple University board of trustees, the union held a rally outside of the university's Charles Library that was attended by about 100 strike supporters. Pennsylvania State Senator Sharif Street was a speaker at the rally, where he voiced his support for the strike and led the protestors in a chant demanding higher pay. The picketing lasted until about 4 p.m., and the union announced plans for further picketing throughout the rest of the week. The strike ultimately caused the university to cancel some affected classes.

Union leaders stated from the beginning that the strike would be open-ended and indefinite, lasting until the union and university came to an agreement that they found satisfactory. At the time, the university's counterproposal to the union included 3 percent annual wage increases that would raise the average pay to $22,000 by 2026, in addition to one-time payments of up to $500. With regards to other points of contention, the university was offering to increase the number of parental paid leave days from 5 to 10, while the union was requesting 45. Additionally, in a statement from Provost Gregory Mandel, the university stated that they would "provide additional bereavement and provide healthcare benefits coverage" to graduate students. While health care coverage was available for free to graduate students, they had to pay for dependents' coverage, which the union said could amount to up to 80 percent of a graduate student workers' salary and was especially difficult for students from outside of the United States, as they were required to have their family covered in order to remain in the country.

=== Strike continues into February ===
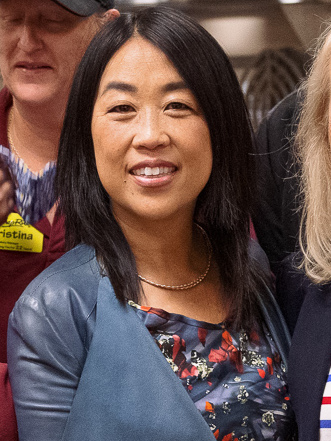
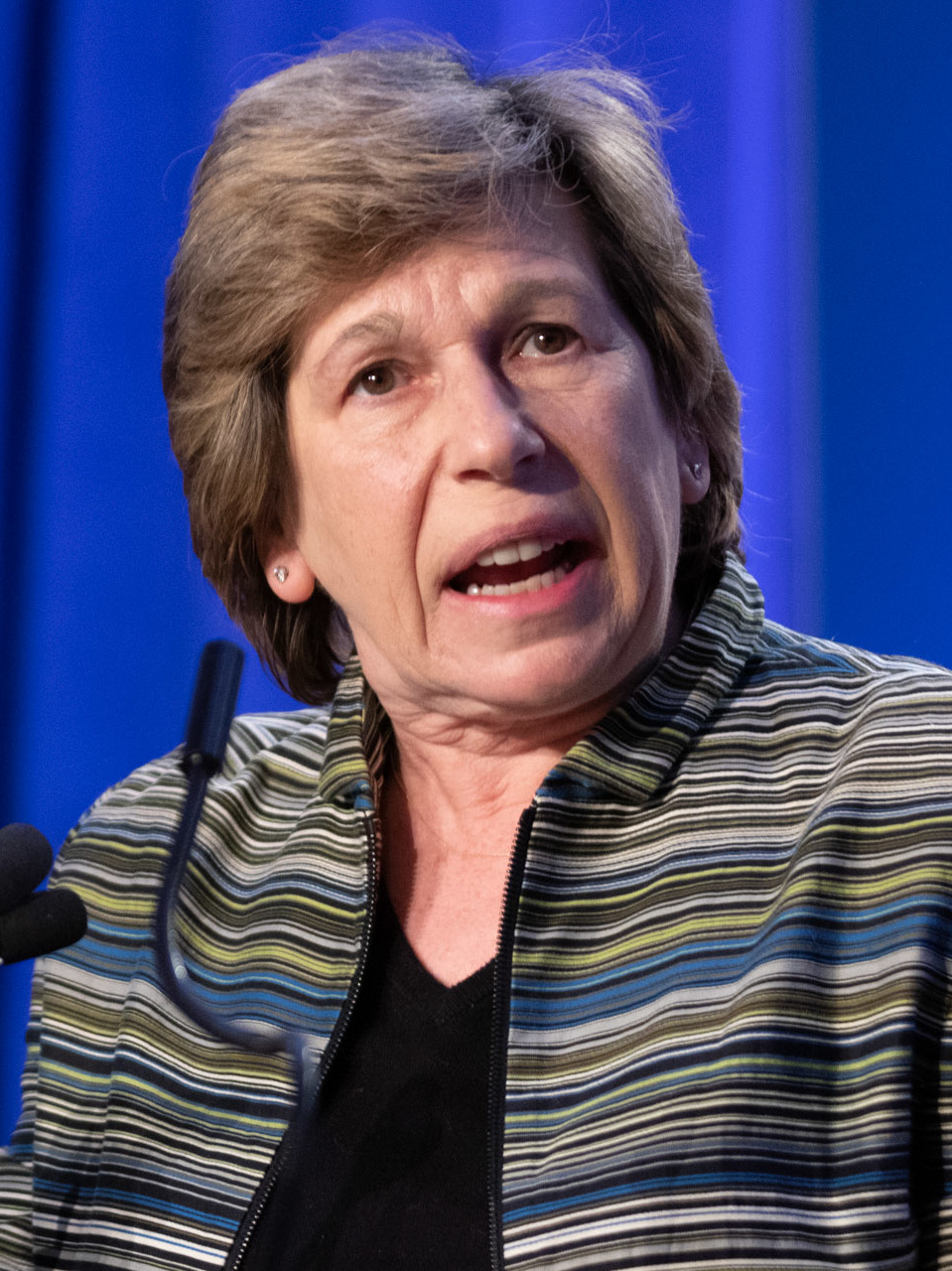
On February 2, local politician Helen Gym (left) and American Federation of Teachers President Randi Weingarten spoke at a pro-strike rally on Temple's campus.

On February 2, TUGSA held a rally on Temple's campus that included supportive speeches from local politicians and national labor leaders, including former Philadelphia city councilmember and then-mayoral candidate Helen Gym and AFT President Randi Weingarten. Additionally, in a statement to The Philadelphia Inquirer, President Jeffrey Doshna of the Temple Association of University Professionals (TAUP), the university's faculty union, said that, while the union could not officially participate in the strike, many faculty members were supportive of the graduate students' union and were declining to take on additional work as a show of support for the strikers.

On that same day, strikers were notified by the university that if they did not tell the chairperson of their academic department that they would return to work then they would lose their income, their benefits, and their free tuition. A union representative responded by saying that they were disappointed but not surprised by the announcement and that the union had been preparing for this. By the second week of the strike, Temple stated that roughly 80 percent of the university's graduate student employees were continuing to work, saying that 550 graduate students were continuing to work while roughly 120, mostly from the College of Liberal Arts, were the ones striking. However, this number was disputed by a representative for TUGSA, who said that the actual number of strikers was at least twice that and continuing to grow. That same week, the two parties entered into mediation. Around that same time, fliers began to be circulated around campus advocating for a general student walkout on February 15 in support of the strikers.

=== Temple rescinds free tuition ===
On February 8, Temple's bursar's office sent a notice to striking graduate student workers that said they must pay the full cost of their tuition by March 9 or they would have a $100 late fee applied to their account, which would prohibit them from registering for any more classes. In a statement defending their decision to revoke the graduate students' free tuition, the university said:

"In accordance with Pennsylvania law, those TUGSA members who have chosen not to work are no longer entitled to their compensation and work-related benefits, which include tuition remission, when they are on strike and not performing work for the university. Because striking workers are not entitled to tuition remission, they have been notified of their obligation to make arrangements to pay their tuition, consistent with how the university treats other students who have unpaid tuition obligations."

In addition to this, strikers also stated that the university had begun cutting benefits, with one striker saying that Temple had begun deactivating the health care accounts for some graduate student workers. In response, the union announced that they would be filing an unfair labor practice charge against the university with the National Labor Relations Board.

The decision drew criticism from many parties, with William Herbert, executive director of the National Center for the Study of Collective Bargaining in Higher Education, saying, "A threat of a retaliatory measure in response to a strike has occurred before, but it is frequently counterproductive. It can exacerbate the conflict, lengthen its duration, and lead to greater labor and community support for the strike". Labor historian Heather Ann Thompson, in an opinion piece published via CNN's website, was highly critical of the university's decision, saying, "no university has yet made the decision to go right for the jugular of its employee union in quite the sinister the way that Temple University just has".

"If Temple can afford to pay its football coach $2 million per year, it can afford to pay its grad student workers a living wage and decent benefits."

— United States Senator Bernie Sanders expressing his support for TUGSA in a tweet

Following the announcement, Matthew Ford, a lead negotiator for TUGSA, announced that more graduate student workers were joining the strike. On February 9, the Philadelphia City Council passed a resolution introduced by Councilmember Isaiah Thomas expressing support for TUGSA and urging the university to come to an agreement with the union. At the time, several national politicians had similarly expressed support for the union, including United States Senators Bob Casey Jr., John Fetterman, and Bernie Sanders.

=== Resumed negotiations and tentative agreement ===
On February 14, the two parties returned to negotiations, with both sides calling the meeting "productive", though a member of the union's negotiating committee stated that they were still far apart on many key issues. That same day, strikers held a rally on campus that involved several members of the Pennsylvania House of Representatives, including Danilo Burgos and Malcolm Kenyatta. Also on February 14, the editorial board of The Temple News put out a statement expressing their support for the strike and advocating for students to voice their support as well through methods such as skipping classes with striking TAs and engaging in the student walkout on February 15. On that day, about 1,000 people, mainly students and faculty members, participated in the walkout and subsequent rally, which was co-organized by TUGSA and the Philadelphia branch of Socialist Alternative and resulted in traffic long part of Broad Street being shut down.

On February 17, the union and university announced that a tentative agreement on a new contract had been reached by the two negotiating teams, with the union stating that the agreement would soon be presented for a ratification vote by its members. According to reporting from The Temple News, the agreement would see the university reinstate the strikers' health benefits, tuition remission, and single-person healthcare coverage. Additionally, the university guaranteed that the minimum wages for its graduate student employees would increase in annual increments of 10 percent, 5 percent, 2.5 percent, and 2.25 percent over the next four years and that graduate student workers would receive a one-time payment of $1,000 following the end of the strike. In exchange, the union would rescind unfair labor practice charges they had raised against the university and would drop their demands for health care coverage for families and dependents. However, the union specified that, until the agreement was officially ratified, the strike would continue. Voting amongst the union members began on February 20 and continued into the following day.

On February 21, almost 400 people, representing 83 percent of eligible members, voted on the agreement, with 352 (over 92 percent) voting against it and about 30 voting in favor. Following this vote, the strike continued, and on February 28, a rally that saw about 300 undergraduate students march in support of the strike took place on the university's campus.

=== Criticism against Temple University President Jason Wingard ===
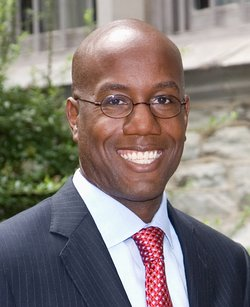
Temple University President Jason Wingard (pictured 2016) faced criticism from many faculty members and students over his handling of the strike.

Around this same time, Temple University President Jason Wingard began to experience heightened criticism over his administration of the university, including his handling of the strike and concerns over safety on Temple's campus, with The Philadelphia Inquirer publishing an opinion article with the headline: "Temple is a campus in crisis. Jason Wingard is the wrong choice to fix it.". On February 28, in addition to the strike rally, several dozen students organized a separate rally on campus to draw attention to a perceived increase in crime on Temple's campus following the murder of a campus police officer the previous month and a lack of action from Temple's administration to address the issue. On March 2, members of the TAUP held a meeting to discuss holding a vote of no confidence on Wingard and other senior members of the university's leadership. While the meeting involved approximately 600 faculty members and lasted 90 minutes, the union did not come to a decision at that time, instead leaving the option open for further discussion. The following week, TAUP announced that a vote to hold a no-confidence vote would take place on March 17.

=== Continued strike action into March ===
On March 6, TUGSA members traveled to Pennsylvania's state capital of Harrisburg in order to talk to politicians in an effort to foster more public support for the strike. The following day, two days before the deadline for striking employees to pay their tuition or face a late fee and the inability to register for classes, the two sides met for another round of negotiations. Following the meeting, both sides stated that progress had been made in negotiations, with the university stating that health insurance subsidies would be restored for striking employees effectively immediately and that another round of negotiations would take place the next day.

Following this round of negotiations, on March 9, it was announced that a new tentative agreement had been reached between the two sides, with voting amongst union members to commence the following day and the final vote expected to be announced that Monday, March 13. Unlike with the last tentative agreement, wherein the negotiating team presented the proposal for vote without taking an official stance on whether or not they support it, union leadership announced their full support for the new agreement. While specifics of the deal were not initially made available, the university stated in a release that the four-year proposal would see minimum annual salaries for the graduate student workers increase to $24,000 and would eliminate different pay tiers that existed wherein employees in certain colleges or schools were paid different rates than others. Additionally, the contract included increases in parental and bereavement leave, allowances for international travel for some students, a partial health care subsidy for dependents, and a one-time payment of $500 for union members.

=== End of the strike ===
On March 13, TUGSA announced that the proposed deal had been approved by the union's rank and file members with a vote of 344 for and 8 against (representing roughly 98 percent voting in favor), thus bringing an end to the strike. Provisions regarding wages in the new contract, which went into effect immediately after the vote, included an increase in the annual pay for the graduate student workers to $24,000 for the current academic year (retroactively starting on January 1), annual raises of $1,000 over the next three years, and a one-time bonus pay of $500. In total, this would result in minimum pay increases of between 30 and 40 percent for the employees, depending on their initial base pay, over the course of the contract's lifespan, which would last until 2026. As with the previous tentative agreement, the contract would also put an end to the tiered system of pay, replacing it with one standard tier.

Concerning other benefits, the contract would allow the employees to have a 25 percent health care coverage for dependents, an increase in paid parental leave from five business days to 21 calendar days, five additional days of bereavement leave for international graduate student workers, changes to the grievance system that would allow a meeting with the university as the first step in the process, and the creation of a joint committee composed of members of the university administration and union to revise work guidelines. Additionally, the tuition remission that the university had rescinded during the strike would be restored.

== Aftermath ==
=== Resignation of President Wingard ===
Several days after the conclusion of the strike, on March 21, TAUP stated that they would be holding no-confidence votes against several Temple administrators, including President Wingard. Reporting on the decision, journalist Susan Snyder of The Philadelphia Inquirer stated that "the administration’s handling of the graduate student negotiations may have been the impetus for considering a vote". Reports from Philadelphia magazine and The New York Times similarly stated that the strike had negatively affected Wingard's perception among the university's faculty, with the latter saying that it had "hobbled" his presidency. Ultimately, Wingard opted to resign as president in an announcement made on March 28.

=== Changes in classrooms affected by the strike ===
During the course of the strike, the university hired several replacement instructors to take over classroom duties for striking graduate student employees. Due to these changes and others associated with the strike, such as the decision to make several classes online-only, the university stated that they gave students in these classes the opportunity to drop the classes without penalty and sign up for other classes past the normal deadline. Following the strike, several graduate students who had had their TA positions taken over by a replacement during the labor dispute stated that they were not able to return to their positions, which had been given to the replacements for the duration of the academic year. Concerning this, the university put out a statement reading, "To ensure continuity and to minimize further disruption to the students, we have elected to keep many of these instructors in place, and the returning instructors are instead being assigned new courses, research, or other academic responsibilities. There are some sections where striking instructors are returning as the instructor of record". This decision drew criticism from several undergraduate students and graduate student employees.

=== Later labor developments at other universities ===
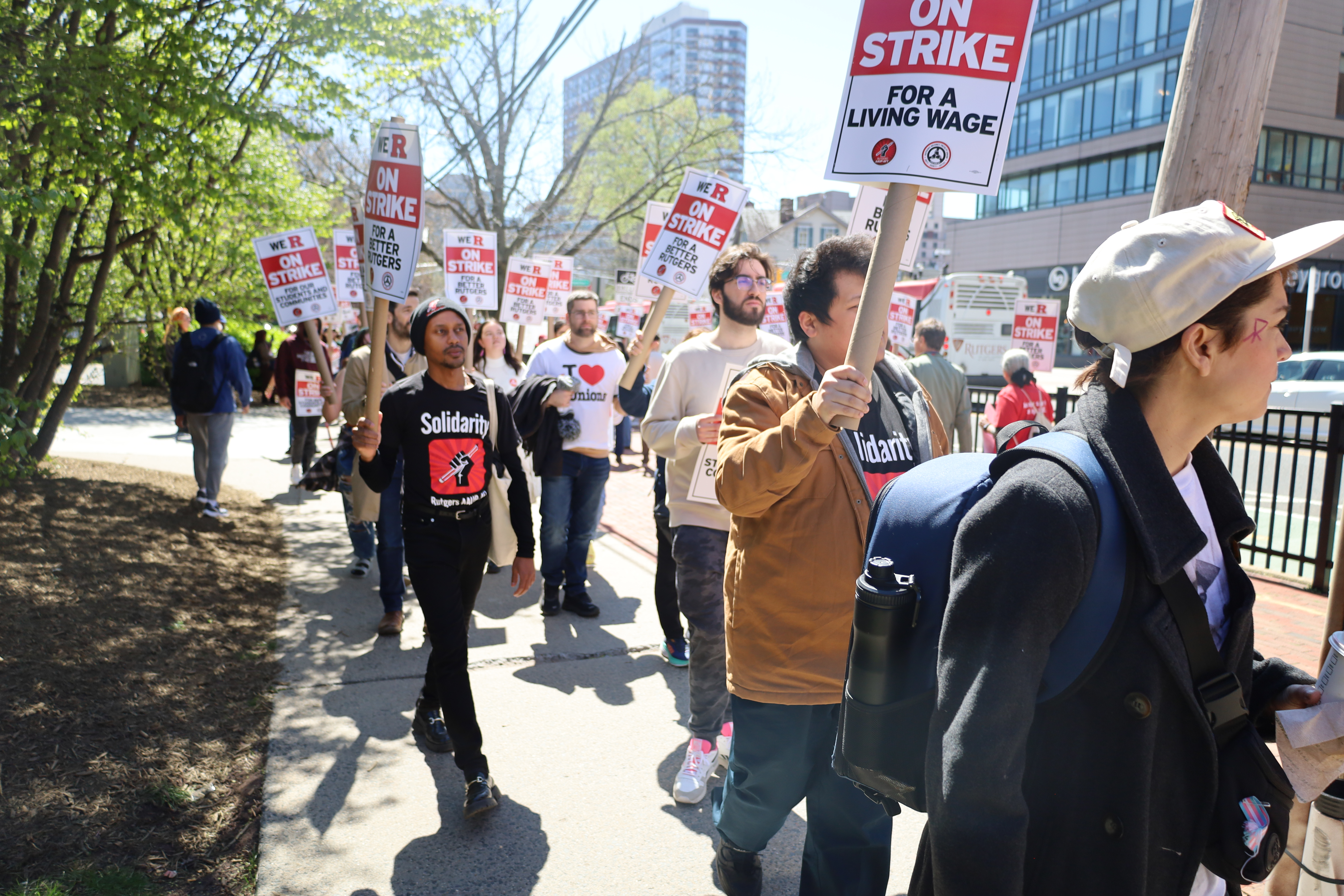
A union official representing graduate student workers at Rutgers University stated that TUGSA's settlement "[set] a really good precedent for us if we need to go on strike", which occurred later that year (strike pictured).

According to a March 2023 article published in The Philadelphia Inquirer, student labor activists at several nearby universities expressed optimism over the outcome of the Temple strike and believed that similar labor disputes at their respective universities could result in similarly successful results, a phenomenon that the newspaper labeled "The Temple Effect". During the strike, 1,400 workers in the University of Pennsylvania Health System filed a unionization petition, with one organizer at the health system stating that the Temple strike was "inspiring". A graduate student at Pennsylvania State University, whose graduate student workers were at the time exploring options regarding unionization, stated regarding TUGSA, "It’s impossible to not be inspired by them". A graduate student and union official at Rutgers University, discussing the possibility of a graduate student strike at that institution (which would become a reality several days later with the 2023 Rutgers University strike) stated that the Temple settlement "sets a really good precedent for us if we need to go on strike". In total, several publications have noted that the Temple strike can be viewed as part of a larger trend of unionization efforts and strikes that affected surrounding area.

== See also ==
- Strikes during the COVID-19 pandemic
- Timeline of strikes in 2023
