= Timeline of strikes in 2023 =

Strikes in 2023

A number of labour strikes, labour disputes, and other industrial actions occurred in 2023. In the United States, the series of strikes has also been referred to as "hot labor summer," a play on Hot Girl Summer.

== Background ==
A labor strike is a work stoppage, caused by the mass refusal of employees to work, usually in response to employee grievances, such as low pay or poor working conditions. Strikes can also take place to demonstrate solidarity with workers in other workplaces or to pressure governments to change policies.

== Timeline ==
=== Continuing strikes from 2022 ===
- 2022–2023 HarperCollins strike;
- 2022–2023 National Health Service strikes;
- 2021–2023 Stagecoach strikes;
- 2018–2023 UK higher education strikes;
- 2022–2023 United Kingdom postal workers strikes;
- 2022–2023 United Kingdom railway strikes;
- 2021–2023 Warrior Met Coal strike;

=== January ===
- 2023 French pension reform unrest;
- 2023 Israeli judicial reform protests;
- 2023 Lebanon teachers strike;
- 2023 Temple University strike

=== February ===
- 2023 Alaskan school bus drivers strike;
- 2023 Medieval Times strike
- 2023 Canadian women’s soccer labour dispute;
- 2023 Palestinian teachers strike;

=== March ===
- 2023 Fraser Valley transit strike;
- 2023 German public transport strike;
- 2023 New Zealand teachers strike;
- Tempi train crash protests;
- 2023 transport strike in the Philippines;

=== April ===
- 2023 Canadian federal worker strike;
- 2023 Los Angeles teachers strike;
- 2023 Nigerian airport strikes;
- 2023 Rutgers University strike;
- 2023 Stockholm train strike;
- 2023 UNRWA strike;

=== May ===
- 2023 Oakland teachers strike;
- 2023 Writers Guild of America strike;
- 2023 Romanian teachers' strike;
- 2023 Thüringer Waldquell strike;
- 2023 Ulyanovsk Automobile Plant wildcat strike;

=== June ===
- 2023 Gannett strike;
- 2023 Hydro Ottawa strike;
- 2023 Le Journal du Dimanche strike - strike by the staff of Le Journal du Dimanche after far-right journalist Geoffroy Lejeune was appointed the newspaper's editor-in-chief;
- 2023 Starbucks strike;
- 2023 Wabtec strike;

=== July ===
- 2023 BC Port strike
- 2023 SAG-AFTRA strike

=== August ===
- 2023 Cape Town taxi strike;
- 2023 Irn-Bru strike;
- 2023 Robert Wood Johnson University Hospital strike;
- 2023 Sogo & Seibu strike - strike at the flagship Seibu Department Store in Tokyo in protest over the store's sale to the American Fortress Investment Group, representing the first strike at a major department store in Japan in over 60 years;

=== September ===
- 2023 Chevron Australia strike - strike at the three liquefied natural gas facilities of the Chevron Corporation in Australia, representing around 5% of global LNG production;
- 2023 Prince Albert city workers strike - the first strike of Prince Albert, Saskatchewan city workers in history, with striking workers represented by the Canadian Union of Public Employees;
- 2023 Pakistan traders strike;
- 2023 Royal Society of Arts strike - the first strike in the history of the Royal Society of Arts;
- 2023 Scottish school strikes;
- 2023 South Korean rail strike;
- 2023 South Korean teachers protests;
- 2023 Sri Lankan rail strike;
- 2023 United Auto Workers strike
- 2023 Las Vegas Culinary Union strike

=== October ===
- 2023 Detroit casino strike;
- 2023 Kaiser Permanente strike
- 2023 Mexico federal court strike;
- 2023 Seenigama Devale strike;
- 2023 Tesla Sweden strike;
- 2023 UAW Mack Truck strike
- 2023 Iceland women's strike;

=== December ===
- 2023-2024 Comox Valley Transit Strike

== Commentary ==
A study done by the German Institute of Economic and Social Research found that the number of days lost to labour disputes in Germany in 2023 was a record, with 1,52 million working days lost over 312 disputes. The Institute's study pointed the cause of the disputes primarily towards inflation and the cost-of-living crisis.

According to Cornell University's Labor Action Tracker, there were 393 strikes in the United States in 2023, up to the end of November, marking the year with the most strikes involving over 1000 workers since 2013. Sharon Block of the Harvard Law School describe 2023 as "the most active period [for labour] that I've seen in my career," saying that there was "a shift among US workers about what's acceptable in terms of conditions."

== See also ==
- List of strikes
- Great Resignation
