= 2023 Medieval Times strike =

2023 labor dispute in California

- Date: November 22, 2023 (9 months, 1 week and 4 days)
- Location: Buena Park, California, United States
- Caused by: Low pay and concerns from performers over staffing levels and security
- Goals: Increased pay; Improved staffing; Increased security
- Methods: Picketing; Strike action; Walkout
- Result: Employees returned to work without labor contract; union later decertified

Parties
American Guild of Variety Artists: Medieval Times Performers United	Medieval Times Dinner and Tournament

On February 11, 2023, unionized performers at the Medieval Times location in Buena Park, California, initiated a strike action by performing a walkout and picketing outside of the establishment. The strike lasted for over nine months before the employees returned to work on November 22, without a labor contract in place.

Starting in 2022, performers who worked for Medieval Times, an American dinner theater company, began to organize as "Medieval Times Performers United", with the American Guild of Variety Artists representing the workers. By the end of the year, workers at the Buena Park and Lyndhurst, New Jersey, locations had unionized and began negotiating with the company over a labor contract, with the main concerns of the employees being low pay, low staffing levels, and improved security. However, the negotiations were fruitless, and in February of the following year, about half of the 50 union members in Buena Park went on strike.

Over the next several months, the strikers held a picket line in the parking lot outside of the location and engaged in sporadic discussions with company management. However, by June, many of the strikers had taken on second jobs to support themselves, and picket line attendance had declined significantly. The last discussions between the company and union were in September, and in November, with no substantial progress made, the union agreed to return to work without a contract. Following this, several employees at both unionized locations began to express anti-union sentiments and worked with the National Right to Work Legal Defense Foundation to decertify the union. On March 13, 2024, the union announced that they would not be representing Medieval Times workers.

== Background ==
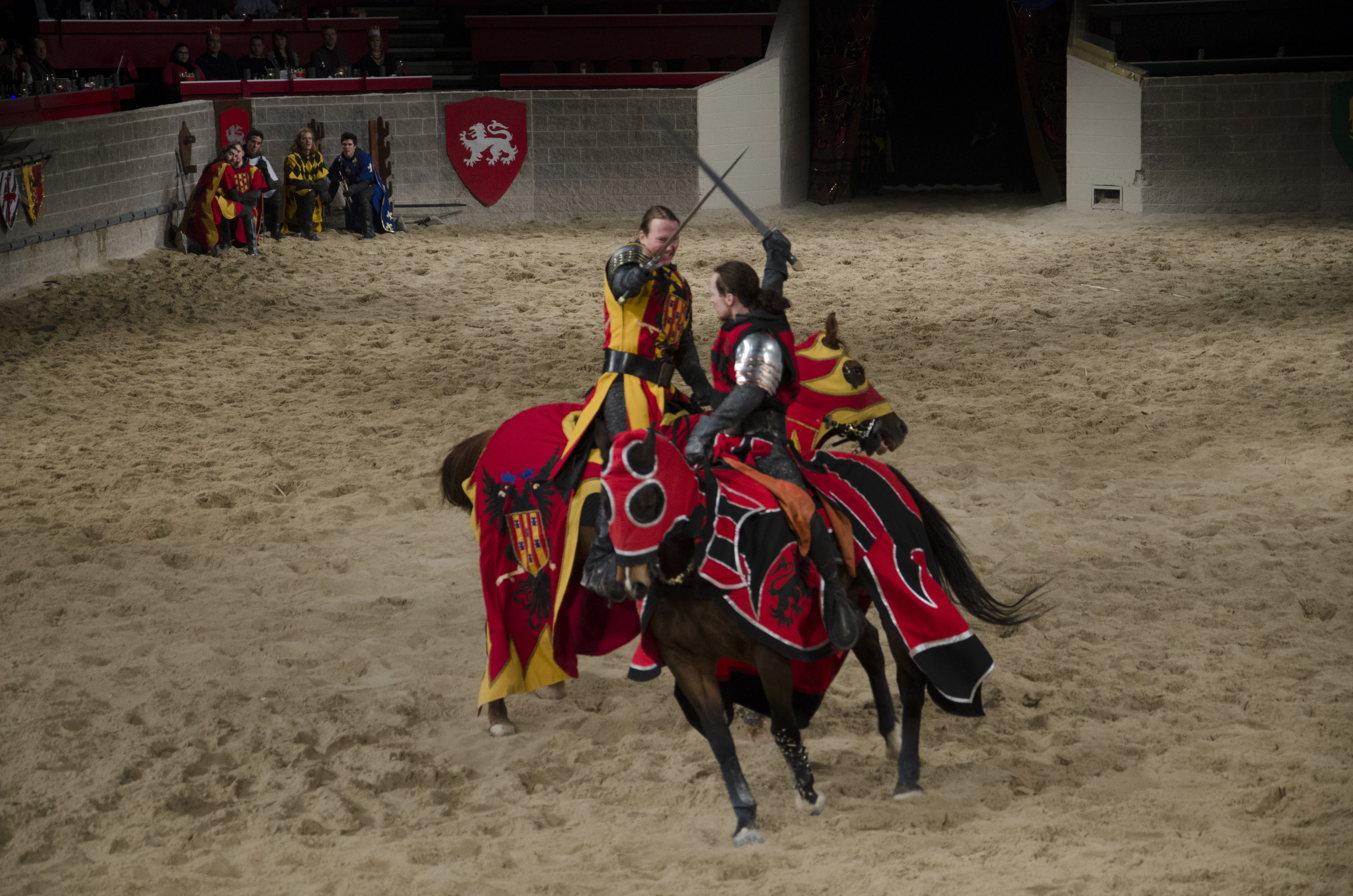
Medieval Times performers at the Toronto location in 2014

Medieval Times Dinner and Tournament is a Texas-based company that operates several Middle Ages-themed dinner theaters across North America, including nine locations in the United States and one in Canada as of 2022. The theaters host daily dinner shows that last for two hours and feature actors portraying medieval stock characters, such as knights and squires, participating in jousting and sword fighting, among other scripted games of skill. According to HuffPost, the role of the actors is tantamount to that of a stunt performer, and in many cases, the actors participate in two to three performances daily. At the Buena Park, California, location, some performers worked six-day weeks, participating in between 16 and 21 shows per week.

=== Unionization in Lyndhurst and Buena Park locations ===
In June 2022, an organization of employees at the Lyndhurst, New Jersey, location known as Medieval Times Performers United announced that they had collected enough signatures from the roughly 40 workers employed as actors, grooms, and stunt performers, to hold a vote on unionization, which they planned to hold on July 15. In a statement, the group stated that they would be organizing with the American Guild of Variety Artists (AGVA), a labor union affiliated with the AFL-CIO that represents workers in live performances, including the Rockettes and performers at Disneyland. According to the organizers, safety concerns and low pay were the two biggest driving factors in the push to unionize. In interviews with HuffPost, employees at the Lyndhurst location said that many new hires are paid around the New Jersey minimum wage of $13 per hour and have to work for several years before their pay is raised to around $20 per hour. Additionally, employees have stated that lower staffing levels caused by the COVID-19 pandemic have led to reduced security at performances. This union drive coincided with a number of high-profile labor organizing drives in the United States that involved companies such as Amazon and Starbucks, among others, and was the first at the Lyndhurst location since a 2006 failed effort by the Actors' Equity Association and the International Alliance of Theatrical Stage Employees.

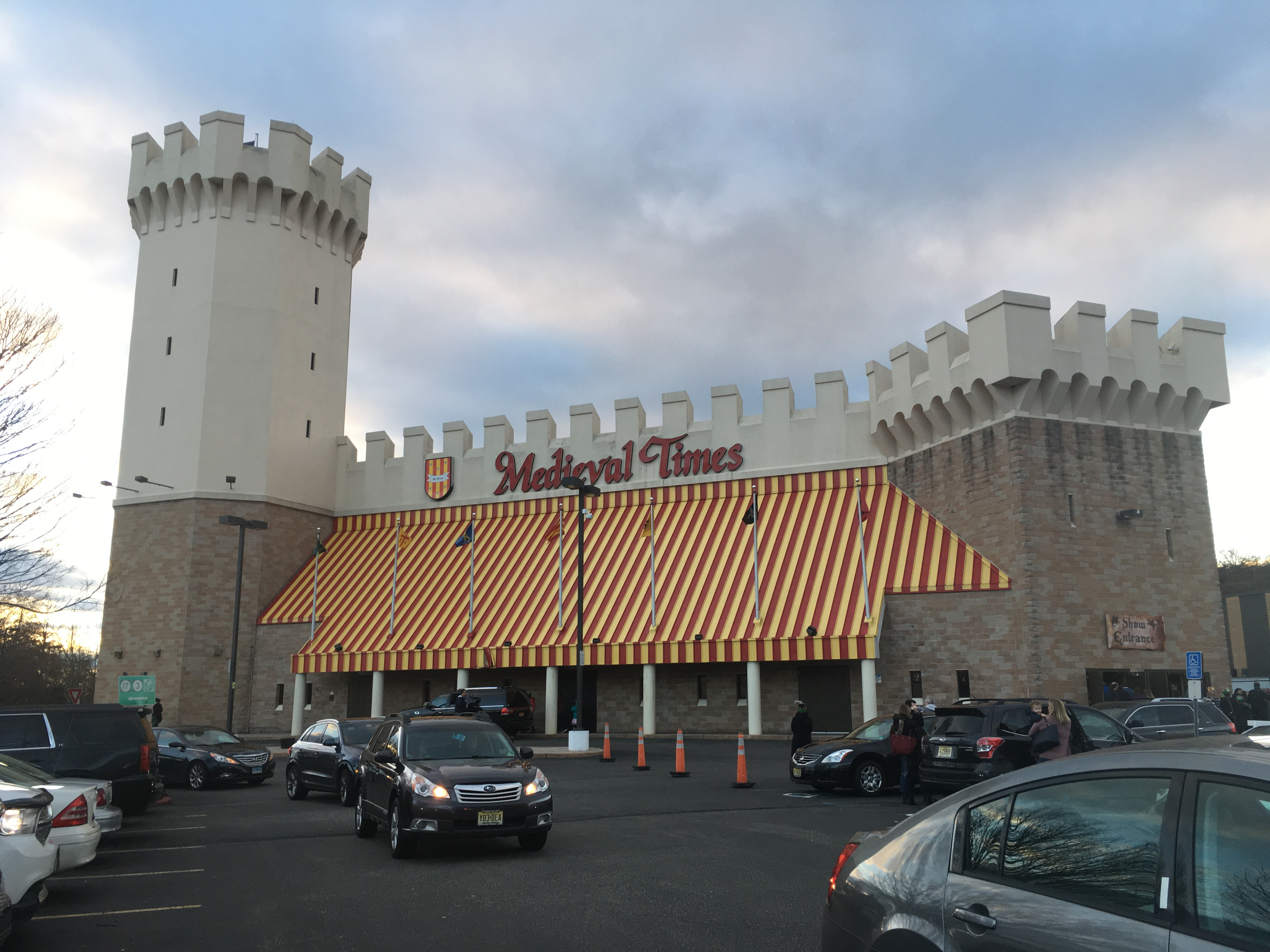
The Medieval Times location in Lyndhurst, New Jersey, 2018

In response to the unionizing efforts, the company employed an antiunion consultant and, according to several employees, held meetings with Lyndhurst employees where they expressed opposition to the unionization. Additionally, the employees leading the union drive said that Perico Montaner, the company's founder and chief executive officer, had met with them to privately discuss the issues they were raising. Additionally, Montaner announced a pay raise for Medieval Times performers at other locations, which he said was not due to the organizing efforts, but was instead the company's efforts to help employees adjust to increased inflation. On July 15, in an election overseen by the National Labor Relations Board (NLRB), the Lyndhurst workers voted 26 to 11 in favor of organizing, becoming the first unionized workforce at Medieval Times.

By the following week, HuffPost reported that workers at the Buena Park location had also gathered enough signatures to hold a union vote, with workers at this location also citing low pay and concerns over safety and staffing levels as their main reasons for organizing. In October, Medieval Times announced that they were filing a lawsuit against Medieval Times Performers United, alleging copyright infringement in the union's branding. Because of this, the union's TikTok account was banned. The union responded by filing an unfair labor practice charge with the NLRB, calling the company's actions "unlawful thuggery". The following year, a federal judge would rule in favor of the union, allowing them to use the "Medieval Times" name in their branding. That same month, the San Gabriel Valley Tribune published an article discussing a divide between employees at the Buena Park location over the issue of unionizing, with several employees who would be in the union's bargaining unit petitioning the AGVA to remove their request for a union election with the NLRB. Despite this, on November 10, the Buena Park workers voted 27 to 18 in favor of unionizing with the AGVA.

=== Negotiations ===
Beginning December 2022, the union and company entered into negotiations regarding wages. According to a union representative, while employees at non-union establishments had been guaranteed at least a 20 percent wage increase, the company proposed wage increases of between 2 and 8 percent for many of the union members, with no wage increases for trumpeters. According to the union, their counterproposal would have seen all union members' wages increased to the living wage for Orange County, California, equivalent to $23.66 per hour. At the time, the highest-paid non-manager performer at the location made $28.50 per hour and had been working at the location for 12 years. According to a company representative, the two sides engaged in two rounds of negotiations.

== Course of the strike ==
On Saturday, February 11, 2023, approximately half of the roughly 50 members of the Buena Park's bargaining unit performed a walkout before the second performance of the day and began picketing outside of the building, commencing a strike action. In addition to the strikers, several non-union employees in other departments picketed in solidarity with the performers, and an inflatable rat was set up in the parking lot. In total, roughly 150 employees at the location were in departments that were not unionized, and the company was able to put on the second show by involving employees from these other departments. Despite this, some patrons requested a refund. To help with strike funds, the union members set up a GoFundMe account, generating several thousand dollars in donations by February 13, and additionally, the strike was supported by the Orange County Labor Federation. Following the walkout, the union said that the company flew in performers from the nearest other location in Scottsdale, Arizona, to keep the performances going as scheduled.

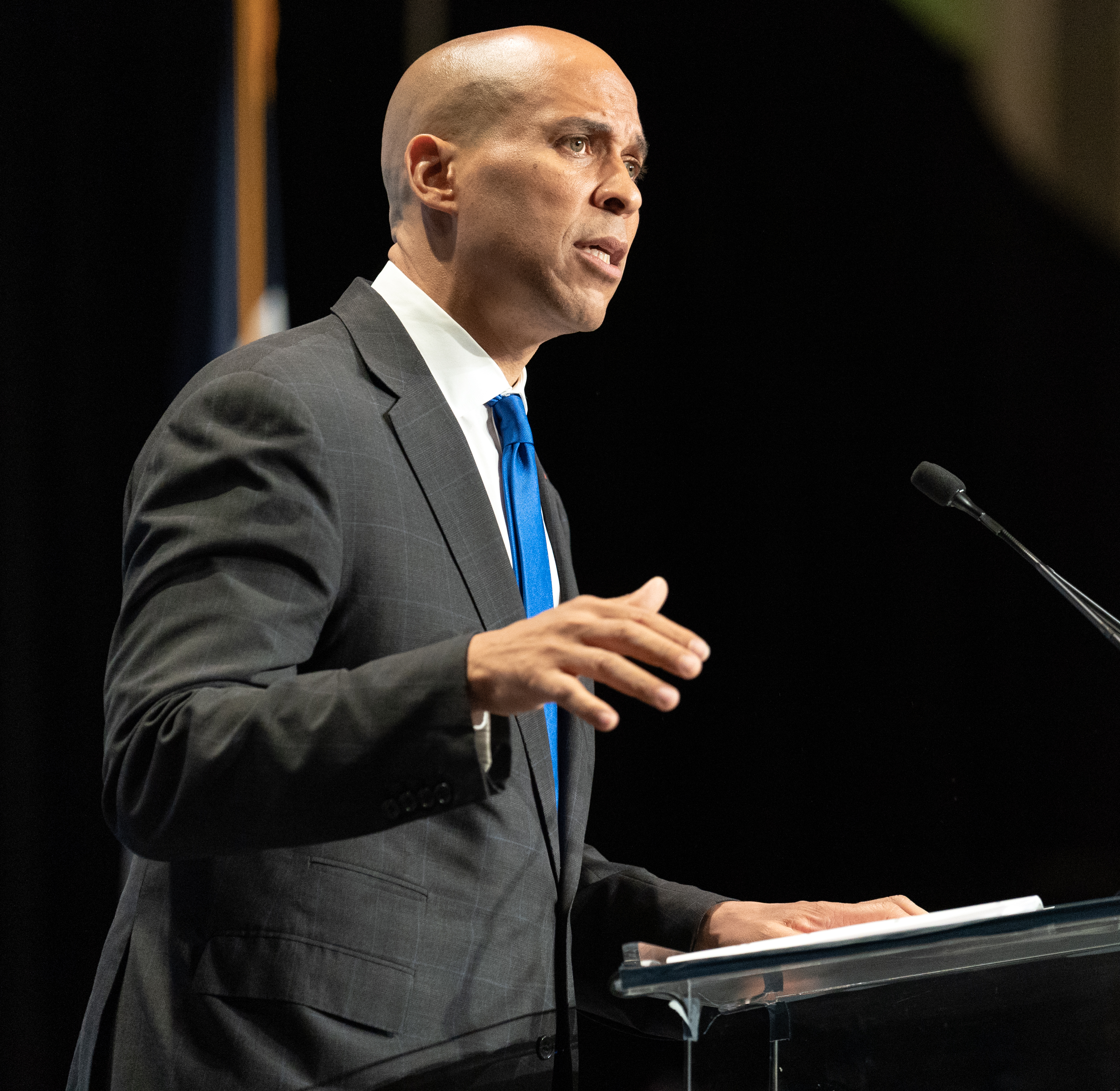
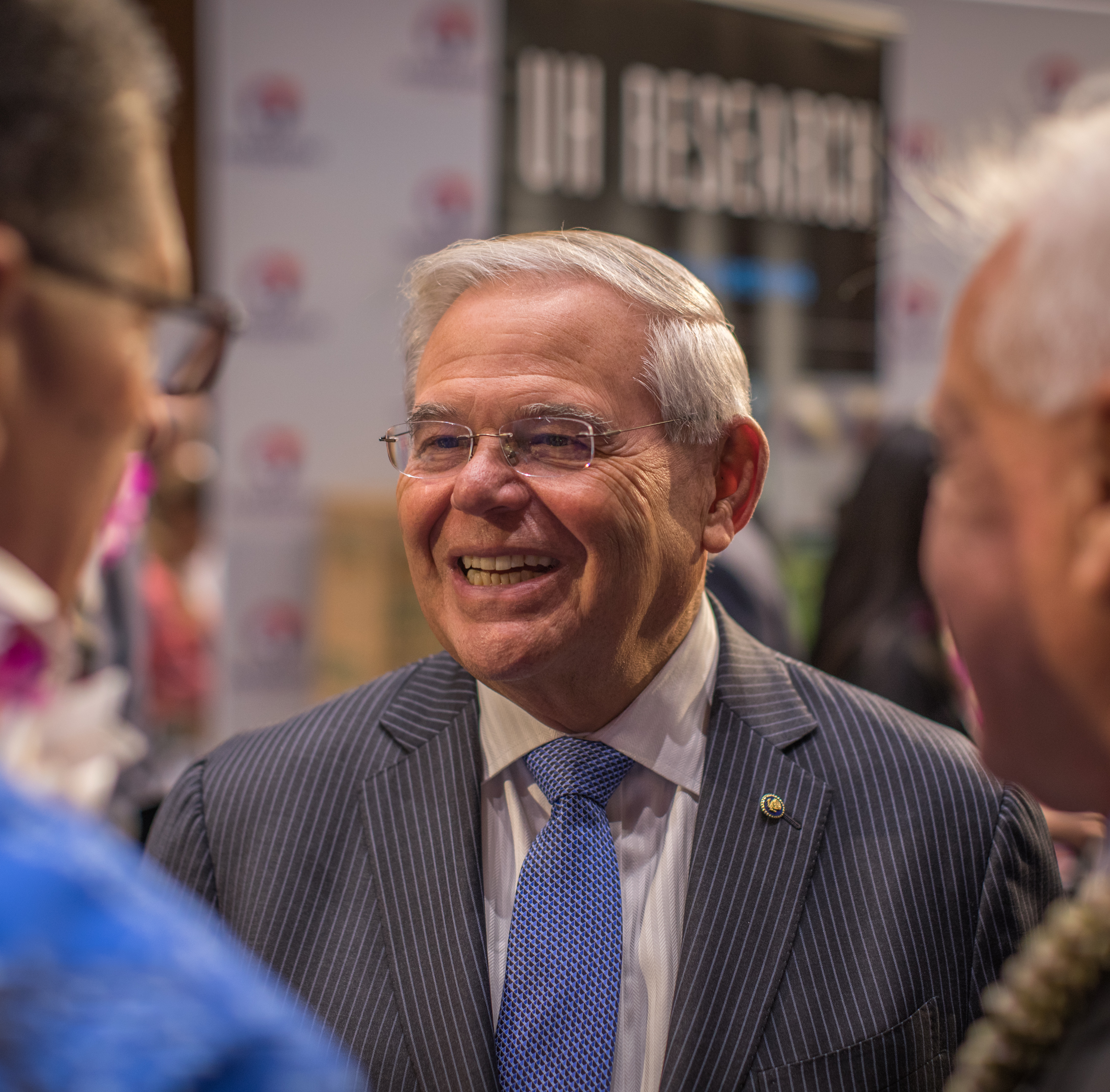
In May 2023, U.S. senators Cory Booker and Bob Menendez of New Jersey (both pictured 2019) wrote a letter to Medieval Times urging the company to negotiate in good faith with the unionized employees.

In May, United States senators Cory Booker and Bob Menendez of New Jersey wrote a letter to Medieval Times urging the company to negotiate in good faith with the two unionized locations. By the following month, with the strike entering its fourth month, many of the striking employees had sought out part-time jobs to supplement their incomes, and the union had reduced the number of weekly picketing days from six to five. Additionally, a significant number of the location's bargaining unit members had remained at work, opting to not participate in the strike. On June 4, the union held a 1980s-themed rally outside the location in an attempt to revive support for the workers. By September, picketing had been reduced to weekends-only, with about five to ten strikers at a time on the picket line. On September 13, union and company representatives held a virtual meeting to further discuss issues, but the strike continued through the end of the month, and on October 1, actors who were engaged in the 2023 SAG-AFTRA strike picketed alongside the performers at the Medieval Times location.

By November, the September 13 meeting was the last between the two sides, with the San Gabriel Valley Tribune reporting that the two sides had made no progress in negotiations since the strike had first started. By this time, as little as two strikers continued with picketing outside of the location. On November 17, the union agreed to what it called an "unconditional offer to return to work" without a labor contract, with their members to begin working again on November 22. While Medieval Times stated that they would not be rehiring three strikers for their conduct during the strike, the union stated that they would be pursuing legal action to reinstate them.

== Aftermath ==
On November 30, the editorial board of the San Gabriel Valley Tribune published an opinion piece stating that one employee at the Buena Park location had filed a petition with the NLRB, with the assistance of the National Right to Work Legal Defense Foundation (NRTW), requesting that the AGVA be removed as the collective bargaining agent for the Medieval Times workers. By the following year, HuffPost reported that the foundation was working at both unionized locations and that, in New Jersey, a majority of employees had signed a petition seeking to keep the location an "open shop", where union dues would not be required. Speaking of the backlash, NRTW president Mark Nix commented that "AGVA union officials treated each Medieval Times castle as their own personal fiefdom, but their actions led to an uprising of the rank-and-file they purported to represent". On March 13, 2024, the AGVA stated that they had decided to decline representing Medieval Times employees. In a statement released by union officials, the AGVA stated that, "Without the original support we started with, combined with circumstances beyond our control, it became impossible to continue" with the union drive.

== See also ==
- Strikes during the COVID-19 pandemic
- Timeline of strikes in 2023
