= Labor dispute =

Disagreement between an employer and employees regarding the terms of employment

A labor dispute is a disagreement between an employer and employees regarding the terms of employment. This could include disputes regarding conditions of employment, fringe benefits, hours of work, tenure, and wages to be negotiated during collective bargaining, imposed through interest arbitration, or the implementation of already agreed upon terms. It could further concern the association or representation of those who negotiate or seek to negotiate the terms or conditions of employment.

== Prevention ==
Preventing labor disputes involves coordinating actions at multiple levels, including:

Publicity

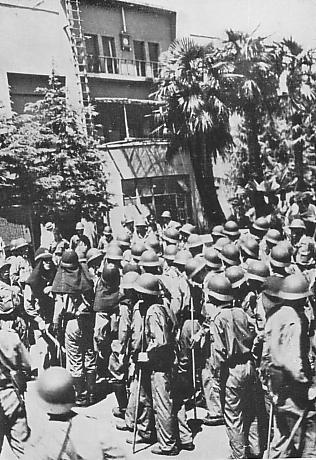
Toho labor disputes

Policies and regulations are promoted through multiple channels to inform employers of legal requirements. Workers' rights activists manage the social and cultural environment.

Collective bargaining

In countries such as the US, the workforce can form unions, strike and collectively bargain with employers. The workers have the right to speak up about employment conditions.

== Resolution ==
Fact finding

Some jurisdictions permit fact finding as a formalized process and an extension of collective bargaining, as a way to resolve labor disputes. A fact finder makes findings and recommendations, but is not empowered to impose a contract.

Mediation

Mediation is one technique for resolving labor disputes. In mediation, the parties meet and seek to resolve their differences. A neutral party attempts to help the disputants to find a mutually acceptable solution.

Arbitration

Arbitration vests the responsibility of the outcome in the person chosen to be the arbitrator. Each side presents their case, but the resolution does not require agreement from either party.

In some jurisdictions, interest arbitration is available for selected employers and bargaining units (e.g. Police, Fire, Public Safety). Likewise, under the terms of the United States Railway Labor Act, there can be resort to such a panel. Interest arbitration is defined as:

Arbitration, interest. An impasse resolution procedure in which one or more neutrals renders a binding decision to resolve a dispute over new contract terms, interest arbitration procedures may differ in terms of the number of arbitrators. {single or panel). The rules governing the nature of the decision, and the nature of the proceedings (voluntary or compulsory, by law or contract). A number of public jurisdictions have enacted laws mandating arbitration of new contract term disputes, as an alternative to the right to strike, most notably of disputes involving police, firefighters, and guard employees. Connecticut, Iowa, Rhode Island, and Wisconsin, among others, have extended arbitration to include other than essential employees such as teachers. Occasionally called nonjusticiable arbitration.

== Notification ==
In the United States, federal law requires a government contractor with knowledge of an actual or potential labor dispute to notify the government's Contracting Officer of the dispute.

== See also ==
- Boycott
- Collective bargaining
- Grievance
- National Academy of Arbitrators
- National Labor Relations Board
- Strike
- Unfair labor practice
