= 2023 British Columbia port strike =

The 2023 British Columbia port strike was a 13-day strike from 1 July to 13 July, with over 7,400 striking workers freezing up to $10 billion of trade in Vancouver, British Columbia–Canada's busiest port. On 4 August, a deal drafted by a federal mediator between the International Longshore and Warehouse Union (ILWU) and the British Columbia Maritime Employers Association (BCMEA) was accepted. The 13-day strike began on 1 July and prevented the movement of cargo at thirty 30 port terminals and other sites in the province with over 7,400 workers on strike over wages, pensions, "contracting and automation". The trade disruption amounted to approximately $500 million daily, according to Canadian Manufacturers & Exporters (CME).

Over 40% of cargo shipped to Canada is handled at the Vancouver port system. By mid-July after 13 days of the strike, there were approximately 63,000 shipping containers that needed to be unloaded. A major business and industry group, which included the Greater Vancouver Board of Trade (GVBoT), Canadian Federation of Independent Business, and the BC Chamber of Commerce, calculated the cost of the disruption at an estimated $9 billion worth of trade, according to CityTV.

The strike was the result of a vote held on 12 June, in which 98% of the International Longshore and Warehouse Union (ILWU) membership—representing 7,000 terminal cargo workers members—voted in favour of the strike. The ILWU began bargaining with British Columbia Maritime Employers Association (BCMEA) in February with their contract ending in March.

Port operations were able to resume on 13 July after the BCMEA announced a tentative agreement with the ILWU had been reached. Seamus O'Regan said, "the strike is over". Picket lines with workers on strike appeared again briefly on 18 July when ILWU leadership voted against the Canada Industrial Relations Board's (CIRB) terms. The CIRB ruled the renewed strike as unlawful because the ILWU had not provided a 72-hour warning.

On 19 July, Prime Minister Justin Trudeau convened an incident response group with Cabinet ministers and senior officials. The incident response team was created on 28 August 2018 by Trudeau and described by the government as "a dedicated, emergency committee that will convene in the event of a national crisis or during incidents elsewhere that have major implications for Canada". It is only convened when there is a national crisis; for example, the 2018 assassination of Jamal Khashoggi, the Ukraine International Airlines Flight 752, the 2020 Canadian pipeline and railway protests, the COVID-19 pandemic, the Freedom Convoy movement and the major blockades associated with the convoy, the Russian invasion of Ukraine, and the Wagner Group rebellion.

The ILWU issued a new notice to strike to begin on 22 July but then quickly rescinded the notice after the incident response team had been convened.

On August 4, with help from the Canada Industrial Relations Board, over 74% of the ILWU members voted to accept the BCMEA's offer which included increased wages and training.

== See also ==
- International Longshore and Warehouse Union
- Timeline of strikes in 2023
