= 2023 Rutgers University strike =

Labor strike at Rutgers University, New Jersey

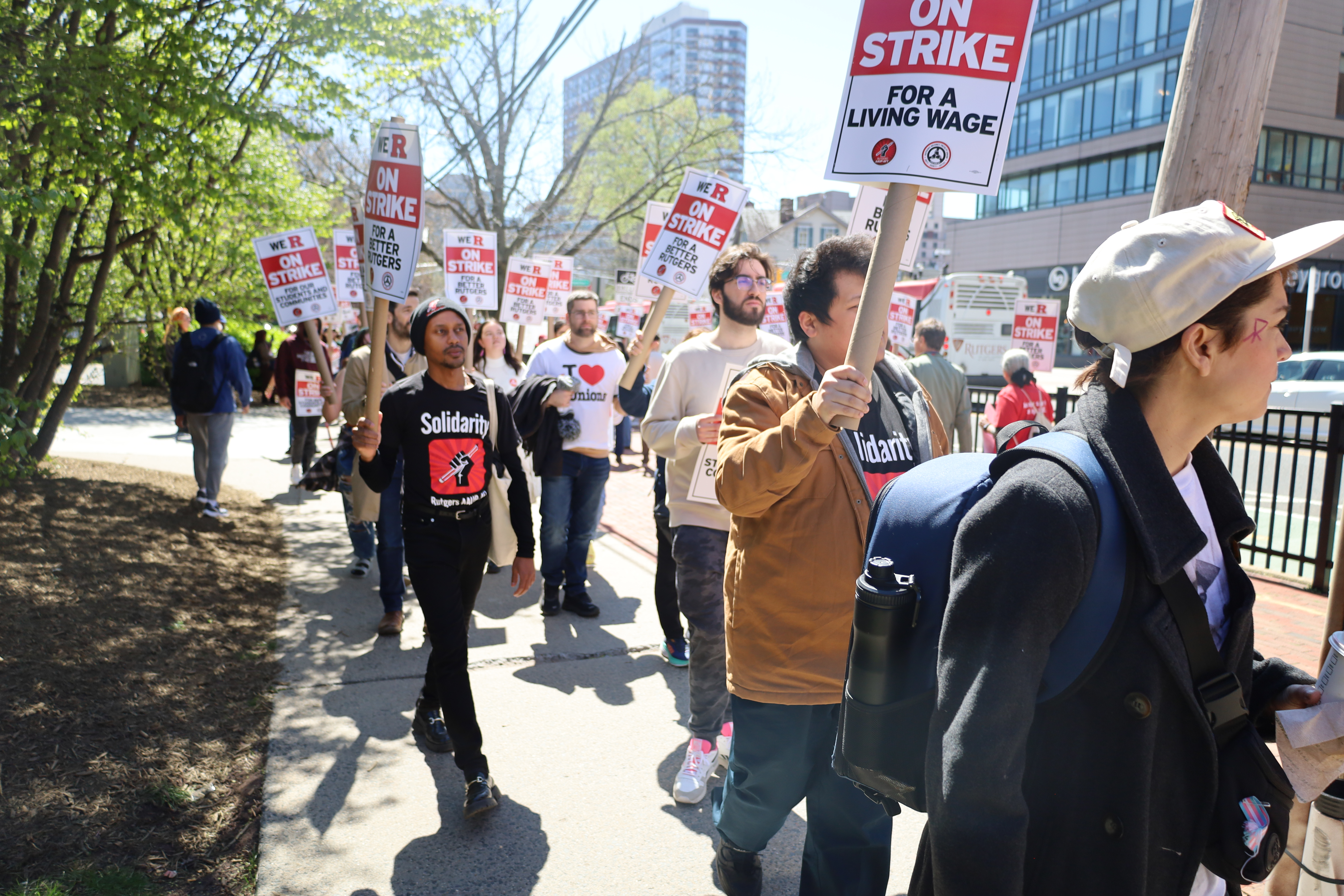
- Academic workers and students picketing outside The Yard, College Avenue Campus
- Date: April 10, 2023 – April 15, 2023 (5 days)
- Location: New Jersey, United States
- Goals: Ratification of a labor contract; Equal pay for equal work; Increased salaries and job security; Control over scheduling; Affordable housing; Longer-term contracts
- Methods: Strike action; Work stoppage; Picketing
- Result: Strike suspended: Tentative agreement for across-the-board salary increases reached; Sporadic strikes continue afterward by instructor unions

Parties
| Rutgers AAUP-AFT; PTLFC-AAUP-AFT; AAUP-BHSNJ | Rutgers University |

Lead figures
| Rebecca Givan (AAUP-AFT); Jim Brown (AAUP-AFT); Amy Higer (PTLFC); Catherine Monteleone (BHSNJ) | Jonathan Holloway (President) |

The 2023 Rutgers University strike was a labor strike involving faculty and graduate student workers at Rutgers University in New Jersey, United States. Academic workers at all four campuses—New Brunswick, Newark, Camden, and Rutgers Health—participated in the bargaining action, affecting over 9,000 staff members and 67,000 students at the university. The strike began on April 10, 2023 following several months of failed negotiations between labor unions and Rutgers administration and was suspended on April 15, 2023.

On June 30, 2022, the labor contract between Rutgers and its labor unions expired after an agreement on new contract couldn't be reached. Union members continued to work without a contract while negotiations continued, with union leaders demanding increased salaries, more job security, and equal pay for equal work. Management bargainers provided counter-offers of gradual raises at percentages lower than those requested by Rutgers AAUP-AFT and rejected many provisions regarding working conditions. A vote for strike authorization passed on March 10, 2023, allowing union leaders to call a strike if a contract could not be reached, while Rutgers administration, led by university president Jonathan Holloway, maintained that striking was illegal.

The strike ended after a tentative framework was reached on April 15, though the unions asserted to resume work stoppage if their gains were not secured. An agreement was formally reached on May 8, ending the strike. It was the first strike by academics in the school's history, and one of the largest strikes in American educational history. A strike by 2,800 non-teaching faculty members in January 1987 had ended after an agreement was made with the administration after nine days. New Jersey governor Phil Murphy's extensive involvement in negotiations to end the strike was considered unprecedented, and received praise from both union officials and Holloway.

== Background ==
During the COVID-19 pandemic in June 2020, Rutgers declared a fiscal emergency and laid off more than 1,000 staff members, including adjunct professors. The layoffs included five percent of the university's total union membership. The layoffs created concerns of job security, and 20 labor unions at the university formed a coalition called the Coalition of Rutgers Unions to defend jobs that were threatened by layoffs. Additionally, due to delays caused by the pandemic, many graduate students lost funding for their research and felt that Rutgers did not offer adequate compensation. In April 2021, the Coalition of Rutgers Unions reached a deal to prevent further layoffs until January 2022, but concern for job security and fair wages remained.

The labor contract between Rutgers and the 20 unions expired on June 30, 2022, and union members continued work without a contract. In August 2022, an investigation by The Bergen Record revealed that the Rutgers athletics department had spent $450,000 on DoorDash orders from football players between May 2021 and June 2022, causing many students to question how Rutgers was spending their budget. Rebecca Givan, president of the American Association of University Professors – American Federation of Teachers (AAUP-AFT) union, criticized the "upside-down priorities" of Rutgers administration, saying:

Everybody else at Rutgers has to follow strict rules and jump through a hundred hoops around expenses like these, but apparently the rules don't apply to the athletics program or the top administrators who oversee it. And at the same time, the administration tells us they don't have the money for urgent needs, like a central program to guarantee funding extensions for graduate students whose work was disrupted by the pandemic.

On December 6, 2022, hundreds of students and faculty gathered at Voorhees Mall on New Brunswick's College Avenue Campus to protest the lack of bargaining progress. Over 100 bargaining meetings were ultimately held with no agreement. On February 28, 2023, after eight months of failed negotiations, three unions within the Coalition of Rutgers Unions (AAUP-AFT, PTLFC-AAUP-AFT, and AAUP-BHSNJ) collectively opened a vote for strike authorization. The vote ended on March 10. About 80 percent of union members participated in the vote and 94 percent of votes were in favor of strike authorization.

Throughout March and April, university president Jonathan Holloway gave periodic updates on labor negotiations to students and faculty through email blasts. In several emails, Holloway warned that strikes by public employees were "unlawful in New Jersey". The assertion was widely condemned by academics across the country. An open letter calling him to rescind his statement was signed by over 40 scholars, including Ibram X. Kendi, Elizabeth Hinton, and Judith Butler.

=== Salaries and employee benefits ===
Prior to the strike, graduate students received an annual salary of about $30,000, which was substantially less than their full-time peers when proportionally adjusted. Union leaders requested for the minimum salary to be increased to $37,000. This salary would still fall below the living wage for Middlesex County, New Jersey, which was at least $41,038.40 for 2022. Union leaders found the offer provided by Rutgers as unacceptable, which would have a wage increase only occur in the third and fourth years of their contract. The unions also sought raises for full-time faculty members, post-doctoral associates, teaching assistants, and adjunct faculty, of which the administration provided vague offers. Other demands raised by the unions included the deletion of any language from contracts allowing for raises to be cancelled as a result of "fiscal emergencies," extended parental leave, rent freezes on campus student housing, and loan forgiveness for some students.

== Course of the strike ==
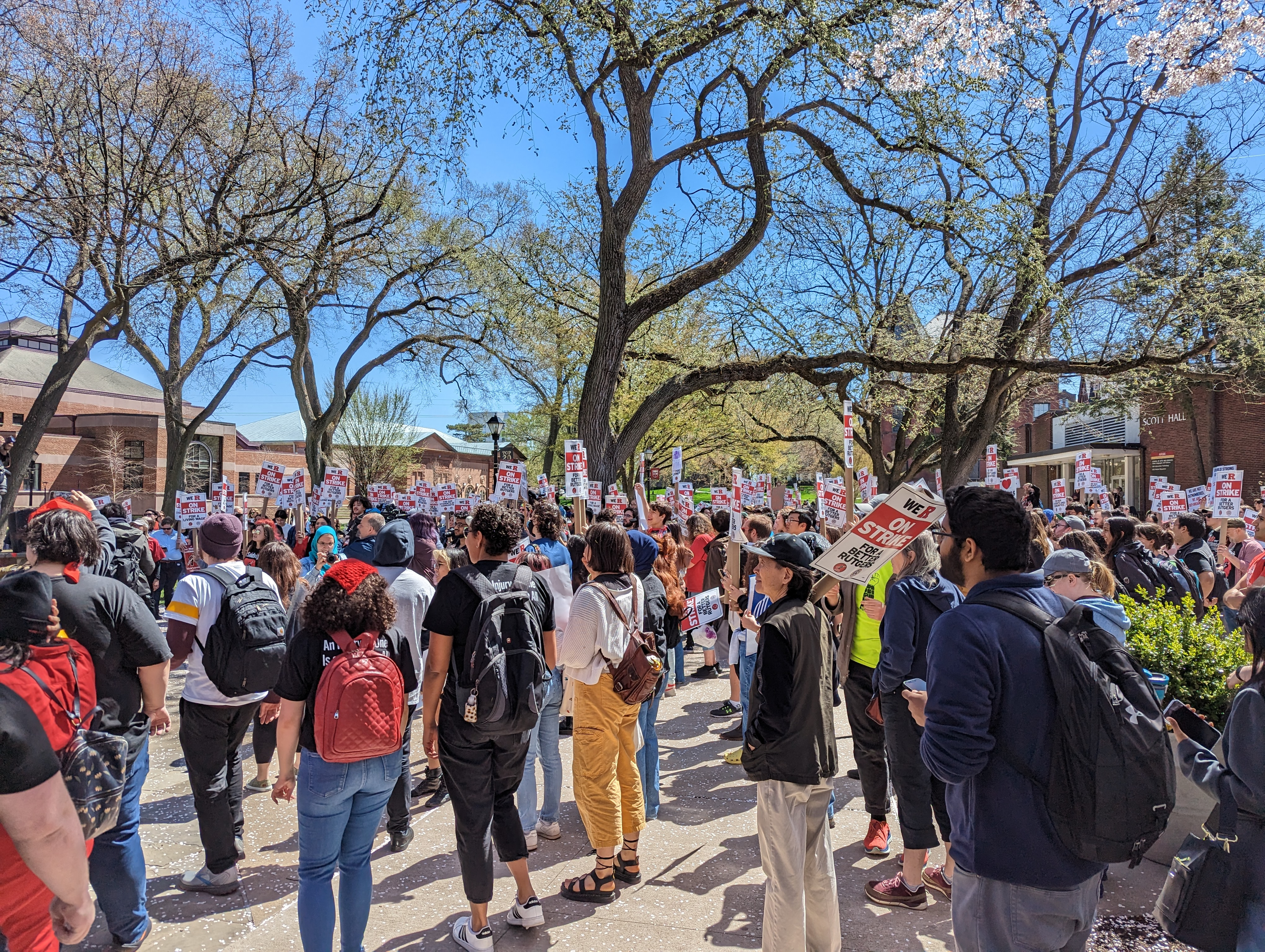
Picketers gather on Voorhees Mall, College Avenue Campus, during the first day of the strike

The strike was first announced during a virtual "town hall meeting" held over Zoom on the evening of Sunday, April 9, 2023. Shortly after the strike was announced, Jonathan Holloway wrote in an email to the Rutgers community: "To say that this is deeply disappointing would be an understatement, especially given that just two days ago, both sides agreed in good faith to the appointment of a mediator to help us reach agreements." Later that night, Governor Phil Murphy requested for union leaders and university administrators to meet at his office in Trenton to have a "productive dialogue".

The strike began on April 10 at 9 a.m. At the time of the strike's start, 284 days had passed since the last union contract with Rutgers expired. Three unions participated in the strike: the Rutgers AAUP-AFT (American Association of University Professors – American Federation of Teachers), the PTLFC-AAUP-AFT (Rutgers Adjunct Faculty Union), and the Biomedical and Health Sciences of New Jersey (AAUP-BHSNJ). The unions stated that "the administration doesn't understand that we are determined to fight together for equal pay for equal work, a living wage for all, real job security, race and gender equity, and a fair salary increase. We have no other choice than to go on strike to build a university that truly values its workers and its students."

During the negotiations in Trenton, Murphy urged Holloway not to take legal action against the strikers until further developments could be made, but Holloway warned that he would take legal action if no movement towards an agreement could be made. Murphy's suggestion to use state funding to help end the strike ignited controversy and accusations of setting "a dangerous precedent" among lawmakers.

On April 13, an agreement was made for non-tenured professors to have "presumptive renewal," no longer requiring them to re-apply for their jobs every year. The strike was suspended on the morning of April 15 after Murphy announced a "framework agreement" had been reached. On May 1, the tentative contract was agreed to by union leaders. On May 8, the contract was voted on by all union faculty members, with 93 percent of votes in favor of ratification.

=== Potential URA-AFT strike ===
On April 11, a fourth union, the URA-AFT (Union of Rutgers Administrators-American Federation of Teachers), representing 2,500 workers in the facilities, residential life, and dining services, entered consideration to join the strike. The URA-AFT launched a strike pledge on April 17 to determine if their members would start the process of going on strike with the pledge expected to end by April 24. The president of URA-AFT, Christine O'Connell, has stated their labor contract negotiations with Rutgers administration are wholly separate from the other three unions, and has faced repeated rejections and delays with the administration over contract proposals.

== Impact ==
Avatar of Governor Phil Murphy

Governor Phil Murphy
(@GovMurphy)
tweeted:

After five days of intensive dialogue and negotiations in my office, I am pleased to share that @RutgersU and union bargaining committees have come to an agreement. Looking forward to students across Rutgers campuses resuming their world-class educations on Monday.

April 15, 2023

The agreement reached on April 15 included across-the-board salary increases retroactive to all contracts signed after July 1, 2022. The salary of full-time faculty and counselors increased by at least 14 percent by July 1, 2025, while a 43.8 percent increase was negotiated for part-time lecturers over four years. Over the same period, minimum salary of postdoctoral fellows and associates were increased by 27.9 percent. Graduate students were guaranteed health-care coverage, free tuition and fees, and a ten-month salary increase to $40,000. Details on how the budget would be paid and further specifics were to be provided in the future.

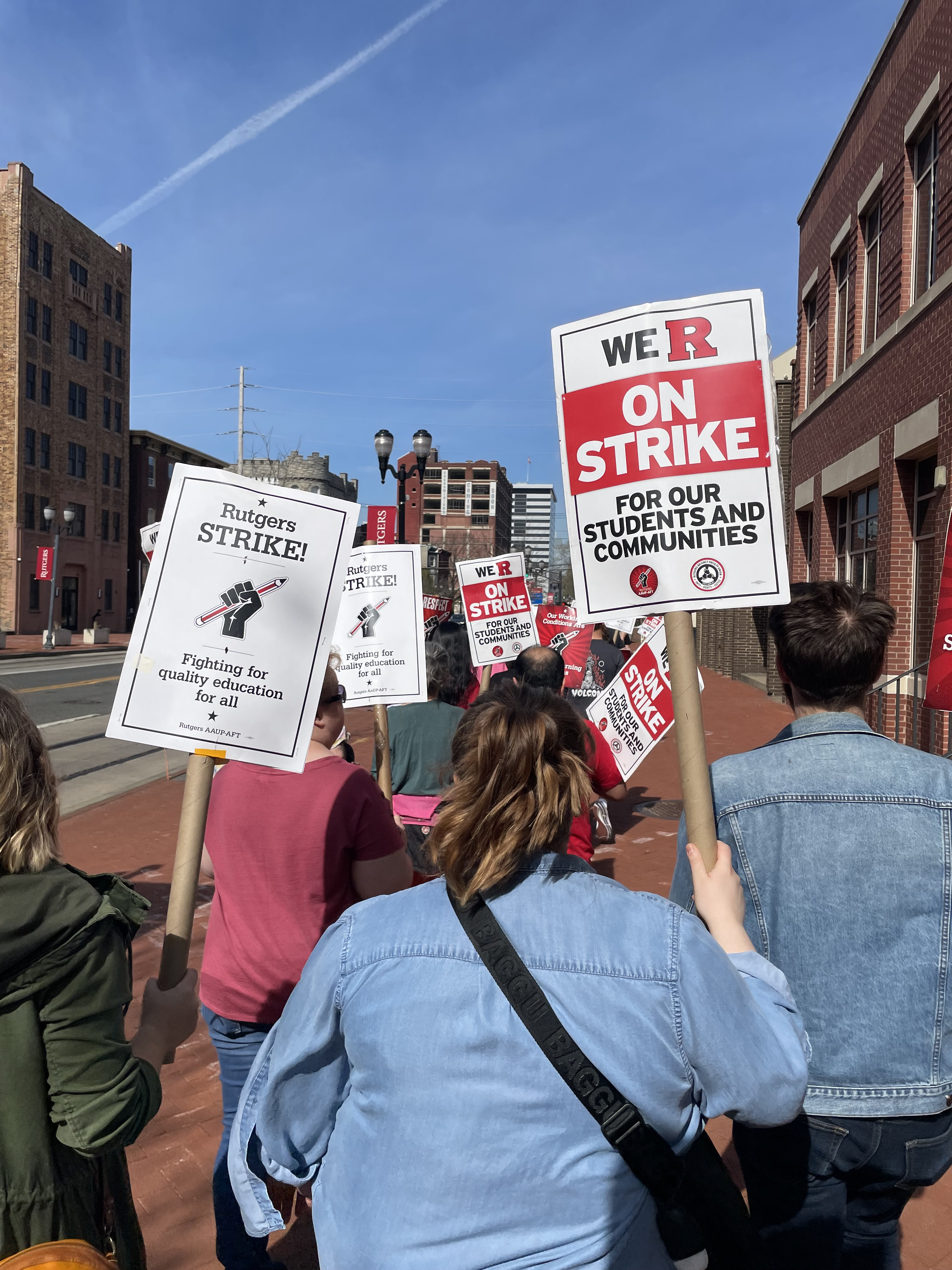
Academic workers and students picket at Rutgers-Camden Campus

The negotiations are expected to continue until a final vote could be held on the new contract, with union leaders cautioning that there remained "open issues that need to be resolved". Governor Murphy's intervention in the strike was seen as critical to the reaching of the agreement, with President Holloway describing him as "to whom we all are deeply indebted." Murphy's intervention was contrasted to other university strikes, such as the 2022 University of California strike, being unaffected by gubernatorial action. The decision to suspend the strike was criticized by some dissenting workers, with World Socialist Web Site accusing union leaders as having signed a "monumental betrayal." Some unions continued to picket after the strike's conclusion to ensure their demands were met.

On September 22, 2023, the Rutgers Senate passed a motion of no confidence in Holloway's leadership, in part because of his handling of the strike. On September 17, 2024, Holloway announced that he would resign as university president at the end of the 2024-25 academic year.

== Reactions ==
The strike was met with expressions of solidarity from both the labor movement and commentators nationwide, many of whom criticized the actions of university president Holloway. The solidarity shown between tenured professors and lower-paid academic workers was seen as "unusual and admirable" by educational administrator Julie E. Wollman. The Lever noted the discrepancy between the $246 million from endowments the university spent on hedge fund investments over the past two years, with the outlet noting that the performance of such investments trailed other funds. Salon described the strike action as an indication that the national labor movement is "growing increasingly militant and more willing to strike to upend the status quo," and lauded it as "part of a massive national movement looking to counter the corporate takeover of higher education." NPR opined the action as demonstrating that "Gen Z is the most pro union generation alive." The Philadelphia Inquirer described the strike as signifying the impact of the COVID pandemic on labor relations and demands for a living wage.

The state AFL-CIO and the educator's labor union New Jersey Education Association (NJEA) both voiced their support for the strike action. Ras Baraka, the mayor of Newark, issued a statement in support of the strike, stating "I stand with the faculty unions. Do better, Rutgers." The strikers were joined in person by national AAUP president Irene Mulvey, U.S. representative Frank Pallone, whose congressional district includes New Brunswick, and Craig Coughlin, the speaker of the New Jersey General Assembly. U.S. Senator Bernie Sanders tweeted in support of the academic workers.

Conservative commentators reacted to the strike with mixed reactions. Television host and congressional candidate Bill Spadea wrote in support of the strikers, while 2021 gubernatorial candidate Jack Ciattarelli voiced concern for graduating seniors. The editorial board of The Wall Street Journal criticized Murphy's actions as having put the demands of the strikers over the university's students by disrupting classes and delaying graduations. On March 15, 2024, the seven participating unions were sued by Rutgers Republicans chair Jeremy Li, who alleged the strike damaged students' educations. The lawsuit was dismissed with prejudice on July 1, 2026.

== See also ==
- 2023 Temple University strike
