= Grievance (labour) =

Formal complaint

A grievance is a formal complaint that is raised by an employee towards an employer within the workplace. There are many reasons as to why a grievance can be raised, and also many ways to go about dealing with such a scenario. Reasons for filing a grievance in the workplace can be as a result of, but not limited to, a breach of the terms and conditions of an employment contract, raises and promotions, or lack thereof, as well as harassment and employment discrimination.

According to Sean C. Doyle, in his work titled, The Grievance Procedure: The Heart of the Collective Agreement, the grievance process takes on certain secondary roles in countries such as Canada, United States and the United Kingdom that can include, but are not limited to, "a mechanism for the extension of the relationship between the parties, a union tactic to pressure management for strategic purposes, a diagnostic device to uncover underlying problems in the workplace, a mechanism for individual employees or union officials to challenge management over a range of working conditions, or even a forum for the communication of information".

A grievance between an employee and employer can be dealt with either informally or formally, and sometimes both approaches are taken in search of a resolution. In the informal approach, an employee can informally bring forth a concern promptly to their employer. Here a discussion or similar between the two parties can result in a mutually agreed upon resolution. In the case that this step fails or is skipped altogether, a grievance can be raised formally, where formal meetings and options for appeals become available.

Workplaces that have trade union representation often file a grievance with an employer on behalf of an individual employees request. According to the Union of Northern Workers, "Grievances are filed by the union on behalf of its members. Most of the grievances filed by unions are filed on behalf of individual employees (individual grievances) or on behalf of a group of employees (group grievances). A third type of grievance is the policy grievance which deals with issues that affect all employees".

== Relationship to Labour Law ==
In the majority of cases, a grievance in a workplace is filed due to a breach of labour law. Though labour law can be different from country to country, there is a general understanding of this particular laws meaning and relationship to employees and employers. According to Peter Ackers and Adrian Wilkinson in their work titled Understanding Work and Employment: Industrial Relations in Transition, labour law involved items can include, "the contract of employment, regulatory legislation (such as health and safety measures), the conduct of industrial disputes, and questions of trade union government". Going further, these authors also note the concern of labour law with three relationships in particular, that include, "the relationship between the employer and the worker (a relationship rooted in contract - the contract of employment); the relationship between the employer and the trade union (a relationship rooted in tort - interference with trade, business or employment by unlawful means); and the relationship between the trade union and the worker (a relationship rooted in contract - the contract of membership)".

Though all three relationships are very different, they are all highly connected, especially in a situation where a grievance is filed by an employee or a union.

== Benefits of a Grievance ==
Above all else, a grievance is a procedure that allows for peace of mind, since knowing that there is a procedure in place to challenge questionable decisions that are made by others in the workplace is available. A grievance allows for an opportunity at conflict management with ideals such as fairness and equity at its forefront. Employees are able to have their say at all levels of management, with the opportunity to escalate to an independent arbitrator if necessary.

While there are benefits for employees, management benefits from the presence of a grievance process as well. As Sean C. Doyle states in his work titled, The Grievance Procedure: The Heart of the Collective Agreement, this is due to the fact that, "the process represents an excellent means for achieving consistency in policy formulation and application and can ensure compliance with corporate policy by middle management and supervisors since their decisions are subject to the grievance procedure and will be reviewed by their superiors". To be more specific, the grievance process often encourages the workplace contract to be quite specific, therefore it will encompass several events that can occur on a day-to-day basis. This creates clear expectations on both the part of an employee and employer, with the hope of a quick, but fair resolution.

As for the union, a grievance procedure can act as a way to nurture trust and loyalty between employee and the union. Since a grievance is usually a process that is supported by both employee and employer, there is always an understanding that this will be the route taken for conflict resolution within the workplace. When action must be taken, the union can play a significant role in the grievance process, and for this reason, it is important that they achieve a fair settlement for their clients, who are the employees, in order to gain further support and in some cases, re-election for company union representation.

== Disadvantages of a Grievance ==
Though the grievance process does provide for a structured and often fair procedure to dealing with conflicts within the workplace, there are also certain disadvantages present. In some cases, employees and employers alike can see the inclusion of a third-party arbitrator as a way in which they lose specific rights or control over the situation. Another more obvious disadvantage is the use of time and money, which are both valuable resources to an organization. Often, a grievance does take a substantial amount of time to be completed, and therefore there is plenty of time used, while costs incurred during the investigation, and in particular through the inclusion of a third-party arbitrator can quickly add up. Another common disadvantage amongst employee and employer has to do with the notion of expectation. For instance, one party may prefer a quick resolution, while another may prefer to take their time and conduct a thorough investigation.

Ultimately a grievance process takes the attention of both the employee and employer away from their main roles in a workplace and shifts them elsewhere, while tensions between both parties can also form, resulting in future toxic environments or feelings.

== International Approaches ==
=== Grievance Process in Canada and the United States ===
Grievance procedures can differ slightly from province to province, or state to state, though the process itself is quite similar whether it occurs in Canada or the United States.

Most grievance cases feature a three to four step process. In a workplace that features a union structure, grievances begin with an employee bringing forth a particular issue or issues to their direct management source (usually in writing) within a specified period following the particular infraction. The issue is then in the hands of management who now has a specific period to respond personally or escalate the issue further to a higher authority. At this point, and sometimes even prior, a union representative enters the situation (if such structure exists) on behalf of the employee. If the situation cannot be resolved in an informal manner, or the preliminary stages of a formal grievance, the case is usually brought to an independent arbitrator. Since this is in many cases a last step in the process, the decision of an arbitrator is usually seen as final. A step that must be mutually agreed upon and one that is not always usual in the process is presenting the grievance to a mediator, who can assist the two or more sides solve their disagreement without having to go to arbitration. Mediation tends to cost both sides far less in terms of finances and time as opposed to the arbitration process.

An important piece of the grievance process in Canada and the United States revolves around timelines that must be met to ensure that a grievance remains active. Time limits are not always set, but they are in most cases, and this is why this is an important factor to highlight. In Canada for instance, a grievance must be filed within twenty five days of the occurrence being reported to a secondary party. This time limit excludes weekends and holidays that would usually be paid. An employer is required to respond to a grievance within ten days of its initial receipt. In many cases, if these set time limits are not adhered to, a grievance can be nullified. It is acceptable for an employee and employer to mutually agree upon extending certain deadlines past the above noted days allowable, though it is recommended to do so in writing.

=== Grievance Process in the United Kingdom ===
The process of a grievance in the United Kingdom is not significantly different from the process used in Canada and the United States, however, the process will be outlined below.

A grievance filed by an employer or employee should be submitted in writing. The next step involves a meeting between employee and employer. It is a statutory right for an employee to be able to bring a companion, but not just anyone, there are stipulations here; the companion must be a member of the union representing the employee, co-worker or similar. If an employer or employee is unsatisfied following the meeting, there will be an opportunity to appeal the decision. In some cases, an appeal is held in-house by an impartial individual who may be employed by the same organization but had no previous involvement or bias in the case.

== Major Grievance Cases in Canada ==
=== Pate Estate v. Harvey (Township) ===
If not done correctly, workplace dismissal and the way in which it is handled can result in a grievance being filed. This specific case highlights a case of dismissal gone wrong. In 2009, the Ontario Superior Court of Justice rewarded a wrongfully dismissed employee named John Gordon Pate $550,000 in damages for his March 1999 dismissal.

→DHARVI BIRLA Mr. Pate was Chief Building Official of the Corporation of the Township of Galway-Cavendish from 1989 until December 31, 1998. The Township of Galway-Cavendish had dismissed Mr. Pate based on an issue with his handling of building permit fees. The Township went one step further and asked the OPP to look into the matter and potentially lay criminal charges. This request by the township to the provincial police was well-received and led to a four-day long criminal trial. This trial ended in the dismissal of the former employees original charges.

Following this particular ordeal, Mr. Pate in turn sued the Township for wrongful dismissal as well as malicious prosecution. He won on both charges. In November 2013, the Ontario Court of Appeal lowered the amount of damages awarded to Mr. Pate to $450,000.

=== Wilson v. Solis Mexican Foods Inc. ===
This specific case involves an employee named Patricia Wilson and her employer Solis Mexican Foods. According to the specific case subsection on the Cassels Brock Lawyers website, "This was the first Ontario court decision to award damages under the Human Rights Code." She was an assistant controller with the company as of January 2010, until the date of termination. A letter dated May 19, 2011, advised Ms. Wilson that she would be terminated due to the sale of a sector of the business that made several existing positions within the company superfluous.

Prior to termination, Ms. Wilson, through her doctor had requested time off of work, dated March 7, 2011, in order to heal a recurring back issue. On March 28, 2011, once again through her doctor, Ms. Wilson informed her employer that she would be able to return to work on modified duties that included 4-hour work days beginning the week of April 4, with the promise of full 8-hour days commencing by April 18. The employer found this to be unacceptable and requested further information, which was promptly provided. One final twist in the lead up to the dismissal includes an unexpected letter from Ms. Wilson's doctor, which was dated April 28, 2011, simply stating that her client would need to be off of work until June 15, 2011. The case transcripts do not provide any further communication between this last request and the time of termination.

The specific case subsection on the Cassels Brock Lawyers website outlines the decision of this case when it states that, "The Ontario Superior Court awarded $20,000 to the employee after finding that her ongoing back problems and related requests for accommodation were a factor in the employer’s decision to terminate, despite the employer’s argument that her termination was part of a corporate reorganization."
