= 2022 University of California academic workers' strike =

Strike in California, United States

- Academic workers picket during the strike at the University of California, Davis
- Date: November 14, 2022 - December 23, 2022
- Location: University of California campuses, California, United States
- Goals: Increased wages; Increased benefits
- Methods: Strike action; Work stoppage; Picketing
- Result: Contracts for UAW 2865, UAW 5810, and SRU-UAW

Parties
Student Researchers United-UAW; UAW Local 2865; UAW Local 5810	University of California

The 2022 University of California academic workers' strike was a labor strike at all campuses of the University of California (UC) system, including the Lawrence Berkeley National Laboratory. On November 14, some 48,000 academic workers went on strike for better pay and benefits. Led by the United Auto Workers (UAW) labor union, it was the largest strike in the United States in 2022; union organizers describe it as the largest strike in all of U.S. higher education.

In reaction to the strike, the UC reached tentative agreements with around 12,000 postdoctoral and academic researchers on November 29. On December 9, the contracts were ratified. On December 16, under mediation by Sacramento mayor Darrell Steinberg, the UC reached tentative agreements with around 36,000 academic student employees and student researchers, and the contracts were put to ratification votes by membership. On December 23, the union members voted to ratify both of the remaining contracts and end the strike.

== Background ==
University of California academic workers participating in the strike were organized in four bargaining units represented by three different United Auto Workers unions: Student Researchers United-UAW represents graduate student researchers, UAW Local 2865 represents graduate and undergraduate tutors, teaching assistants and readers, and UAW Local 5810 represents postdoctoral and academic researchers. Though it is primarily known for autoworkers, academic workers now represent a quarter of the UAW membership, 100,000 out of the 400,000 UAW members.

=== Salaries and employee benefits ===
Graduate student workers in the University of California system made an average of $24,000 prior to the strike and asked for a base annual salary of $54,000 for graduate students and $70,000 for postdocs. In contrast, the UC proposed a 4–7% pay increase in the first year and 3% in each year after, claiming it would be within the top pay scale of top public research universities and comparable to private universities.

Negotiations for new contracts between the unions and UC began in Spring 2021. The Los Angeles Times described the unions' demands as wanting "significant pay increases, child-care subsidies, enhanced healthcare for dependents, longer family leave, public transit passes and lower tuition costs for international scholars". Prior to the strike, both sides already came to an agreement on protections against bullying, the first-ever such protections in an academic worker contract.

The unions filed 30 unfair labor practice charges with the Public Employment Relations Board, which has issued seven complaints. These charges included unilaterally implementing changes without worker negotiation, bypassing the bargaining process, refusing to provide necessary information regarding it, and obstructing the process. The UC maintains they have been negotiating "in good faith" and have "recognize[d] the contributions of [their] academic employees"; in addition, they assert that the UC Board of Regents have helped accommodate student housing needs since 2017 and will continue to "add about 25,000 student housing beds over the next five years."

Strike authorization votes were held by the UAW from October 26 to November 2, resulting in a vote to strike with 76% voter participation and more than 97% approval.

== Strike ==
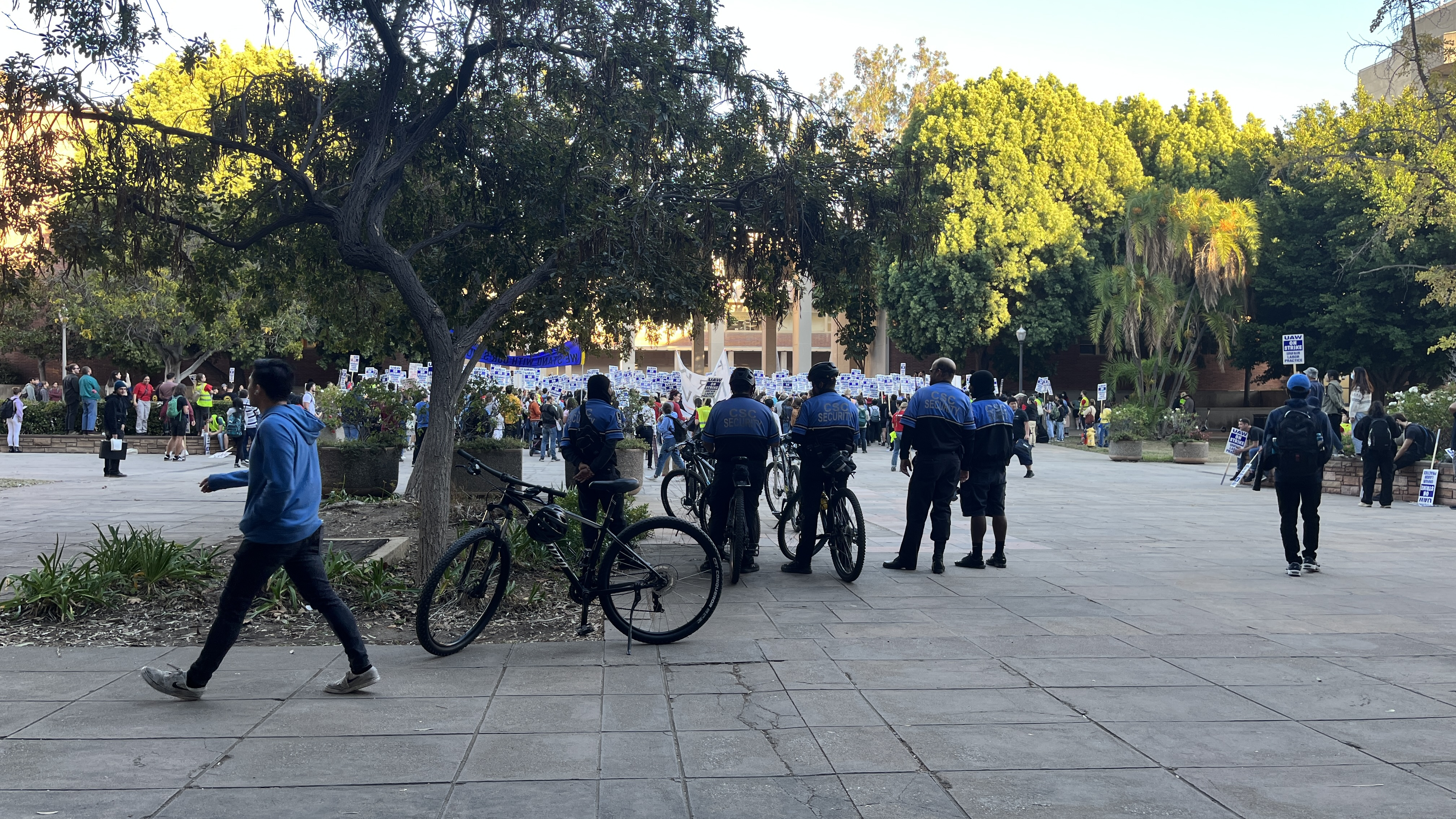
Private security looks on as academic workers strike at UCLA in November 2022

Workers began striking on November 14 as negotiations continue. The UC has asked for a third-party mediator, while the union stated it wants to continue bargaining instead of switching to mediation.

On November 29, a tentative agreement was reached for the about 12,000 postdoctoral and academic researchers in UAW 5810. The agreement includes a 20-23% increase in salary, four more weeks of paid parental and family leave, childcare subsidies, longer appointments, stronger bullying protections and transportation benefits. Those workers would remain on strike in solidarity, but once the contract was ratified by rank-and-file members, they would be obligated not to do so. The contract was then ratified on December 9, with an overwhelming 89.4% approval from postdoctoral scholars and 79.5% approval from academic researchers.

During a sit-in on December 5 at the UC Office of the President in Sacramento, 17 workers were cited for trespassing. The sitting UC president at the time of the 2022 strike was Michael V. Drake. Similarly, on December 7, ten academic workers from UC Los Angeles (UCLA) were arrested at a UC regent's office on trespassing charges.

On December 9, the UC and the remaining bargaining units reached an agreement to involve a private mediator in order to move negotiations forward. Before then, the UC and UAW had held over 60 bargaining sessions, with the UC having made seven formal requests for mediation. Sacramento mayor Darrell Steinberg served as the mediator.

On December 13, 14 protesters were arrested for sitting in during a UC Board of Regents meeting and refusing orders from the UC Police Department to disperse.

On December 16, the 36,000 graduate student researchers and teaching assistants in SRU-UAW and UAW 2865 reached a tentative agreement with the university. Steinberg negotiated the deal at Sacramento City Hall. Under the agreement, the workers would experience an increase in minimum pay from $23,250 to $34,000 for nine months of part-time work, which would provide the lowest-paid workers an 80% pay boost until May 31, 2025. At UC Berkeley, UC San Francisco (UCSF), and UCLA, the minimum pay would increase to $36,500. The agreement would also provide enhanced child care reimbursements, healthcare for dependents, and supplemental tuition for up to three years for eligible international student employees The agreement was left to the rank-and-file members for ratification, after which the strike would officially end.

On December 23, the agreement between UAW 2865 and the university was ratified by 62% (a vote of 11,386 to 7,097), and the agreement between SRU-UAW and the university was ratified by 68% (a vote of 10,057 to 4,640). The 2022 ratification vote had a historically high turnout for graduate student workers, with over 92% of approximately 36,000 eligible workers voting overall. In comparison, only 4,374 workers participated in the previous ratification vote in 2018, with 59% voting yes. The 2022 strike ended with the ratification of these contracts.

== Reactions ==
At UC Davis, the Teamsters Local 2010 and California Nurses Association spoke in solidarity with the academic workers. The Council of UC Faculty Associations is also supported the strike.

U.S. Senator Bernie Sanders and Congresswoman Alexandria Ocasio-Cortez both tweeted in support of the academic workers. A group of California members of the U.S. House of Representatives, including Katie Porter, sent a letter to the UC president expressing their support for the workers.

The Los Angeles Times published an editorial in support of the workers before the strike began, concluding "...these academic workers play such a critical role and deserve to earn enough to pay for basic needs". The California Coalition for Public Higher Education wrote an op-ed in CalMatters calling for the unions to agree to mediation, concerned about the overall impact to the UC budget if workers' demands were met.

After the December 16 tentative agreement, Governor Gavin Newsom stated he was "relieved" by the deal but called the strike "a preview of things to come," as a state budget agreement that provided five years of annual increases to UC funding, he said, would most likely pay for the added costs pertaining to the agreements.

== Impact ==
The strike disrupted grading and classes right before final exams, as well as fully stopping most research. Some professors canceled classes and final exams in solidarity. Over 200 faculty members pledged to stop working, including withholding final grades, until the strike ends. As well, several academic and grading policies at several universities were temporarily suspended or altered in response to the situation.

Two branches of the International Brotherhood of Teamsters approved about 53,000 United Parcel Service employees to not deliver packages to UC campuses for the duration of the strike. Construction workers at UC Berkeley, who are members of the International Union of Operating Engineers, International Brotherhood of Electrical Workers and Laborers’ International Union of North America, paused their work in solidarity. As a result, research laboratories at UC Berkeley were disrupted and had to shut down experiments due to shortage of materials.

== See also ==
- 2020 Santa Cruz graduate students' strike
- 2023 Rutgers University strike
