= 2020 Santa Cruz graduate students' strike =

2020 students' strike against the University of California

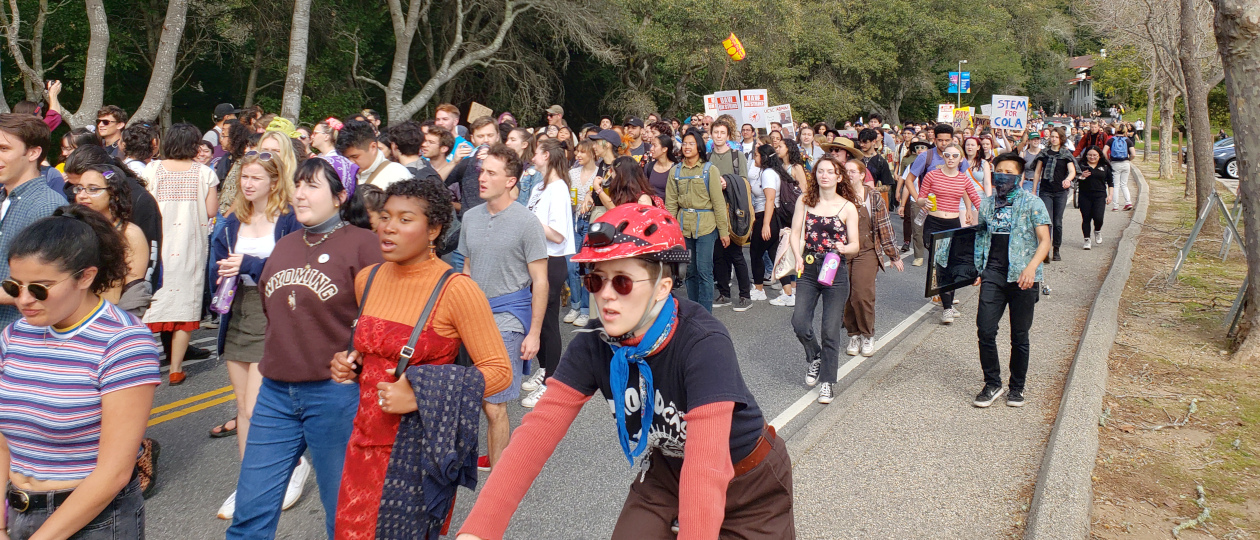
- A student march during the strike
- Date: January 2020 – August 2020
- Location: Santa Cruz, California
- Goals: $1,412 per month cost of living adjustment
- Methods: Wildcat strike actions; Student protests; Demonstrations; Picketing; Internet activism

Parties
Graduate student workers at University of California, Santa Cruz; Santa Cruz unit of United Auto Workers Local 2865; UCSC Graduate Students Association	University of California; University of California, Santa Cruz

Lead figures
various organizers; COLA Cat	Cynthia Larive (chancellor); Lori Kletzer (interim provost); Janet Napolitano (president)

Number
~375 estimated	

Arrests and firings
- Arrested: 17
- Fired: 88 (41 reinstated)

The 2020 Santa Cruz graduate students' strike was a wildcat strike launched against the University of California, Santa Cruz (UCSC).

== Background ==
In August 2018, the University of California (UC) system signed a collective bargaining agreement (CBA) with United Auto Workers (UAW) Local 2865 representing over 19,000 academic student employees, including graduate student teaching assistants, across the UC system. While the contract was originally ratified by a majority of members that participated in voting, 83% of graduate workers from UCSC voted against ratification. With the high cost of living in the Santa Cruz area because of nearby Silicon Valley, many UCSC graduate workers expressed dissatisfaction with the contract since it did not include a cost of living adjustment (COLA). Graduate workers at UCSC spend 50 to 80% of their income on rent, well over the 30% threshold to be considered rent burdened. Seeking parity with University of California, Riverside, union members broke with UAW Local 2865 leadership in an effort to get the university system to pay for the $1,412 per month wage increase. Simultaneously, organizers were elected into the graduate student association on a COLA slate.

== Wildcat strike actions ==
By the end of 2019, graduate student instructors and teaching assistants engaged in a "grading strike" by refusing to submit over 12,000 fall-quarter grades for undergraduate students. This amounted to roughly 20% of all UCSC grades not being received by the December 18 deadline.

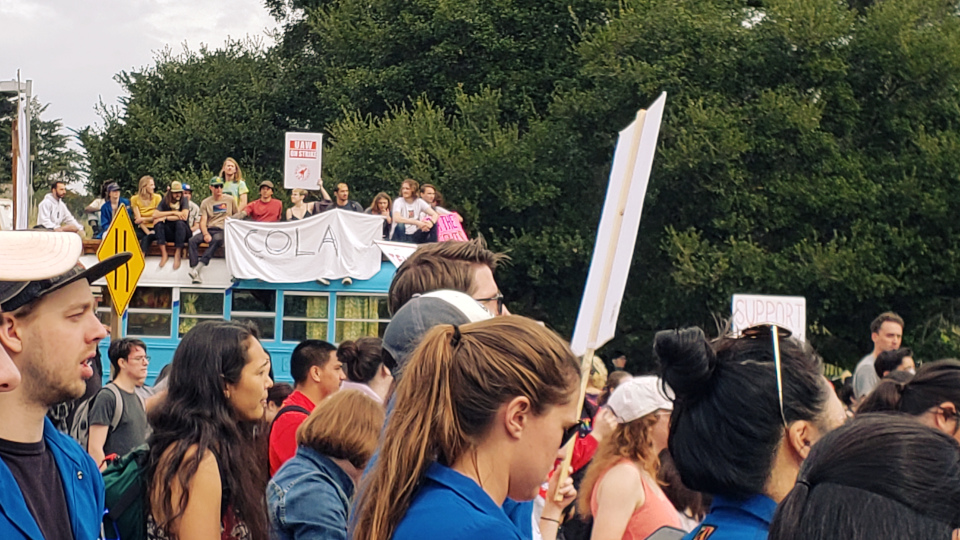
Protesters at a rally on February 21

On February 10, tensions escalated when graduate students initiated demonstrations which sought to block traffic flow in and out of campus. Tony Boardman, a co-president of the UCSC Graduate Student Association who was participating in the strike, estimated that about 350 of graduate student workers took part with hundreds of undergraduate student protesters. Several hundred undergraduates as well as many faculty members marched in solidarity and picketed alongside them, shutting down both entrances to UCSC for hours on Friday, February 21, with solidarity protests at many of the other UC campuses.

Protesters in support of COLA disrupted a computer science midterm students had been taking on February 27, 2020, for about 5 minutes. Undergraduate students present at the time later posted online to Reddit expressing their frustration and discontent with strikers. Members of the UCSC's COLA movement apologized and claimed to not know there was an ongoing midterm, adding that the disruption was intended to explain their cause to the reluctant STEM students.

== Gaining support ==
Graduate assistants blocked all entrances to the Santa Cruz campus before dawn on March 5, 2020, as part of a day of action for all 10 campuses of a UC-wide COLA movement.

Graduate workers and undergraduate supporters at other UC sister schools, including Santa Barbara, San Diego, Los Angeles, Irvine, Riverside, and Berkeley have staged demonstrations in support of COLA and the striking workers. Graduate students at UC San Diego began a grading strike, withholding grades starting on March 24.

On March 3, the system-wide bargaining committee of UAW 2865 called for a unfair labor practice strike from its entire membership, before voting against authorizing a strike vote. Once ratified by a vote of the membership, the UC system would have to address the unfair labor practices in order to prevent a strike. However, these negotiations were sidetracked by the COVID-19 pandemic, and the transition to remote learning. UAW then released specific COVID related closure demands.

== Reaction and effects ==
In a message circulated on January 6, interim provost Lori Kletzer stated that "[The grading strike] has made meeting and working together impossible... and has delayed the implementation of plans to better support graduate students." Later in the same month, UCSC Chancellor Cynthia Larive voiced her disapproval of the strikes as well as citing the potential harm to undergraduate students.

In an open letter published on February 14, Janet Napolitano, then president of the UC system, wrote that the wildcat strike "is the wrong way to go." And that "participation in the wildcat strike will have consequences, up to and including the termination of existing employment at the University." In a response letter published February 19, the UC Academic Council called on Napolitano not to retaliate against striking graduate students and to lessen the police presence on campus. Three-hundred faculty at UCSC signed a letter promising not to retaliate against students demonstrating for higher pay. Similar letters garnered hundreds of faculty signatures at Berkeley and Davis.

As of February 2020, at least 17 protesters were arrested. On February 28, 2020, more than 82 graduate students were terminated of employment for participating in the strike, causing them to lose their health insurance during the COVID-19 pandemic. As a part of negotiations following the unfair labor practice vote, the UC system reinstated these workers' health insurance.

More than 500 graduate students across 22 departments pledged not to take teaching assistant positions made vacant by the firing of student strikers.

Graduate students at universities across the country issued statements of support, including the University of North Carolina at Chapel Hill, University of Notre Dame, and University of Mississippi.

On August 11, 2020, UCSC reinstated 41 graduate students who were fired in March.

== See also ==
- 2020 Michigan graduate students' strike
- 2018–2019 education workers' strikes in the United States
- 2018–2022 UK higher education strikes
- Howard University sit-ins
- Strikes during the COVID-19 pandemic
- 2022 University of California academic workers' strike
