= Price gouging =

Price increases perceived as excessive

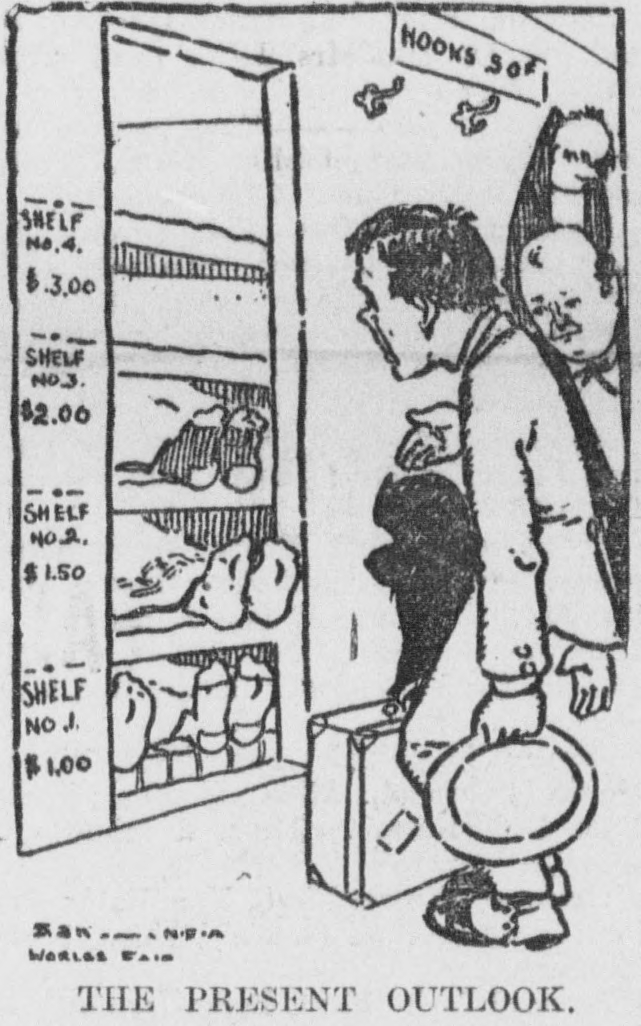
1904 cartoon warning attendees of the St. Louis World's Fair of hotel room price gouging

Price gouging is a pejorative term for the practice of increasing the prices of goods, services, or commodities to a level much higher than is considered reasonable or fair by some. This commonly applies to price increases of basic necessities after natural disasters. Usually, this event occurs after a demand or supply shock. The term can also be used to refer to profits obtained by practices inconsistent with a competitive free market, or to windfall profits. In some jurisdictions of the United States during civil emergencies, price gouging is a specific crime. Price gouging is considered by some to be exploitative and unethical and by others to be a simple result of supply and demand.

Price gouging is similar to profiteering but can be distinguished by being short-term and localized and by being restricted to essentials such as food, clothing, shelter, medicine, and equipment needed to preserve life and property. In jurisdictions where there is no such crime, the term may still be used to pressure firms to refrain from such behavior. The term is used directly in laws and regulations in the United States and Canada, but legislation exists internationally with similar regulatory purpose under existing competition laws.

It is sometimes used to refer to practices of a coercive monopoly that prices above the market rate by deliberately curtailing production. Alternatively, it may refer to suppliers' benefiting to excess from a short-term change in the demand curve.

Price gouging became highly prevalent in news media in the wake of the COVID-19 pandemic, when state price gouging regulations went into effect due to the national emergency. The rise in public discourse was associated with increased shortages related to the COVID-19 pandemic. The resulting inflation after the pandemic has also been blamed, at least in part, by some on price gouging. During the pandemic, the idea of "greedflation" or "seller's inflation" also moved out of the progressive economics fringe by 2023 to be embraced by some mainstream economists, policymakers and business press.

== Laws against price gouging ==
=== United States ===
As of March 2021, Proskauer Rose counted 42 states that have emergency regulations or price-gouging statutes. Price-gouging is often defined in terms of the three criteria listed below:

1. Period of emergency: The majority of laws apply only to price shifts during a declared state of emergency or disaster.
2. Necessary items: Most laws apply exclusively to items essential to survival, such as food, water, and housing.
3. Price ceilings: Laws limit the maximum price that can be charged for given goods.

Washington state does not have a specific statute addressing price gouging, can nevertheless have sought to apply its consumer protection act to argue that high prices during COVID-19 for PPE was an "unfair" or "deceptive" practice.

==== When the law goes into effect ====
Statutory prohibitions on price gouging become effective once a state of emergency has been declared. States have legislated different requirements for who must declare a state of emergency for the law to go into effect. Some state statutes that prohibit price gouging—including those of Alabama, Florida, Mississippi, and Ohio—prohibit price increases only once the President of the United States or the state's governor has declared a state of emergency in the impacted region. California permits emergency proclamations by officials, boards, and other governing bodies of cities and counties to trigger the state's price gouging law.

==== What the law prohibits ====
State laws vary on what price increases are permitted during a declared disaster. California has set a 10 percent ceiling on price increases. The law includes exceptions for price increases that can be justified in terms of the increased cost of supply, transportation, demand, or storage. Florida prohibits a price increase "that grossly exceeds the average price" of that same item in the 30 days leading up to the emergency declaration. Alabama state law does not define what constitutes a "gross disparity", making it difficult for either affected residents or law enforcement to determine when price gouging has occurred, while others merely limit vendors and landlords to price increases of less than 25 percent.

==== Enforcement ====
Enforcement of anti-price gouging statutes can be difficult because of the exceptions often contained within the statutes and the lack of oversight mechanisms. Statutes generally give wide discretion not to prosecute. In 2004, Florida determined that one-third of complaints were unfounded, and a large fraction of the remainder was handled by consent decrees, rather than prosecution.

==== California ====
California Penal Code 396 prohibits price gouging, generally defined as anything greater than a 10 percent increase in price on items such as rent, hotel lodging, gasoline, food, and other essentials, once a state of emergency has been declared. Unlike other states that require the President of the United States or the state's governor to declare a state of emergency, California allows emergency proclamations by officials, boards, and other governing bodies of cities and counties to trigger C.P.C. § 396. The prohibition lasts for up to 30 days at a time and may be renewed as necessary.

In the wake of the 2017 California wildfires and the 2018 California wildfires, Governor Jerry Brown repeatedly extended the price-gouging ban for impacted counties. One of his last acts as governor was to extend the prohibitions until May 31, 2019.

Until 2018, the state had no limitations on the rent that could be charged for housing that was not on the market until after a disaster. Due to complaints from the district attorney that she could not prosecute high priced new rentals which came on the market after the Tubbs Fire, the legislature amended C.P.C. § 396.

The above 2018 price gouging law makes it illegal to offer a previously unrented property for more than about $10,000 per month during an emergency. It also prohibits landlords from increasing rent prices by more than 10% when an emergency is declared. Landlords are also prohibited from accepting fees above this amount even if the tenant submits an offer well above the asking price. In the wake of the January 2025 Palisades Fire, this price cap has made it harder for displaced people to find housing, because many comparable properties normally rent for more than this, and this rent cap discourages owners of high-end vacation homes from making their homes available for rent. One expert estimated that hundreds to thousands more homes might be available for rent if this rent cap did not exist.

==== Florida ====
Florida's "state of emergency" law criminalizes price gouging. A supplier of essential goods and services may be charged when it sharply raises prices in anticipation of or during a civil emergency or when it cancels or dishonors contracts in order to take advantage of an increase in prices related to such an emergency. The model case is a retailer who increases the price of existing stocks of milk and bread when a hurricane is imminent. Though the effect of such laws have been proven to actually increase the risk of extreme shortages since the absence of increased prices replaces higher prices with an incentive for the earliest person to market to obtain all of a product about to imminently experience a period of very high demand.

In Florida, it is a defense to show that the price increase mostly reflects increased costs, such as running an emergency generator or hazard pay for workers, while California places a ten percent cap on any increases.

=== United Kingdom ===
Laws and regulations in the United Kingdom do not use the phrase "price gouging" in consumer protection regulation but are similar to U.S. laws. Chapter II of the UK Competition Act 1998 prohibits businesses with market dominance from engaging in "abusive" conduct, including "unfair" pricing. Market dominance is considered when a business has greater than 40% of the market share within their respective industry. In the case of a violation of Chapter II, a business can be forced to pay up to 10% of global revenues.

=== European Union ===
Similar to UK regulations, the EU does not include "price gouging" explicitly in regulation. Article 102 of the Treaty on the Functioning of the European Union is "aimed at preventing undertakings who hold a dominant position in a market from abusing that position." As stated, "such abuse may, in particular, consist in: (a) directly or indirectly imposing unfair purchase or selling prices or other unfair trading conditions..." In 2016, the EU Commissioner for Competition Margrethe Vestager stated that the EU Commission will "intervene directly to correct excessively high prices" specifically within the gas industry, pharmaceutical industry and in cases of abuse of standard-essential patents.

== Price gouging and COVID-19 ==
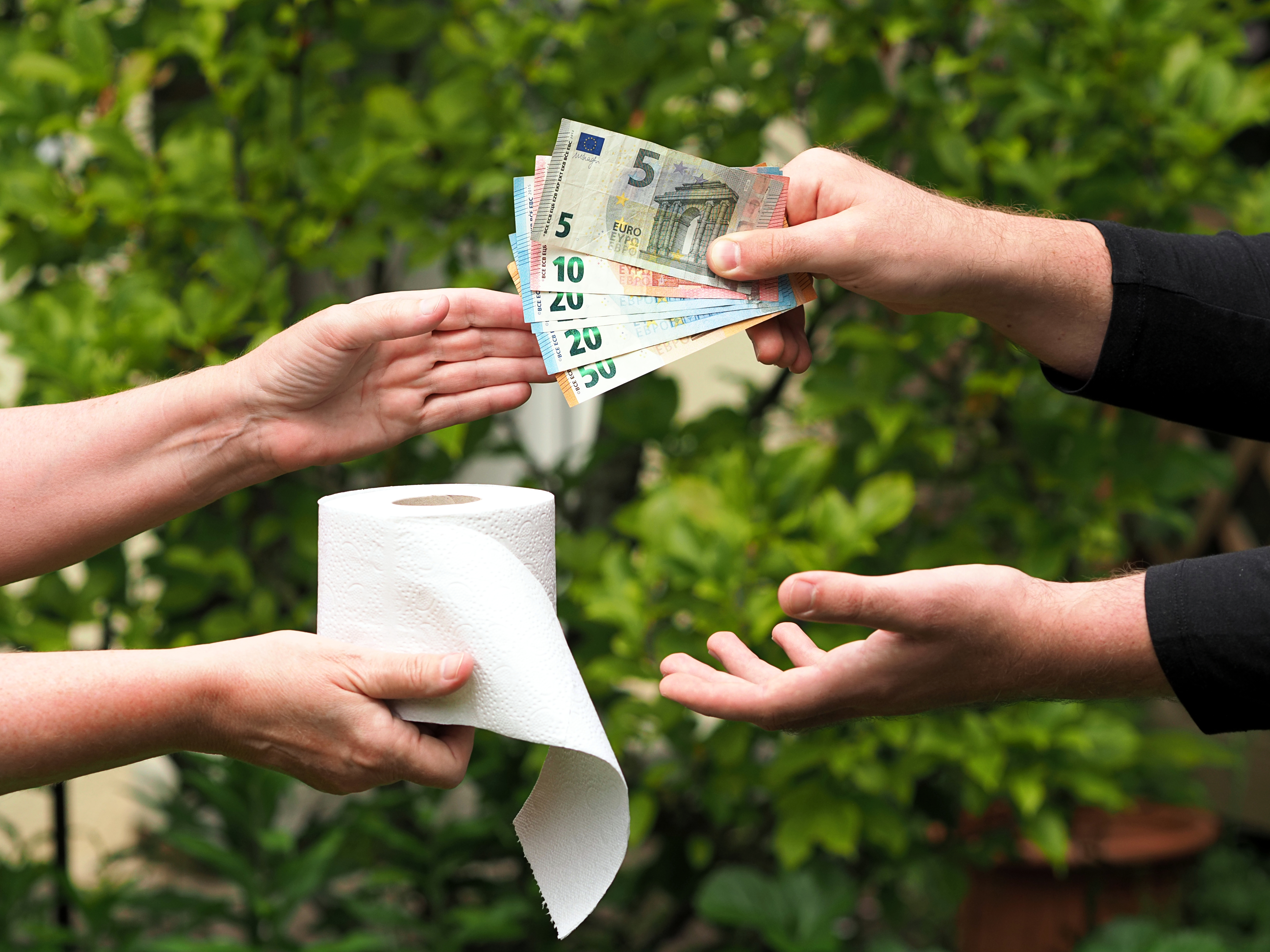
In the early stages of the COVID-19 pandemic, there were shortages of some consumer goods like toilet paper due to supply chain congestion.

On March 13, 2020, a national emergency was declared in the United States by President Trump in response to the outbreak of the COVID-19 pandemic; the declaration allowed for an initial $50 billion to be used to support states. As studied by the National Institutes of Health, the COVID-19 pandemic induced a panic as mandates were put in place for Americans to stay at home, quarantine, and wear masks. The declared COVID-19 emergency made state-level price gouging laws and regulations go into effect. Demand for certain products increased while supply decreased. Such products in short supply included surgical masks, N95 respirators, hand sanitizer, and toilet paper. More than 30 states' attorneys general urged Facebook, Amazon, Craigslist, eBay, and Walmart to restrict the selling of necessary products at "unconscionable" prices.

=== Effects of anti–price gouging laws during COVID-19 ===
Scholars have studied the economic impact of anti-price gouging law during the COVID-19 pandemic. Based on the analysis of Chakraborti in 2023, he argues that strictly implementing price control may result in products shortages, since the law prohibits price increasing from adapting to demand increasing. In several states, incentives for suppliers to expand production and relocate products to high demanding areas are reduced due to the limit of price increasing, further resulting in empty shelves and longer replenishment times.

The research has concluded that although the law aims to protect consumers, during the time that supply chains are highly strained, it could produce unintended consequences.

=== Online price gouging ===
A 2018 appeals court overturned a lower court ruling, arguing that the dormant commerce clause of the U.S. constitution meant Maryland's anti-price gouging statute was unconstitutional.

==== Online Merchants Guild v. Cameron, 2020 ====
This complaint relates to online merchants selling necessary products on Amazon during the US national state of emergency invoked in response to the COVID-19 pandemic. The Online Merchants Guild, a trade association for online merchants, filed a case in Kentucky on the basis that state regulations against price gouging are unconstitutional in the online marketplace since online merchants are unable to control pricing by state. Judge Gregory Van Tatenhove sided with the Online Merchants Guild on June 23, 2020, saying that the Kentucky Attorney General cannot enforce the price gouging regulations on Amazon sellers. The Sixth Circuit Court of Appeals unanimously overturned that ruling in April of 2021.

=== Price gouging-related lawsuits during the COVID-19 pandemic ===
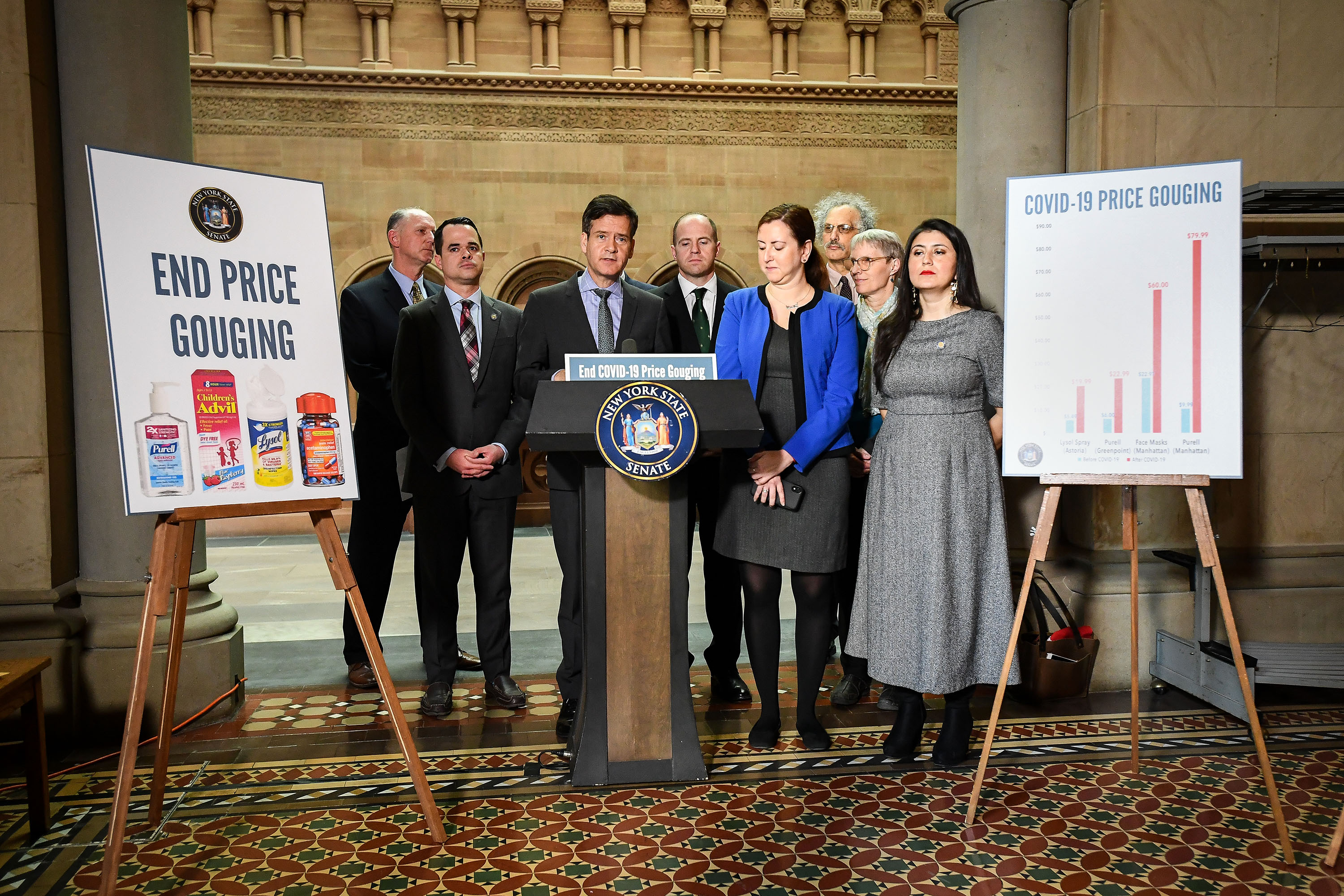
Brad Hoylman-Sigal gives talk against price gouging, 11 March 2020

In response to the issuance of emergency price gouging regulations, multiple state attorneys general and federal agencies have investigated potential cases of price gouging impacting consumers and agencies. Since regulatory measures vary by state, there is no uniform interpretation of price gouging violations, and it is left to state courts to decide.

==== Eggs ====
On August 11, 2020, New York Attorney General Letitia James sued Hillandale Farms, one of the largest U.S. egg producers, for allegedly price gouging more than four million cartons of eggs by increasing prices by almost five times during the pandemic. The lawsuit alleges that the price increases were an effort to profit off of higher consumer demand during the pandemic. To settle the lawsuit, Hillandale Farms agreed to donate 1.2 million eggs to New York food banks.

==== Personal protective equipment ====
A Mississippi businessman purchased scarce personal protective equipment (PPE) including gowns, face shields, and masks through his pharmaceutical wholesale company. An indictment alleges that the business then solicited health care providers, including the U.S. Veteran's Association, to purchase the PPE at excessively inflated prices as part of a $1.8 million scheme. This case was investigated by the FBI, Veteran's Association, and Fraud Section of the United States Department of Justice. The charges brought were conspiracy to commit wire fraud and mail fraud, conspiracy to defraud the United States, conspiracy to commit hoarding of designated scarce materials, and hoarding of designated scarce materials.

== Economic analysis ==
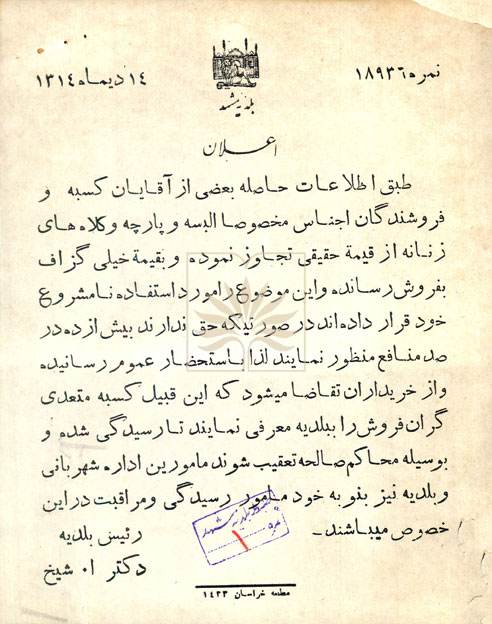
Mashhad municipality announcement against price gouging, January 5, 1936

Allocative efficiency holds that when prices function properly, markets tend to allocate resources to their most valued uses. In turn, those who value the good the most and are able to afford it will pay a higher price than those who do not value the good as much or who are unable to afford it. According to Friedrich Hayek in "The Use of Knowledge in Society" (1945), prices can act to coordinate the separate actions of different people as they seek to satisfy their desires.

Economists such as Thomas Sowell (Chicago School of economics) in 2004, Donald J. Boudreaux in 2005, and Raymond Niles (Senior Fellow at the American Institute for Economic Research) in 2020 argue that laws prohibiting price gouging worsen emergencies for both buyers and sellers.

In a 2012 survey of leading American economists by the Initiative on Global Markets, only 8 percent agreed with a proposal in Connecticut to prohibit "unconscionably excessive" price increases during severe weather events. Those who disagreed stated that the wording was vague or unenforceable, and that restricting price increases leads to misallocation of resources.

=== 2020 to present ===
In 2022, Federal Reserve Bank of St. Louis economist Christopher J. Neely said that "most economists believe broad price controls to be costly and ineffective in most situations" because high prices function to "allocate scarce goods and services to buyers who are most willing and able to pay for them, [and] they signal that a good is valued and that producers can profit by increasing the quantity supplied."

A 2022 Working Paper by the International Monetary Fund explores the implementation of windfall profit taxes, which have gained renewed interest following the COVID-19 pandemic, the war in Ukraine, and subsequent surges in energy and food prices. The paper discusses the potential of such taxes as a tool for efficiently taxing economic rents, which are often a result of monopolistic power or unexpected events like pandemics, war, or natural disasters, and contribute to windfall profits. Such profits have raised public and policy concerns about price gouging, where firms are perceived to be profiting excessively from unforeseen circumstances.

In Australia in 2023 and 2024, major supermarket chains Coles and Woolworths received criticism as price gouging, especially in less competitive markets. Coles and Woolworths control 65% of Australia's grocery market.

In March 2024, the Federal Trade Commission and the National Economic Council accused grocery chains in the U.S. of price gouging.

=== Public perceptions and fairness considerations ===
Studies on public responses to price gouging suggest that assessments are influenced by how fairly the costs are distributed and how balanced the relative economic power is.

One study founds that increasing prices are more likely to be perceived as exploitative when consumers consider firms having more power than them or that they are dependent on them, particularly in contexts of emergency shortage. Public endorsement of anti–price-gouging laws is thus more a matter of perceived fairness than market efficiency, and respondents appear to think that raising prices during a crisis violates implicit social contracts for cooperation and reciprocity.

Overall, these results indicate that public responses to price gouging are not simply driven by economic thinking but rather include moral considerations related to intentions and distribution of power.

== See also ==
- Excess profits tax – Tax on monopoly profits
- Price fixing – Anticompetitive agreement to control prices
- Profit margin – Ratio between turnover and profit
- Usury – Loans with unfairly high interest rate
