= Julie Law =

American molecular and cellular biologist

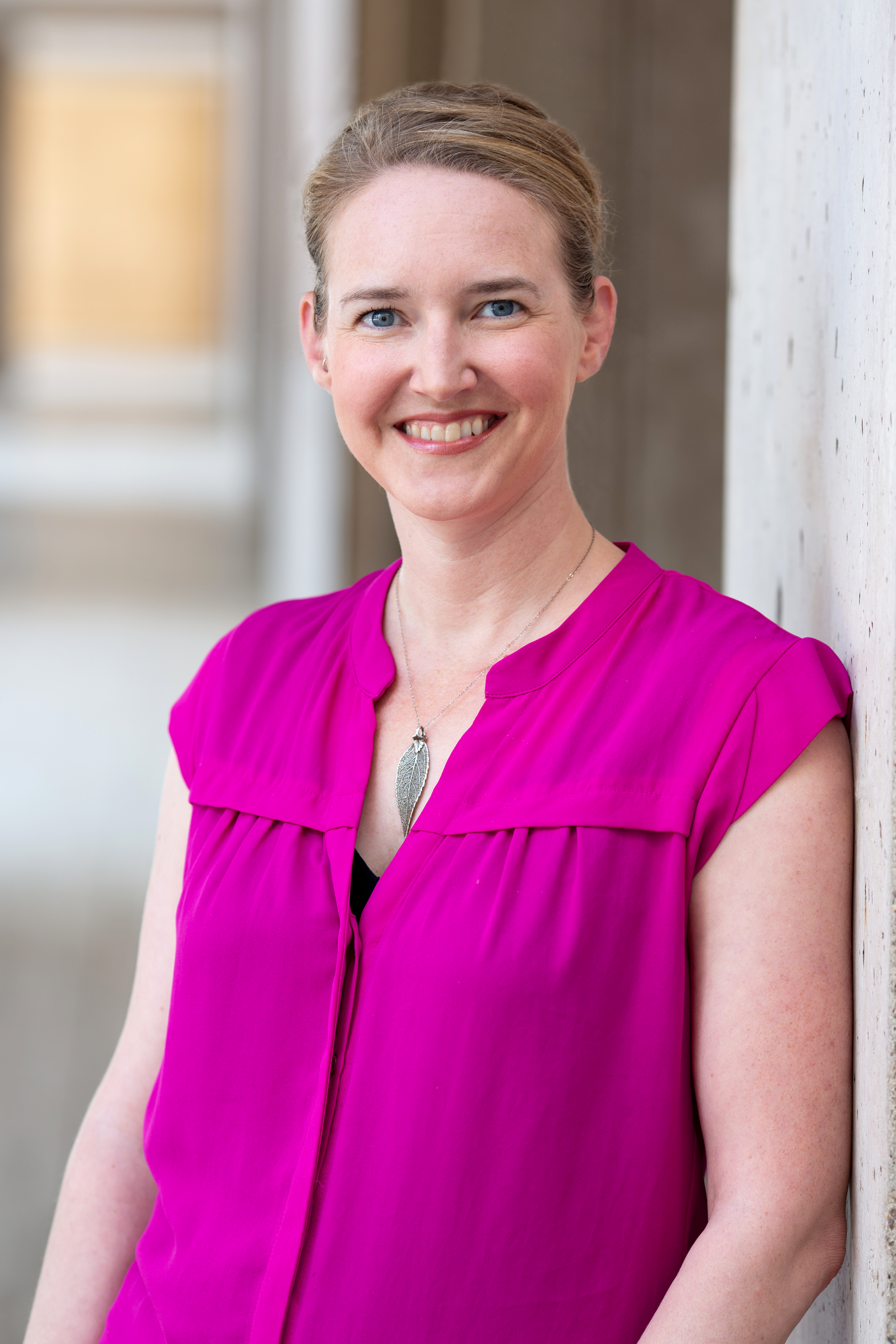
- Education: Oregon State University (B.S.) Johns Hopkins School of Medicine (Ph.D.) University of California, Los Angeles (Postdoctoral fellow)
- Known for: Discovery of protein family that controls DNA methylation
- Awards: Ruth L. Kirschstein National Research Service Award, Rita Allen Scholar, Newsweek magazine “Women of the Future” nominee
- Scientific career
- Fields: Plant Molecular and Cellular Biology, Epigenetics, Chromatin Based Processes
- Workplaces: Salk Institute for Biological Studies
- Doctoral advisor: Dr. Barbara Sollner-Webb

Julie Law (born c. ) is an American molecular and cellular biologist. Law's pioneering work on DNA methylation patterns led to the discovery of the role of the CLASSY protein family in DNA methylation. Law is currently an associate professor at the Salk Institute for Biological Studies.

== Early life and education ==
Law began her scientific career at the Oregon State University where she completed a B.S. in biochemistry and biophysics. She completed her undergraduate research in the laboratory of Dr. Walt Ream. studying plant-microbe interactions She moved to the east coast to complete her doctoral work in biochemistry at Johns Hopkins School of Medicine under the mentorship of Dr. Barbara Sollner-Webb Law's Ph.D. work uncovered the unique RNA editing mechanisms used by pathogenic eukaryotes called trypanosomes. Following her doctoral work, Law moved back to the west coast to pursue postdoctoral training at the University of California, Los Angeles in the lab of Dr. Steven Jacobsen, where she studied DNA methylation in Arabidopsis, a common model organism in biology allowing her to study epigenetic regulation.

== Career and research ==
Law's postdoctoral work, studying DNA methylation at UC Los Angeles, was followed by her recruitment for a faculty position at the Salk Institute for Biological Studies in 2012. Currently, Law's lab at the Salk Institute studies epigenetic modifications in Arabidopsis thaliana to probe how epigenetic tags are recognized by proteins to regulate gene expression. Law is currently working with several other Salk scientists as a part of the Harnessing Plants Initiative to engineer plants to store more carbon dioxide as a means to harness more carbon dioxide from the atmosphere to combat climate change.

== Publications ==
Selected publications:

- Wu, S., Turner, K.M., Nguyen, N., Raviram, R., Erb, M., Santini, J., Luebeck, J., Rajkumar, U., Diao, Y., Li, B., Zhang, W., Jameson, N., Corces, M.R., Granja, J.M., Chen, X., Coruh, C., Abnousi, A., Houston, J., Ye, Z., Hu, R., Yu, M., Kim, H., Law, J.A., Verhaak, R.G.W., Hu, M., Furnari, F.B., Chang, H.Y., Ren, B., Bafna, V., Mischel, P.S. Circular ecDNA promotes accessible chromatin and high oncogene expression. (2019) Nature. 575(7784):699-703. DOI: 10.1038/s41586-019-1763-5
- Argueso, C.T., Assmann, S.M., Birnbaum, K.D., Chen, S., Dinneny, J.R., Doherty, C.J., Eveland, A.L., Friesner, J., Greenlee, V.R., Law, J.A., Marshall-Colón, A., Mason, G.A., O'Lexy, R., Peck, S.C., Schmitz, R.J., Song, L., Stern, D., Varagona, M.J., Walley, J.W., Williams, C.M. Directions for research and training in plant omics: Big Questions and Big Data. (2019) Plant Direct. 3(4):e00133. DOI: 10.1002/pld3.133
- Bourbousse, C., Vegesna, N., Law, J.A. SOG1 activator and MYB3R repressors regulate a complex DNA damage network in . (2018) Proceedings of the National Academy of Sciences of the United States of America. DOI: 10.1073/pnas.1810582115
- Zhou, M., Palanca, A.M.S., Law, J.A. Locus-specific control of the de novo DNA methylation pathway in Arabidopsis by the CLASSY family. (2018) Nature Genetics. 50(6). DOI: 10.1038/s41588-018-0115-y
- Li, D., Palanca, A.M.S., Won, S.Y., Gao, L., Feng, Y., Vashisht, A.A., Liu, L., Zhao, Y., Liu, X., Wu, X., Li, S., Le, B., Kim, Y.J., Yang, G., Li, S., Liu, J., Wohlschlegel, J.A., Guo, H., Mo, B., Chen, X., Law, J.A. The MBD7 complex promotes expression of methylated transgenes without significantly altering their methylation status. (2017) Elife. 6. DOI: 10.7554/eLife.19893
- Zhou, M., Law, J.A. RNA Pol IV and V in gene silencing: Rebel polymerases evolving away from Pol II's rules. (2015) Current Opinion in Plant Biology. 27:154-64. DOI: 10.1016/j.pbi.2015.07.005
- Law, J.A., Du, J., Hale, C.J., Feng, S., Krajewski, K., Palanca, A.M., Strahl, B.D., Patel, D.J., Jacobsen, S.E. Polymerase IV occupancy at RNA-directed DNA methylation sites requires SHH1. (2013) Nature. 498(7454):385-9. DOI: 10.1038/nature12178
- Zhong, X., Hale, C.J., Law, J.A., Johnson, L.M., Feng, S., Tu, A., Jacobsen, S.E. DDR complex facilitates global association of RNA polymerase V to promoters and evolutionarily young transposons. (2012) Nature Structural & Molecular Biology. 19(9):870-5. DOI: 10.1038/nsmb.2354
- Law, J.A., Vashisht, A.A., Wohlschlegel, J.A., Jacobsen, S.E. SHH1, a homeodomain protein required for DNA methylation, as well as RDR2, RDM4, and chromatin remodeling factors, associate with RNA polymerase IV. (2011) PLOS Genetics. 7(7):e1002195. DOI: 10.1371/journal.pgen.1002195
- Greenberg, M.V., Ausin, I., Chan, S.W., Cokus, S.J., Cuperus, J.T., Feng, S., Law, J.A., Chu, C., Pellegrini, M., Carrington, J.C., Jacobsen, S.E. Identification of genes required for de novo DNA methylation in Arabidopsis. (2011) Epigenetics. 6(3):344-54.
- Rajakumara, E., Law, J.A., Simanshu, D.K., Voigt, P., Johnson, L.M., Reinberg, D., Patel, D.J., Jacobsen, S.E. A dual flip-out mechanism for 5mC recognition by the Arabidopsis SUVH5 SRA domain and its impact on DNA methylation and H3K9 dimethylation in vivo. (2011) Genes & Development. 25(2):137-52. DOI: 10.1101/gad.1980311
- Guo, L., Yu, Y., Law, J.A., Zhang, X. SET DOMAIN GROUP2 is the major histone H3 lysine [corrected] 4 trimethyltransferase in Arabidopsis. (2010) Proceedings of the National Academy of Sciences of the United States of America. 107(43):18557-62. DOI: 10.1073/pnas.1010478107
- Law, J.A., Ausin, I., Johnson, L.M., Vashisht, A.A., Zhu, J.K., Wohlschlegel, J.A., Jacobsen, S.E. A protein complex required for polymerase V transcripts and RNA- directed DNA methylation in Arabidopsis. (2010) Current Biology. 20(10):951-6. DOI: 10.1016/j.cub.2010.03.062
- Law, J.A., Jacobsen, S.E. Establishing, maintaining and modifying DNA methylation patterns in plants and animals. (2010) Nature Reviews. Genetics. 11(3):204-20. DOI: 10.1038/nrg2719
- Law, J.A., Jacobsen, S.E. Molecular biology. Dynamic DNA methylation. (2009) Science. 323(5921):1568-9. DOI: 10.1126/science.1172782
- Johnson, L.M., Law, J.A., Khattar, A., Henderson, I.R., Jacobsen, S.E. SRA-domain proteins required for DRM2-mediated de novo DNA methylation. (2008) PLOS Genetics. 4(11):e1000280. DOI: 10.1371/journal.pgen.1000280

== Awards ==
Law has received the following awards:

- 2015 Rita Allen Scholar Award
- 2007 Ruth L. Kirschstein National Research Service Award, National Institutes of Health
- 2000 Howard Hughes Medical Institute Summer Fellowship, Oregon State University
