= Wright County Egg =

Poultry farm based in Galt, Iowa

Wright County Egg (formerly DeCoster Egg Farms), based in Galt, Iowa, is one of the top ten poultry farms in the United States, with a flock of more than 15 million chickens. The company also produces pork.

== History ==
The company was founded by Austin "Jack" DeCoster as a teenager, when his father died. All the family had were several hundred chickens.

=== Litigation ===
In the 1990s and 2000s the company was raided by federal officials several times, and faced litigation. It was charged with violating employment laws by extensive hiring of illegal immigrant workers and maintaining abusive conditions. In addition, 300 undocumented female workers came forward with multiple claims of rape, sexual violence and sexual harassment, but no cases were prosecuted on their behalf. A number of grocery chains boycotted the company in the 1990s over concern for working conditions.

=== Controversy ===
In June 2010, DeCoster pled guilty to animal cruelty charges with respect to the conditions of the egg-laying hens, after Mercy for Animals, an animal rights organization forwarded undercover video footage of company facilities in Maine. In August, 2010, the company recalled 380 million eggs in connection with a salmonella outbreak, and a related company, Hillandale Farms, recalled 170 million eggs. More than 3000 persons reported illnesses traced to contaminated eggs.
