= National Research Service Award =

The Ruth L. Kirschstein National Research Service Awards (usually referred to as NRSA) are a family of grants provided by the United States National Institutes of Health (NIH) for training researchers in the behavioral sciences and health sciences. They are a highly selective and very prestigious source of funding for doctoral and postdoctoral trainees. The grants are awarded based on lengthy proposals submitted by applicants in which original experimental plans are described. The proposals are evaluated and given an impact score reflecting scientific merit by a study section at the Center for Scientific Review at the NIH. Only applications with very good impact scores are funded, based on budget cutoffs determined by each individual institute. US citizenship or permanent residency is required. The NIH awarded $77,000,000 in individual grants and over $600,000,000 in institutional training grants in fiscal year 2005.

NRSA awards are mostly given to students working on a PhD or an MD or other medical degree, or to individuals who have just earned one of these degrees and are beginning their careers. The NRSA program also provides institutions with training grants that can be used to fund one or more students. NRSA grants are notable for their flexibility: postdoctoral researchers can propose to work at any university, and the only requirement is that they commit to at least one year of research in their field following their first year of funding.

== See also ==
- National Postdoctoral Association
