= Postdoctoral researcher unionization =

Formation of labor unions by postdoctoral researchers

Postdoctoral researcher unionization is the formation of labor unions by postdoctoral researchers (postdocs). It has been driven by increasing competition for scarce tenure-track faculty positions, leading to more people residing in postdoctoral positions for a longer time. Unions often challenge the low pay, minimal benefits, and lack of job security that are typical of postdoctoral positions. Unionizing is however sometimes seen as creating a culture clash of tension between postdocs and their academic advisors, and some question the suitability of a union for a temporary position. Some universities seek to avoid pushes for unionization by proactively addressing the concerns of postdoctoral researchers.

Postdoctoral unions exist only at a few universities. They have often been formed with the help of other unions at the same institution; for example, before the University of Massachusetts Amherst union was formed, postdoctoral researchers were the only class of employees not already part of a union. The National Postdoctoral Association, which is a professional association rather than a labor union, is officially neutral on the issue of postdoctoral unionization. The Boston Postdoctoral Association, the largest 501c(6) postdoctoral organization and largest regional organization, has not publicly declared a position on postdoctoral organization.

== History ==
The first stand-alone postdoctoral researcher union was UAW Local 5810 at the University of California system. As of 2010 it represented about 6,400 postdoctoral researchers, which was estimated to be about 10% of the United States total, and is the largest postdoctoral researcher union in North America. Efforts to form this union had begun in the early 2000s, and it was officially formed in 2008. Its first contract was ratified in August 2010. This led to establishing a minimum salary with annual increases, the availability of insurance benefits, guaranteed vacation time, paid maternity leave, and just cause protections for discipline or dismissal.

Postdocs at Rutgers University unionized in July 2009. In 2010, a postdoctoral union at the University of Massachusetts Amherst was formed, and in 2012 it ratified a contract providing for salary and benefits, the first of its kind in the University of Massachusetts system. Postdoctoral unions also exist at the University of Connecticut Health Center and the University of Alaska in the United States, and at McMaster University, the University of Western Ontario, and the Université Laval in Canada. In 2018, the 1,100 postdocs at the University of Washington voted to unionize, becoming the second-largest postdoc union in the United States. Also in 2018, postdocs at Columbia University formed the first certified postdoctoral union at a private university in the United States after successfully petitioning the NLRB, and the postdocs at the University of Connecticut formed a union.

== See also ==
- Graduate student employee unionization
