= UAW Local 5810 =

Labor union of researchers at the University of California

- United Automobile, Aerospace and Agricultural Implement Workers of America Local Union 5810
- Merged into: UAW Local 4811 (February 2024; 2 years ago)
- Formation: August 19, 2008; 18 years ago
- Region served: California
- Members: 11,000 (2024)
- Parent organization: United Auto Workers
- Website: https://uaw5810.org/about/

UAW Local 5810 was the labor union representing postdoctoral researchers and academic researchers at the University of California. It is an affiliate of the International Union, United Automobile, Aerospace and Agricultural Implement Workers of America (UAW) or AFL–CIO. It was merged into UAW Local 4811 in March 2024 when the UAW International Executive Board voted to approve the amalgamation of academic student employees, graduate student researchers (formerly of UAW Local 2865) and academic researchers and postdoctoral workers (formerly of UAW Local 5810) into UAW Local 4811. UAW Local 5810 was chartered in 2008. The stand-alone postdoctoral scholar contract and academic researcher contract negotiated between UC and UAW are notable for being the first of their kind in the United States, respectively.

== Membership ==
Local 5810 represented over 6,000 postdoctoral researchers at the University of California, which was roughly one-tenth of all postdoctoral researchers in the United States. Local 5810 also represented 5,000 academic researchers at the University of California.

UC postdocs work in all fields of the academy, but are overwhelmingly concentrated in the fields of science, technology, engineering and math (STEM). Postdocs perform highly technical work, often under exacting conditions. Prior to ratification of their first contract, the majority of postdocs at UC were paid less than $41,000 per year.

In 2019, other nontenured research staff at UC elected to unionize and join UAW 5810 under the umbrella term Academic Researchers.

== Formation ==
In 2005, a group of postdoctoral researchers employed by the UC, many of whom were previously members of UAW Local 2865 and other local unions representing academic student employees, approached the UAW and asked for help forming a union. The group began an organizing drive as Postdoctoral Researchers Organize/UAW or PRO/UAW.

On August 19, 2008, the California Public Employment Relations Board (PERB) certified that a majority of UC postdocs had chosen PRO/UAW as their union. Contract negotiations began in February 2009.

== Contract negotiations ==
Negotiations of the first contract, which spanned a year and a half, were protracted and contentious. During that time, union supporters picketed at all ten University of California campuses. On April 30, 2010, the House of Representatives Committee on Education and Labor held a field hearing at UC Berkeley to evaluate the unusually lengthy amount of time it was taking to reach agreement.

During the hearing, Vice President of Human Resources for the University of California Dwaine Duckett testified that the delay was due to difficulty tracking complex funding formulas used to allocate postdoc salaries. A postdoctoral researcher also testified about her difficult experience as an expectant and new mother within the UC system.

After the hearing, Committee Chairman George Miller wrote UC President Mark Yudof expressing "deep concern" about UC's slow-paced approach, saying he "left the hearing thoroughly disappointed" in UC's efforts to reach agreement. Congressman Miller was then joined by Congresswoman Barbara Lee and Congresswoman Lynn Woolsey in sending a letter to the Government Accountability Office asking the agency to look into "how universities, including the University of California, track how funds provided for laboratory research grants are spent."

=== First contract ===
The contract was ratified on August 11, 2010 with 96 percent of the vote, and made significant advances in pay, health benefits and safety on the job for postdocs. Postdoc negotiators were successful in linking minimum salaries to an experience-based scale set by the NIH for NRSA Postdoctoral Fellowships. UC postdocs are guaranteed minimum salary increases with every year of experience.

=== Second contract ===
As of September 2015, the union was in negotiations for a second contract.

== 2022 strike ==
Along with Student Researchers United-UAW and UAW Local 2865, members began striking on November 14, 2022. After mediation by Sacramento mayor Darrell Steinberg, the sides reached an agreement for increased pay, pending ratification by union members.
