= Hazard pay =

Extra pay for hazardous work

Hazard pay or danger money (British English) is income in addition to regular wages given for performing work under hazardous or dangerous conditions. Hazardous work means that use of reasonable protective gear does not adequately mitigate the inherent risks involved in the work, wherein harm or death could result.

== Examples ==
=== COVID-19 pandemic in the United States ===
In Detroit, Michigan, the municipal government paid certain public employees an additional $5 per hour to perform their jobs during the coronavirus outbreak from April to June 2020.

In the United States, a group of federal employees from various agencies filed a failed lawsuit attempting to force the government to pay hazard pay during the COVID-19 pandemic.
