= UAW Local 4811 =

Labor union of academic workers at the University of California

United Auto Workers Local 4811
- United Automobile, Aerospace and Agricultural Implement Workers of America Local Union 4811
- Abbreviation: UAW 4811
- Formation: June 1, 2000; 26 years ago (as UAW 2865); February 23, 1984; 42 years ago (as AGSE)
- Founded at: University of California, Berkeley
- Merger of: UAW Local 2865; UAW Local 5810; Student Researchers United-UAW
- Type: Local union
- Headquarters: Berkeley, California
- Region served: California
- Members: 60,000 (2026); 48,000 (2024); 8,000 (2000)
- President: Rafael Jaime
- Parent organization: United Auto Workers
- Website: https://www.uaw4811.org/

UAW Local 4811 (UAW 4811) is the local union of United Auto Workers representing academic student employees, graduate student researchers, postdoctoral scholars, academic researchers, and student services and advising professionals at 10 campuses of the University of California system and the Lawrence Berkeley National Laboratory, with the exception of the University of California College of the Law, San Francisco.

== History ==
=== Formation ===
In the early 1980s, graduate student workers at the University of California, Berkeley began to organize a labor union known as Association of Graduate Student Employees (AGSE). In 1984, AGSE ally California state assemblymember Tom Bates introduced Assembly Bill 3251 into that year's session, which would have extended collective bargaining rights to graduate student employees, who were classified as apprentices rather than workers. At the same time, 1,300 AGSE members struck to pressure the university to recognize their union. This bill failed in May of that year, but this event officially inaugurated the precursor to the current graduate student union at the UC. In 1987, AGSE affiliated with the UAW, however Teaching Assistants would not be recognized as employees by the state of California until 1999, following a series of high participation strikes the year prior. UAW 2865 was officially formed in 2000, representing 8,000 Teaching Assistants, when members ratified its first contract which codified a wage of $13,500/yr, on average. This contract excluded Graduate Student Researchers, who remained categorized as apprentices until 2017.

=== SRU-UAW merger ===
After the ratification of the contracts won in 2022, the joint councils of UAW 2865 and SRU-UAW voted to merge the new graduate student researcher bargaining units into the existing UAW 2865 academic student employee (ASE) units—forming one union of 36,000 academic student workers.

=== 2865–5810 Amalgamation ===
Following the SRU merger and coordination between both unions in their 2022 strike, from October 10–20, 2023 UAW locals 5810 and 2865 put an amalgamation referendum to members, weighing whether to combine the two unions. Over 11,000 workers participated in the vote, with 92% in favor of amalgamation. The UAW International Executive Board approved the amalgamation in late February 2024, officially combining the two unions into one comprising 48,000 workers and numerated Local 4811.

=== UC Law San Francisco ===
In April 2024, 200 graduate student workers at the UC College of the Law, San Francisco voted to form a union with UAW. The campaign, known as "United Legal Educators" ratified an initial contract in January 2026, and subsequently voted to join the UAW 4811 ASE unit.

=== UC Staff Organizing ===
In November 2024, 5,000 UC employees who work in student support and allied titles across UC campuses formed a union with UAW via card check, in a bargaining unit titled "Student Services and Advising Professionals," or "SSAP-UAW." This was followed in September 2025, by 7,200 research support employees voting to form a union, called "Research and Public Services Professionals," or "RPSP-UAW." In January 2026, SSAP and RPSP units voted to authorize an unfair labor practice strike, alongside UAW 4811 ASEs. In March 2026, 2,000 UC communications, marketing, and sales staff voted to form a union with UAW, as a unit called "ComMaS." In May 2026, the SSAP and RPSP bargaining units officially joined UAW 4811 after ratifying initial contracts, expanding the local's total number of represented workers to over 60,000. Also in May 2026, 250 Research Scientists at LBNL joined UAW 4811. In September 2026 1,500 Educational Specialists at UC voted to form a union with UAW.

== Direct actions ==
=== 2022 strike ===
After several years of coordination, in 2022 UAW Local 2865, UAW Local 5810, and the graduate student researcher organizing campaign, SRU-UAW, struck together for six weeks beginning on November 14. The 5810 represented postdoctoral scholar and academic researcher units reached tentative agreements with the university on November 29, which were ratified by membership vote on December 9. The student worker units reached tentative agreements on December 16, which were ratified by membership vote on December 23—ending the strike. This strike was the largest higher education strike in United States history.

=== 2024 Unfair Labor Practice strike ===
Soon after amalgamation, UAW Local 4811 was called upon to respond and support action by UC student protestors, including students leading the Students for Justice in Palestine protests and encampments at UC campuses. After the violent attack by non-campus individuals on pro-Palestine student protestors at UCLA and the subsequent police crackdown on May 1 and 2, 2024, UAW Local 4811 issued a statement announcing that it would hold a strike authorization vote in the following week. The union, in its statement, also called for UCLA Chancellor Gene Block to resign immediately given what they called his "failure of leadership." The 2024 strike took place over the course of three weeks starting on May 20, 2024, each of which saw new campuses join—following the "stand up" strategy of the 2023 United Auto Workers strike. The strike ended on June 7, 2024 after the university circumvented the California Public Relations Board by forum shopping for a temporary restraining order against the strike in Orange County Superior Court.

== See also ==
- Graduate student employee unionization
- List of graduate student employee unions
- Postdoctoral researcher unionization
