= Jack DeCoster =

American egg farmer and business executive

Austin "Jack" DeCoster (born 1934 or 1935) is an American egg farmer and business executive. He founded Wright County Egg as a teenager.

DeCoster was raised in Turner, Maine. He began farming at the age of 12, starting with 250 chickens. He founded Quality Egg in Turner in 1961.

On August 30, 1979, DeCoster sold DeCoster Egg Farms, Inc. to Acton Food Services Corporation for $17.2 million. He maintained a role with Main Egg Producers, a spinoff company, and devoted his fulltime attention to a new operation in Maryland. He rebought DeCoster Egg Farms in the on May 22, 1985, in an auction.

DeCoster has a history of violations relating to labor, environmental, and public health offenses. In 2015 he and his son, Peter DeCoster, were sentenced to three months in prison by a federal court in Iowa after pleading guilty to selling contaminated eggs from their farms there. They each also paid a $100,000 fine, while their company, Quality Egg, was fined $6.79 million after pleading guilty to bribing federal inspectors and other charges. Federal prosecutors had alleged the DeCosters knew their eggs were contaminated with salmonella but allowed them to go to market, triggering an outbreak that is estimated to have sickened more than 56,000 people.
