= Hillandale Farms =

American egg producing company

Hillandale Farms is one of the largest suppliers of chicken eggs in the United States. Headquartered in Greensburg, Pennsylvania, it was founded in 1958 by Orland Bethel.

== History ==
Hillandale Farms was founded in 1958 by Westmoreland County, Pennsylvania resident Orland Bethel. It has a corporate office in Greensburg, Pennsylvania, a distribution center in Plum, Pennsylvania, and egg producing locations in Pennsylvania, Ohio, and Connecticut.also West Union Iowa

In 2010, Hillandale was partially responsible for a salmonella outbreak. One of the egg farms federal food safety officials traced the outbreak to was a Hillandale facility in Iowa. Jack DeCoster and his son Peter DeCoster, owners of a Hillandale facility in Turner, Maine, received a three-month sentence for their role in the 2010 salmonella outbreak that was linked to their egg producing sites in Iowa. The company paid a $6.8 million fine as part of the plea deal. The Hillandale Iowa farm recalled 170 million eggs.

In 2015, a subsidiary of Hillandale Farms leased three farms in Turner, Leeds, and Winthrop. The three farms were previously leased by a subsidiary of Land O'Lakes.

By 2016, Pennsylvania-based Hillandale Farms operated 10 egg production facilities in the United States. In June 2016, the Humane Society of the United States released an undercover video of a Hillandale facility in Turner, Maine depicting egg-laying hens in rusty small wire cages.

On July 1, 2017, a fire killed over 100,000 chickens at a Hillandale farm in Tyrone Township, Pennsylvania. In February 2020, there was a proposal by Maine representative Margaret O'Neil to require egg produces to follow cage free housing systems. At its peak, DeCoster Egg Farm (later called Hillandale Farms), produced 5 million egg laying hens. By February 2020, this was closer to 1 million. Stephen Vendemia, president of Hillandale operator Hillandale Farms Conn LLC stated that the company was agreeable but may not be able to meet the proposed bill's 2024 deadline.

On August 11, 2020, New York Attorney General Letitia James sued Hillandale Farms for allegedly price gouging more than four million cartons of eggs by increasing prices by almost five times during the pandemic. The lawsuit alleges that the price increases were an effort to profit off of higher consumer demand during the pandemic. To settle the lawsuit, Hillandale Farms agreed to donate 1.2 million eggs to New York food banks. The case was dismissed with prejudice.

In 2021, Hillandale Farms' accountant, Jonathan A. Weston, was indicted by a federal grand jury for embezzling $6.8 million between October 2005 and January 2019. A Hillandale Farms bookkeeper and secretary was a co-conspirator.

In October 2021, Hillandale shut down its egg processing plant in Turner, Maine.

On January 28, 2023 a fire killed about 100,000 chickens at a Hillandale farm in Bozrah, Connecticut.
