= Howard University sit-ins =

- Date: March 30, 2018–April 6, 2018
- Location: Washington, D.C.
- Caused by: Misappropriation of money
- Goals: The resignation of Frederick and the board of trustees.; That students "have the power to democratically influence the decisions of the administration and the board of trustees by way of popular vote."; Having Howard do more to combat food insecurity and gentrification in the area.; The disarming of campus police, and the creation of a police oversight committee.; The hiring of more school counselors; The creation of a grievance system in which faculty can be held accountable for their "language and actions toward students and marginalized identities."
- Methods: Sit-ins

Parties
| HU Resist | Howard University |

Lead figures
| Alexis McKenney | |

The Howard University sit-ins were a series of nonviolent protests at the Howard University in Washington, D.C. in 2018. The protests were called over students at the university accusing the university's administration for misusing funding. The protests began on March 30 and ended on April 6, 2018.

== Reactions ==
The Chronicle of Higher Education said that such a sit-in could lead to several other student sit-ins across the nation with students disgruntled at the university administration's handling of finances and social policy.
