= Student Researchers United-UAW =

Student researcher union in California

SRU-UAW
- Student Researchers United–United Auto Workers
- Merged into: UAW Local 2865 (November 2023; 2 years ago)
- Formation: 2021; 5 years ago
- Region served: California
- Parent organization: United Auto Workers
- Website: https://studentresearchersunited.org/

Student Researchers United-UAW (SRU-UAW) was a union organizing drive of student researchers at the University of California (UC). It was part of the United Auto Workers. The campaign was composed of more than 17,000 people who work across 10 UC campuses and the Lawrence Berkeley National Laboratory. They were the largest 2021 addition to the UAW, accounting for 0.1% of union members in the US, and, according to organizers, were "the largest academic student employee union in US history." The campaign joined UAW Local 2865 in 2023 and ceased to be an independent entity.

== History ==
=== Beginnings ===
Research assistants were not considered employees in California until the passage of state legislation from Nancy Skinner, SB 201, in 2017. The UC opposed this legislation. Planning for the union began in early 2020.

=== 2021 ===
To advocate for the union, organizers submitted more than 10,000 union authorization cards to California's Public Employers Relations Board and gathered more than 5,000 signatures from student researchers on a resolution in support of union recognition. In October 2021, a group of congresspeople that included a majority of the California congressional delegation and was led by Katie Porter sent a letter to Michael V. Drake, president of the UC, in support of the union. A group of 49 state legislators led by Buffy Wicks sent a similar letter on November 18, 2021. In November 2021, a majority of student workers voted to strike. The University of California recognized the union in December 2021.

=== 2022 ===
SRU-UAW members were among the 36,500 academic workers who participated in a strike authorization vote that concluded on November 2, 2022, with more than 97% approving. The strike began on November 14 and ended December 23 with 69% of SRU-UAW voting to ratify their first contract.

=== 2023 ===
The joint council (comprising executive board members of UAW Locals 2865 and 5810) voted for SRU-UAW to adjoin UAW Local 2865, forming one local with a single bargaining unit for all graduate student workers, a group that includes teaching assistants, tutors, readers, graduate student researchers, trainees, and fellows.
