= Postdoctoral researcher =

Person professionally conducting research after the completion of doctoral studies

Occupation
- Occupation type: Profession
- Activity sectors: Academia, Industry

Description
- Competencies: Research; Teaching
- Education required: PhD or equivalent
- Fields of employment: Academics, Industry

Post-doctoral researchers by discipline (United States, 2012)
1. Life sciences (65.0%)
2. Physical sciences (13.0%)
3. Engineering (11.0%)
4. Math and computer sciences (3.00%)
5. Geosciences (3.00%)
6. Psychology, social sciences and others (5.00%)

A postdoctoral fellow, postdoctoral researcher, or simply postdoc, is a person professionally conducting research after the completion of their doctoral studies (typically a PhD). Postdocs most commonly, but not always, have a temporary academic appointment during which time they are expected to professionalize by publishing papers and completing research, typically in preparation for a more permanent academic faculty position. According to data from the US National Science Foundation, the number of holders of PhD in biological sciences who end up in tenure track has consistently dropped from over 50% in 1973 to less than 20% in 2006. The decline in the proportion entering tenure-track careers occurred alongside a substantial expansion in doctoral education in the United States; the NSF reports a long-term upward trend in the number of research doctorates awarded since 1958, averaging 3.0% annual growth.

They continue their studies or carry out research and further increase expertise in a specialist subject, including integrating a team and acquiring novel skills and research methods. Postdoctoral research is often considered essential while advancing the scholarly mission of the host institution; it is expected to produce relevant publications in peer-reviewed academic journals or conferences. In some countries, postdoctoral research may lead to further formal qualifications or certification, while in other countries, it does not.

Postdoctoral research may be funded through an appointment with a salary or an appointment with a stipend or sponsorship award. Appointments for such a research position may be called postdoctoral research fellow, postdoctoral research associate, or postdoctoral research assistant. Postdoctoral researchers typically work under the supervision of a principal investigator. In many English-speaking countries, postdoctoral researchers are colloquially referred to as "postdocs".

== Job security in academia ==
Due to the nature of their work in some fields, and an oversupply of graduating PhD students in many fields, some postdoctoral researchers in certain countries face an uncertain future in academia, and a large proportion will not gain tenure or a coveted faculty position in their chosen field of research.

A study on the topic was conducted in collaboration between Virginia Tech and MIT in 2018. The authors found that only about 17% of postdocs ultimately land tenure-track positions. In the 1970s the number of bioscience postdocs who proceed to acquire tenure-track positions was 50%, illustrating a significant shift in the job market.

As of 2022, however, and the broad shifts in the labor market in response to the COVID-19 pandemic, postdoc positions in at least some fields are going unfilled due to a lack of applicants.

== United Kingdom ==
In the United Kingdom in 2003, 25% of PhD graduates in the natural sciences continued to undertake post-doctoral research. Since the landmark ruling in the employment tribunal (Scotland) Ball vs Aberdeen University 2008 case (S/101486/08), researchers who have held successive fixed-term contracts for four years' service are no longer temporary employees but are entitled to open-ended contracts.

== United States ==
In the US, a postdoctoral scholar is an individual holding a doctoral degree who is engaged in mentored research or scholarly training for the purpose of acquiring the professional skills needed to pursue a career path of his or her choosing. Postdoctoral researchers play an important role in spearheading postgraduate research activity in the US. The median salary of postdoctoral researchers one to five years after receiving their doctoral degrees is $42,000, 44% less than the $75,000 average for tenured positions. The National Postdoctoral Association (NPA) and Boston Postdoctoral Association (BPDA) are nonprofit organizations that advocate for postdoctoral scholars in the United States.

Postdoctoral research may be required for obtaining a tenure-track faculty position, especially at research-oriented institutions. Post-doctoral appointments that were traditionally optional have become mandatory in some fields as the degree of competition for tenure-track positions in academia has significantly increased over previous decades. In fact, the small supply of the professional positions in academia compared to the growing number of postdoctoral researchers makes it difficult to find tenure-track positions. In 2008, the proportion of postdoctoral researchers who got a tenure or tenure-track position within 5 years after they received a doctoral degree was about 39%; nearly 10% of postdoctoral researchers were over 40 years old in 2003.

On the other hand, 85 percent of engineering doctoral degree holders are likely to initially go into business or the industry sector. Under the circumstances, providing doctoral students as well as postdoctoral researchers with necessary skills for nonacademic positions has become one of the important roles for graduate schools and institutions. The America COMPETES Act recognized the importance of graduate student support for obtaining skills needed when they pursue nonacademic careers, and required National Science Foundation (NSF) to increase or decrease funding for the Integrative Graduate Education and Research Traineeship (IGERT) programs at least at the same rate as it increases or decreases funding for the Graduate Research Fellowship. There are no comprehensive data of international postdoctoral researchers in the US because of the less-organized survey and the difficulty in counting international postdoctoral researchers. The proportion of postdoctoral researchers on temporary visas reached 53.6% in 2010. The life sciences hold the largest percentage of postdoctoral researchers on temporary visas; in 2008, approximately 56% of postdoctoral researchers in the life sciences were temporary residents. Of these postdoctoral researchers on temporary visas, four out of five earned their PhD outside of the United States. There exists fear that foreign PhD's are taking postdoctoral research positions from American researchers. The influx of foreign PhD's has influenced the supply of ready-researchers, and thereby, the wages. One estimate claims that a 10% increase in the supply of foreign postdoctoral researchers lower the position salary by 3 to 4%.

In the US, life sciences have a greater share than other fields due to higher federal funding of life and medical science areas since the mid 1990s. One survey shows that 54% of postdoctoral researchers major in life sciences, whereas those who majored in physical science, mathematics, and engineering account for 28%.

In 2010, postdoctoral researchers in California formed a union, UAW Local 5810 in order to secure better working conditions such as the right to file a complaint for alleged discrimination or sexual harassment through a formal grievance procedure. In California, new postdoctoral appointments receive at least the NIH postdoctoral minimum salary ($50,004 in 2019) and many receive annual pay raises of 5% to 7% or more in accordance with the NIH's Ruth L. Kirschstein National Research Service Awards (NRSA).

In 2014, postdoctoral researchers in Boston organized the "Future of Research" Symposium to respond to a conversation about the state of biomedical research from the perspective of junior scientists. The meeting included panel discussions with academics concerned about the scientific enterprise, a video message from Massachusetts senator Elizabeth Warren, and workshops discussing training, funding, the structure of the biomedical workforce, and metrics and incentives in science which were used to generate recommendations in a white paper. Meetings organized by postdoctoral researchers in 2015 spread to New York University (NYU), Chicago and San Francisco and a second meeting in Boston discussed data collection, labor economics and evidence-based policy to advocate for changes to science, including the future of the PhD.

== India ==
Most of India's premier engineering, science and management institutes offer postdoctoral fellowships. The Indian Council of Social Science Research also offers fellowships for pursuing a postdoctoral degree.

== Australia ==
Salaried appointments at the minimum Level A, Step 6 for academic salaries, for doctoral qualified employees (beginning in 2008) are set at A$75,612 p.a. at the University of Sydney, A$75,404 p.a. at the University of Melbourne, and A$75,612 p.a. at the University of New South Wales.

Alternatively the Australian Research Council (ARC) provides Postdoctoral Fellowships. For example, their Discovery Projects, funds 3 year Fellowships, beginning in 2009, with A$61,399 p.a. Furthermore, a mandatory superannuation payment of 11–17% is paid by Universities.

== China ==
The postdoctoral system in China was founded in 1985 upon suggestion by Chinese American physicist and Nobel laureate Tsung-Dao Lee. The Office of the National Administrative Committee of Postdoctoral Researchers (Chinese: 全国博士后管理委员会办公室) regulates all postdoctoral mobile stations (Chinese: 博士后科研流动站) at universities and postdoctoral work stations (Chinese: 博士后科研工作站) at institutes and enterprises in mainland China. Applicants to postdoctoral positions have to pass a detailed medical check-up in order to enter the stations (Chinese: 进站). Postdoctoral researchers are required to undergo regular evaluations, and submit a research report for evaluation at the end of the postdoctoral period to obtain approval to leave the stations (Chinese: 出站). Those who are approved to leave the stations will receive a postdoctoral certificate from the national administration office. In some universities, postdoctoral researchers who fail to leave their stations normally, either due to failing their evaluations or early withdrawal from the stations (Chinese: 退站), may be asked to pay back the grants or even the salaries that they have received. Because of the way that the postdoctoral system is managed, postdoctoral research is widely mistaken to be an academic degree in China. The government's administration of the postdoctoral system has been criticized for hindering innovative research, as too much effort is spent on evaluations, and overemphasis on performance prevents the creation of a relaxing research environment.

== Latin America ==
In some Latin American countries, there is a degree called "Posdoctorado" (Postdoctoral degree) that is a kind of postdoctoral structured studies, plus research. Depending on the country, it may also be known as "Diploma de Posdoctorado" (Postdoctoral diploma), "Título de Posdoctorado" (Postdoctoral Title) or just "Posdoctorado" (Postdoctorate).

== See also ==
- Postdoctoral researcher unionization
- Postgraduate education
