= National Postdoctoral Association =

American nonprofit educational organization

The National Postdoctoral Association (NPA) is a nonprofit, 501(c)3 educational organization in the United States that is dedicated to enhancing the quality of the postdoctoral experience for all participants. Since its founding in 2003, more than 200 institutions have adopted portions of the NPA's Recommended Postdoctoral Policies and Practices. Today, the NPA has 240 organizational members, whose research efforts are supported by 70,000 postdocs.

Headquartered in Rockville, MD, the NPA is supported by members, volunteers, key partners, and grants from government agencies and private foundations.

== History ==
The NPA was established in 2003 with the goal of facilitating improvements for postdoctoral researchers in the United States. At the time of its founding, there was no national organization with the primary aim of improving the American postdoctoral experience. The NPA has worked collaboratively with research institutions, postdoctoral affairs offices (PDOs), postdoctoral associations (PDAs), professional organizations, and scientific funding agencies. The NPA has sought especially to encourage the creation of additional PDOs and PDAs.

=== Founding members ===
A steering committee composed of postdoctoral representatives from across the country initiated the formation of the NPA. The committee coalesced in April 2002 during Science's NextWave Postdoc Network meeting held in Washington D.C. At this meeting, attendees expressed broad support for a national organization that would provide focus and affect positive change for postdocs. In January 2003, the NPA was officially formed.

The founding members of the NPA include:

- Orfeu M. Buxton – University of Chicago, Chicago, Illinois
- Karen Christopherson – Stanford Medical School, Stanford, California
- Raymond Clark – University of California, La Jolla, California
- Carol L. Manahan – Johns Hopkins School of Medicine, Baltimore, Maryland
- Arti Patel – National Cancer Institute/NIH, Bethesda, Maryland
- Avi Spier – The Scripps Research Institute, La Jolla, California
- Claudina Aleman Stevenson – National Cancer Institute/NIH, Bethesda, Maryland

== Mission ==
The NPA’s mission is to improve the postdoctoral experience by supporting a culture of inclusive connection. At the individual, organizational, and national levels, the NPA facilitates enhanced professional growth, raises awareness, and collaborates with stakeholders in the postdoctoral community.

== Organization ==
NPA activities are coordinated by professional staff members responsible for the day-to-day operations of the organization and strategic implementation of resources. Headquartered in Rockville, MD, the NPA is supported by members, volunteers, key partners, and grants from government agencies and private foundations.

=== Leadership ===
Since 2020, the organization’s executive director & CEO is Thomas P. Kimbis. The NPA maintains a 14-member elected Board of Directors. An Advisory Council reports to the Board and provides an additional resource for guidance and support to the Board and Executive Director & CEO. In 2022, a Postdoc Council was established to elevate the voice and input of postdocs in the implementation of initiatives by the NPA.

=== Membership ===
There are three types of NPA membership: Organizational Member, Affiliate Member, and Full Individual Member. Organizations can obtain an Organizational membership that serves as a conduit for complimentary Affiliate membership to that organization’s graduate students, postdocs, staff, and faculty. Any individual may join the NPA under the Full Individual membership category.

=== Committees of the membership ===
These committees/task forces are run by volunteers and are open to anyone interested in improving the postdoctoral experience.

Advocacy Committee: Addresses advocacy and policy issues affecting the postdoctoral community.

Meetings Committee: Plans and coordinates NPA-sponsored meetings. The main tasks revolve around the Annual Conference, including development of agendas, logistical arrangements, marketing and fundraising activities, and conducting post-meeting evaluations.

Outreach Committee: Conducts outreach activities to promote the mission of the NPA.

Resource Development Committee: Develops and maintains tools and resources for use by the postdoctoral community.

POSTDOCket Committee: Responsible for composing, editing, and publishing The POSTDOCKet, the quarterly publication of the NPA.

Diversity Officers: The Diversity Officers provide leadership on diversity issues and bring together postdocs and their allies in order to develop new resources, track information, promote dialogue, and effect change for underrepresented groups.

International Officers: The International Officers serve as the public face of international postdoc issues for the NPA.

=== Governance committees ===
Governance committees are generally populated by the members of the Board of Directors, although members of the NPA Advisory Council may be invited to serve if their skill set matches the agenda of the committee.

- Development
- Finance
- Oversight
- Strategic Planning

== Program activities ==
The NPA’s program activities are focused in three key areas:

=== Advocacy ===
The association advocates for policy change within research institutions that host postdoctoral scholars. Since the association’s founding, more than 200 institutions have adopted portions of the NPA’s Recommended Policies and Practices. The NPA continues to work with the leadership of federal funding agencies, such as the National Institutes of Health (NIH) and the National Science Foundation (NSF), to develop new programs and policies for postdoctoral training, compensation, and benefits. The NPA values its partners in advocacy, including prominent national associations and organizations that represent the scientific, research, and higher education communities.

=== Community-building ===
The NPA hosts an annual conference to provide opportunities for the postdoctoral community to gather and share best practices. The association also maintains a Web site with a members-only community to facilitate networking nationwide.

=== Resource development ===
The NPA continues to provide the tools and resources that postdocs and administrators need for success. Most NPA publications are available online, with selected resources for members only. These include: an International Postdoc Survival Guide, toolkits for postdoc associations & offices, an institutional policy database and subsequent reports, and the NPA’s Core Competencies.

== Events ==
=== Annual Conference ===
Ever since its birth, the NPA convenes once a year for a conference that focuses on postdoc activities (e.g., career development, training standard, advocacy, etc.). The conference locations alternate across the United States, and spans two days. The event includes a poster session, and concurrent workshops that cover topics of interests for postdocs, as well as keynote speakers.

=== National Postdoc Appreciation Week ===
Since 2009, the NPA has hosted National Postdoc Appreciation Week (NPAW), a celebration to highlight the contributions postdocs make to U.S. research and discovery. Recognized formally by the U.S. House of Representatives, NPAW takes place during the third full week of September each year. Institutions and universities around the world participate in that event through major networking activities, including social events, seminars, and more. Although postdoc training is considered a temporary position, postdocs are a vital part of the research body, and contribute a major portion of publications and grants. This event includes not only postdocs, but also graduate students and faculty members, friends and family.

September 24, 2009 marked the NPA's first ever “National Postdoc Appreciation Day.” 70 institutions across 27 states hosted celebrations, and there were events held in Canada and Australia. The Appreciation Day was organized to recognize the contribution that postdocs make to research every day across the country. Events were organized at institutions ranging from universities and research institutes, to the NIH. Events ran the gamut from ice cream socials, to BBQs and happy hours. Many institutions also used the day as an opportunity to hold career seminars, mini research symposia and presentations about maximizing the postdoctoral experience.

== Recognition ==
- "Academic employers seek research experience and teaching skills"
- "Postdoc survey confirms widespread dissatisfaction among US researchers"
- "Funding source shouldn't affect postdoc benefits"

== See also ==
- Postdoctoral Researcher
- The National Academies
- American Association for the Advancement of Science
- National Institutes of Health
- National Science Foundation
