= List of timelines =

This is a list of timelines currently on Wikipedia.

== Overview ==
There are several types of timeline articles.

- Timelines by topic show the significant historical events and developments for a specific topic, over the course of centuries or millennia.
- Graphical timelines provide a visual representation for the timespan of multiple events that have a particular duration, over the course of centuries or millennia.
- Timelines by year are timelines for one particular year that show the developments for that year within the topical area of that timeline.
- Lists of years or Tables of years are indexes that list all of the individual timelines by year that pertain to a specific topic.

Timespans next to the timeline articles listed here include the date of the earliest item included in the linked timeline article.

== Types ==
- Living graph
- Logarithmic timeline
- Log file
- Synchronoptic view
- Interactive timeline (video games, interactive websites, interactive media, simulations, virtual reality, augmented reality)

== General ==
- Chronology of the universe
- Timeline of Nature
- Timeline of cosmological epochs (13,8 billion years – present)
- List of time periods
- List of decades, centuries, and millennia
- 3rd millennium (expected future events)
- List of years
  - 2026

=== Prehistory ===
- Timeline of the early universe – events dating from the formation of the universe
- Timelines from the formation of the Earth to the rise of modern humans
  - Timeline of natural history (13,7 billion years – 200,000 years)
    - Timeline of the evolutionary history of life (4,3 billion years - present)
      - Timeline of human evolution (4,3 billion years – 350,000 years)
  - Timeline of animals (890 million years - present)
- Timeline of human prehistory (350,000 years – 3400 BCE)

=== History ===
- Timeline of Philippine sovereignty
- Timeline of South Asian history
- Timeline of the Russo-Japanese War
- Timeline of the Russian Revolution of 1905
- Timeline of the Greek genocide
- Timeline of the Chinese Civil War

==== History, chronologically ====
- Timelines of Big History
- Timeline of pre-Columbian trans-oceanic contact (47,000 BCE–1492 CE)
- Timeline of environmental history (15,000 BCE – present)
- Timeline of country and capital changes (3850 BCE – present)
- Timeline of ancient history (3500 BCE – 500 CE)
  - Timeline of ancient Greek mathematicians (700 BCE – 600 CE)
  - Timeline of ancient Romania (3900 BCE – 400 CE)
  - Timeline of ancient Greece (800 BCE – 1 CE)
  - Timeline of Roman history (754 BCE - 1453 CE)
- Timeline of LGBT history (25th century BCE – present)
  - Timeline of LGBTQ history in Manchester
  - Timeline of LGBTQ history in New York City
  - Timeline of LGBTQ history in Bangladesh
  - Timeline of LGBTQ history in Botswana
  - Timeline of LGBTQ history in Chile
  - Timeline of LGBTQ history in the Dominican Republic
  - Timeline of LGBTQ history in Equatorial Guinea
  - Timeline of LGBTQ history in Fiji
  - Timeline of LGBTQ history in Germany
  - Timeline of LGBTQ history in Lesotho
  - Timeline of LGBTQ history in Namibia
  - Timeline of LGBTQ history in Palestine
  - Timeline of LGBTQ history in Panama
  - Timeline of LGBTQ history in Romania
  - Timeline of LGBTQ history in Rwanda
  - Timeline of LGBTQ history in Senegal
  - Timeline of LGBTQ history in South Africa
  - Timeline of Asian and Pacific Islander diasporic LGBTQ history
  - Timeline of South Asian and diasporic LGBTQ history
  - Timeline of Brigham Young University LGBTQ history
  - List of lesbian, gay, bisexual, or transgender firsts by year (1867 – present)
  - Timeline of same-sex marriage (1970 CE–present)
- Chronology of European exploration of Asia (330 BCE–1595 CE)
- Timeline of the Middle Ages (410 CE – 1499)
- Chronology of colonialism (821–2010)
  - Chronology of the colonization of North America (986–1791)
    - Timeline of Colonial America (30000 BCE - 1783)
- Abolition of slavery timeline (1102 CE–present)
- Timeline of European exploration (1418 – present)
- Timeline of European imperialism (1402–1919)
- Timelines of modern history (1500 CE – present)
  - Timeline of early modern history (1500 CE – 1899)
    - Timeline of African-American history
    - Timeline of African-American firsts
    - Timeline of the Salem witch trials (1688–1713)
    - List of African-American firsts (1738–present)
    - Timeline of the Lewis and Clark Expedition (1803–1807)
  - Timeline of modern American conservatism (1939 – present)
  - Timeline of the open-access movement (1942 – present)
  - Timeline of 1960s counterculture (1950 – 1980)
  - Timeline of events following World War II
  - Timeline of geopolitical changes
  - 2026
- Timeline of the far future (3001 CE – $10^{10^{10^{56}}}$)

==== Women in history ====
- List of American women's firsts (1635–present)
- List of women's firsts
- Timeline of feminism in the United States
- Timeline of first-wave feminism
- Timeline of second-wave feminism
- Timeline of third-wave feminism
- Timeline of fourth-wave feminism
- Timeline of women hazzans
- Timeline of women hazzans in the United States
- Timeline of women in aviation
- Timeline of women in Denmark
- Timeline of women in geology
- Timeline of women in library science
- Timeline of women in mathematics
- Timeline of women in religion
- Timeline of women in religion in the United States
- Timeline of women in science
- Timeline of women in science in the United States
- Timeline of women in the United States (1756 CE – present)
- Timeline of American women in war and the U.S. military from 1945 to 1999
- Timeline of female MPs in the House of Commons of the United Kingdom
- Timeline of women in war in the United States, Pre-1945
- Timeline of women in warfare in Colonial America
- Timeline of women in warfare in the United States before 1900
- Timeline of women in warfare in the United States from 1900 to 1949
- Timeline of women lawyers
- Timeline of women's legal rights in the United States (other than voting)
- Timeline of women's suffrage
  - Timeline of women's suffrage in Alabama
  - Timeline of women's suffrage in Alaska
  - Timeline of women's suffrage in Arkansas
  - Timeline of women's suffrage in California
  - Timeline of women's suffrage in Delaware
  - Timeline of women's suffrage in Florida
  - Timeline of women's suffrage in Georgia (U.S. state)
  - Timeline of women's suffrage in Hawaii
  - Timeline of women's suffrage in Illinois
  - Timeline of women's suffrage in Maine
  - Timeline of women's suffrage in Missouri
  - Timeline of women's suffrage in Montana
  - Timeline of women's suffrage in Nevada
  - Timeline of women's suffrage in New Mexico
  - Timeline of women's suffrage in Ohio
  - Timeline of women's suffrage in Rhode Island
  - Timeline of women's suffrage in Texas
  - Timeline of women's suffrage in Utah
  - Timeline of women's suffrage in Virginia
  - Timeline of women's suffrage in Wisconsin

== Arts ==
- Timeline of art (prehistoric – present)
- Timeline of Art Nouveau
- Timeline of architecture (8000 BCE – present)
- Timeline of architectural styles (6000 BCE – present)
- Timeline of Native American art history (10,200 BCE – present)
- Timeline of 20th-century printmaking in America
- Timeline of African American children's literature
- Australian feminist art timeline
- The Beatles timeline
- Chronology of works by Caravaggio
- Timeline of early Estonian publications
- Timeline of electronic music genres
- Timeline for invention in the arts
- Timeline of Italian music
- Timeline of Japanese music
- Timeline of jazz education
- List of years in literature (2400 BCE – present)
  - 2026 in literature
- Timeline of music in Manchester
- Timeline of music in the United States
- Timeline of music technology
- Timeline of musical events
- Timeline of progressive rock
- Timeline of punk rock
- Timeline of the feminist art movement in New Zealand
- Timeline of trends in Australian music
- Timeline of twentieth-century theatre
- Chronology of Shakespeare's plays (1589–1614)

== Important Events in History ==
- The moon Landing (1969)
- Fall of the Berlin Wall (1989)
- Signing of the United States Declaration of Independence (1776)
- The invention of the Internet (1983-1991)
- The End of World War II (1945)
- The First Human in Space (1961)
- Dissolution of the Soviet Union (1991)

== Contemporary culture ==
=== Entertainment ===
- Chronology of console role-playing games (1973–present)
- Timeline of fictional stories about the Mona Lisa
- Timeline of fictional stories set in Vatican City
- List of years in film (1875–present)
  - 2026 in film
- List of musical events (20th century BCE – present)
- List of years in television (1900–present)
  - 2026 in television
- Timeline of the BBC (1922–present)

=== Comic books ===
- Timeline of DC Comics (1934 – present)
- Timeline of DC Comics (1930s)
- Timeline of DC Comics (1950s)
- List of comic book supervillain debuts (1939 – present)
- List of Marvel Comics first appearances (1939 – present)
- List of Marvel Comics superhero debuts (1939 – present)
- Publication history of DC Comics crossover events (1961 – present)
- Publication history of Marvel Comics crossover events (1984 – present)
- List of superhero debuts (1902 – present)
- Timeline of Marvel Comics

== Crime ==
- Timeline of crimes involving the Order of Nine Angles
- Timeline of gang-related events in Haiti
- List of assassinated people
- Timeline of organized crime (1880–present)
- Timeline of organized crime in Chicago
- Timeline of piracy (1680–present)
- List of riots (121 BCE – present)
- Timeline of Rob Ford video scandal (2013–2016)
- Timeline of the Infighting in the Sinaloa Cartel
- Timeline of the killing of Trayvon Martin

== Disasters ==
- List of historic fires (356 BCE – present)
- List of epidemics
- Lists of nuclear disasters and radioactive incidents
- Timeline of relief efforts after the 2010 Chile earthquake
- Timeline of relief efforts after the 2010 Haiti earthquake
- Timeline of the Canterbury earthquakes

== Economics ==
- Chronology of world oil market events (1970–2003)
- Timeline of General Electric
- World oil market chronology from 2003 (2003–present)
- 2003 world oil market chronology (2003)
- Timeline of banking in Western Australia
- Timeline of Brazilian economic stabilization plans (1989–1994)
- Timeline of international trade
- Timeline of largest projects in the Russian economy
- Nike timeline
- Parmalat bankruptcy timeline
- Subprime crisis impact timeline
- Timeline of the Great Recession
- Timeline of the National Land Company
- Timeline of the News Corporation scandal
- Facebook timeline

== Environment ==
General

- Timeline of Animal Liberation Front actions
- Timeline of animal welfare and rights
- Timeline of animal welfare and rights in Europe
- Timeline of animal welfare and rights in the United States
- Lists of earthquakes by period
- Timeline of environmental history (15,000 BCE – present)
- Timeline of events related to per- and polyfluoroalkyl substances
- Timeline of Extinction Rebellion actions
- Timeline of history of environmentalism (630s – present)
- Timeline of major U.S. environmental and occupational health regulation
- Timeline of the New Zealand environment (10th century CE – present)
- List of years in the environment and environmental sciences (1927 – present)

Weather and environmental disasters

- Selected timeline related to orphan wells in Alberta
- List of tornado events by year
- List of wildfires

Life

- Timeline of the evolutionary history of life
- List of years in birding and ornithology
- List of years in paleontology (17th century – present)
  - 2026 in paleontology

== Fictional timelines of history ==
- Timeline of Star Trek – multimedia science fiction series.

== Peoples, nations, cultures and geographical ==
- Timeline of food
- Chronology of colonialism (1415 – present)
- Timeline of country and capital changes
- Timeline of maritime migration and exploration
- Timeline of the European migrant crisis

=== Ancient civilizations ===
- Chronology of the ancient Near East (Ancient Orient including Babylonia and Assyria)
- Conventional Egyptian chronology (3200 BCE – 525 BCE)
- Egyptian chronology
- Timeline of Hispania
- History of ancient Israel and Judah (1700 BCE – 200 BCE)
- Kings of Rome (prior to the establishment of the Roman Republic) (753 BCE – 510 BCE)
- List of Roman consuls
- Mesoamerican chronology
- Timeline of the Mongol Empire
- Seljuk Rulers (1037 CE – 1194)
- Timeline of ancient Greece (800 BCE – 1 CE)
- Timeline of ancient Mesopotamia
- Timeline of Champa
- Timeline of Chacoan history
- Timeline of Roman history (754 BCE – 1453 CE)
- Timeline of prehistoric Scotland (10,800 BCE – 1 BCE)
- Timeline of the Three Kingdoms period (184 CE – 251)

=== Extant civilizations ===
==== Supranational entities and regions, peoples ====
- Timeline of Amazon history
- Timeline of Artsakh history
- Timeline of British history
- Timeline of Cherokee history
- Timeline of the demographics of Palestine (region)
- Timeline of European Union history
- Timeline of Faroese history
- Timeline of Greenland
- Timeline of Igbo history
- Timeline of Jewish history
- Timeline of the Karavas
- Timeline of Middle Eastern history
- Timeline of the Palestine region
- Timeline of Serer history

==== Sovereign states ====
- Timeline of Afghan history
- Timeline of Albanian history
- Timeline of Algerian history
- Timeline of Antiguan and Barbudan history
- Timeline of Argentine history
- Timeline of Armenian history
- Timeline of Australian history
- Timeline of Austrian history
- Timeline of Bangladeshi history
- Timeline of Barbadian history
- Timeline of Belgian history
- Timeline of Bhutanese history
- Timeline of Botswana
- Timeline of Brazilian history
- Timeline of British history
- Timeline of Bulgarian history
- Timeline of Burmese history
- Timeline of Burundian history
- Timeline of Cambodian history
- Timeline of Canadian history
- Timeline of Chilean history
- Timeline of Chinese history
- Timeline of Croatian history
- Timeline of Cuban history
- Timeline of Cypriot history
- Timeline of Danish history
- Timeline of Dutch history
- Timeline of East Timorese history
- Timeline of English history
- Timeline of Estonian history
- Timeline of Fijian history
- Timeline of Finnish history
- Timeline of French history
- Timeline of Georgian History
- Timeline of German history
- Timeline of Ghanaian history
- Timeline of modern Greek history
- Timeline of Haitian history
- Timeline of Hungarian history
- Timeline of Icelandic history
- Timeline of Indian history
- Timeline of Indonesian history
- Timeline of Irish history
- Timeline of Israeli history
- Timeline of Italian history
- Timeline of Japanese history
- Timeline of Korean history
- Timeline of Latvian history
- Timeline of Lebanese history
- Timeline of Malaysian history
- Timeline of Maltese history
- Timeline of Mexican history
- Timeline of Mongolian history
- Timeline of Nepalese history
- Timeline of New Zealand history
- Timeline of Nigerian history
- Timeline of the history of North Macedonia
- Timeline of Pakistani history
- Timeline of Paraguayan history
- Timeline of Peruvian history
- Timeline of Philippine history
- Timeline of Polish history
- Timeline of Portuguese history
- Timeline of Romanian history
- Timeline of Russian history
- Timeline of Rwandan history
- Timeline of Scottish history
- Timeline of Serbian history
- Timeline of Singaporean history
- Timeline of Slovenian history
- Timeline of South African history
- Timeline of Spanish history
- Timeline of Swedish history
- Timeline of Swiss history
- Timeline of Syrian history
- Timeline of Taiwanese history
- Timeline of Tajikistani history
- Timeline of Tanzanian history
- Timeline of Thai history
- Timeline of Tongan history
- Timeline of Turkish history
- Timeline of United States history
- Timeline of Vietnamese history
- Timeline of Welsh history
- Timeline of Yemeni history

==== Subnational regions and cities, narrow timelines ====
- Angola
  - Timeline of Benguela
- Argentina
  - Timeline of Buenos Aires
- Australia
  - Timeline of Aboriginal history of Western Australia
  - Timeline of Adelaide history
  - Timeline of Brisbane
  - Timeline of Geelong history
  - Timeline of Gold Coast, Queensland
  - Goldfields–Esperance historical timeline
  - Kimberley historical timeline
  - Timeline of Melbourne history
  - Pilbara historical timeline
  - Timeline of South Australian history
  - Timeline of Sydney
- Azerbaijan
  - Timeline of Baku
- Bangladesh
  - Timeline of Dhaka
- Belgium
  - Timeline of Antwerp
  - Timeline of Bruges
- Bosnia
  - Timeline of Sarajevo
- Brazil
  - Timeline of Amazon history
  - Timeline of Belém
  - Timeline of Brasília
  - Timeline of Curitiba
  - Timeline of Fortaleza
  - Timeline of Manaus
  - Timeline of Recife
  - Timeline of Rio de Janeiro
  - Timeline of Salvador
  - Timeline of São Paulo
- Burundi
  - Timeline of Bujumbura
- Canada
  - Timeline of Alberta history
  - Timeline of Calgary history
  - Timeline of Halifax, Nova Scotia history
  - Timeline of events in Hamilton, Ontario
  - Timeline of First Nations history
  - Timeline of Moncton history
  - Timeline of Montreal history
  - Timeline of Ottawa history
  - Timeline of Port Dover, Ontario history
  - Timeline of prime ministers of Canada
  - Timeline of Quebec history
  - Timeline of Quebec City history
  - Timeline of Regina history
  - Timeline of St. John's history
  - Timeline of Toronto history
  - Timeline of Vancouver history
  - Timeline of Winnipeg history
  - Timeline of Yellowknife history
- Central African Republic
  - Timeline of Bangui
- Chile
  - Timeline of Santiago de Chile
- China
  - Timeline of Hong Kong history
  - Timeline of Republic of China history
- Colombia
  - Timeline of Bogotá
- Côte d'Ivoire
  - Timeline of Abidjan
- Cuba
  - Timeline of Guantánamo
  - Timeline of Guantánamo Bay
- Czech Republic
  - Timeline of Brno
- Denmark
  - Timeline of Aarhus
- Democratic Republic of the Congo
  - Timeline of Bukavu
- Egypt
  - Timeline of Alexandria
  - Timeline of Cairo
- England
  - Timeline of Barrow-in-Furness
  - Timeline of Birmingham history
  - Timeline of Bradford
  - Timeline of Bristol
  - Timeline of Cheshire history
  - Timeline of Liverpool
  - Timeline of London
  - Timeline of Northumbria and Northumberland
  - Timeline of Sheffield history
  - Timeline of York
- Eritrea
  - Timeline of Asmara
- Ethiopia
  - Timeline of Addis Ababa
- France
  - Timeline of Aix-en-Provence
  - Timeline of Amiens
  - Timeline of Angers
  - Timeline of Besançon
  - Timeline of Bordeaux
  - Timeline of Bourges
  - Timeline of Brest, France
- Germany
  - Timeline of Aachen
  - Timeline of Augsburg
  - Timeline of Berlin
  - Timeline of Bonn
  - Timeline of Braunschweig
  - Timeline of Bremen
  - Timeline of Chemnitz
  - Timeline of Cologne
  - Timeline of Dortmund
  - Timeline of Dresden
  - Timeline of Duisburg
  - Timeline of Düsseldorf
  - Timeline of Erfurt
  - Timeline of Essen
  - Timeline of Frankfurt
  - Timeline of Halle (Saale)
  - Timeline of Hamburg
  - Timeline of Hanover
  - Timeline of Kassel
  - Timeline of Koblenz
  - Timeline of Leipzig
  - Timeline of Lübeck
  - Timeline of Magdeburg
  - Timeline of Mainz
  - Timeline of Mannheim
  - Timeline of Munich
  - Timeline of Münster
  - Timeline of Nuremberg
  - Timeline of Rostock
  - Timeline of Stuttgart
  - Weimar Timeline
  - Timeline of Würzburg
- Ghana
  - Timeline of Accra
- Guinea-Bissau
  - Timeline of Bissau
- Hungary
  - Timeline of Budapest
- India
  - Timeline of Ahmedabad
  - Timeline of history of Assam
  - Timeline of Bihar
  - Timeline of Goan history
  - Chronology of Tamil history
  - Timeline of Karnataka
  - Timeline of Maharashtra history
  - Timeline of history of Rajasthan
- Indonesia
  - Timeline of Jakarta
- Iran
  - Timeline of Bandar Abbas
- Iraq
  - Timeline of Baghdad
  - Timeline of Basra
- Ireland
  - Timeline of Dublin
- Israel
  - Timeline of Haifa
  - Timeline of Jaffa
  - Timeline of Jerusalem
  - Timeline of Tel Aviv
- Italy
  - Timeline of Ancona
  - Timeline of Arezzo
  - Timeline of Bari
  - Timeline of Bergamo
  - Timeline of Bologna
  - Timeline of Bolzano
  - Timeline of Brescia
  - Timeline of Brindisi
- Jordan
  - Timeline of Amman
- Kazakhstan
  - Timeline of Almaty
- Kyrgyzstan
  - Timeline of Bishkek
- Lebanon
  - Timeline of Beirut
- Libya
  - Timeline of Benghazi
- Madagascar
  - Timeline of Antananarivo
- Mali
  - Timeline of Bamako
- Mexico
  - Timeline of Acapulco
  - Timeline of Aguascalientes City
- Mozambique
  - Timeline of Beira, Mozambique
- Philippines
  - Timeline of Manila
- Nepal
  - Timeline of Mount Everest expeditions
- Netherlands
  - Timeline of Breda
- New Zealand
  - Timeline of Auckland
  - Timeline of New Zealand's links with Antarctica
- Northern Ireland
  - Timeline of Belfast history
- Norway
  - Timeline of Bergen
- Pakistan
  - Timeline of Pakistani history (1947–present)
- Poland
  - Timeline of Białystok
  - Timeline of Bydgoszcz
- Portugal
  - Timeline of Braga
- Puerto Rico (United States)
  - Timeline of Bayamón, Puerto Rico
- Republic of the Congo
  - Timeline of Brazzaville
- Romania
  - Timeline of Bucharest
- Russia
  - Timeline of Barnaul
  - Timeline of Berdsk
  - Timeline of Kazan
  - Timeline of Moscow
  - Timeline of Novosibirsk
  - Timeline of Omsk
  - Timeline of Pskov
  - Timeline of Saint Petersburg
- Scotland
  - Timeline of Dundee history
  - Timeline of Edinburgh history
  - Timeline of Glasgow history
- Serbia
  - Timeline of Belgrade
- Slovakia
  - Timeline of Bratislava
- Spain
  - Timeline of A Coruña
  - Timeline of Alicante
  - Timeline of Almería
  - Timeline of Badajoz
  - Timeline of Barcelona
  - Timeline of Bilbao
  - Timeline of Burgos
  - Timeline of Catalan history
  - Timeline of Galician history
- Sweden
  - Timeline of Stockholm history
- Switzerland
  - Timeline of Basel
  - Timeline of Bern
- Turkey
  - Timeline of Ankara
  - Timeline of Bursa
  - Timeline of Istanbul
  - Timeline of İzmir
- Ukraine
  - Timeline of Kyiv
  - Timeline of Kharkiv
  - Timeline of Odesa
- United Arab Emirates
  - Timeline of Abu Dhabi
- United States
  - List of timelines related to California
  - Timeline of Albuquerque, New Mexico
  - Timeline of Alexandria, Virginia
  - Timeline of Amarillo, Texas
  - Timeline of Anaheim, California
  - Timeline of Arizona
  - Timeline of Arlington, Texas
  - Timeline of Asheville, North Carolina
  - Timeline of Atlanta
  - Timeline of Augusta, Georgia
  - Timeline of Aurora, Colorado
  - Timeline of Austin, Texas
  - Timeline of Bakersfield, California
  - Timeline of Baltimore
  - Timeline of Baton Rouge, Louisiana
  - Timeline of Beaumont, Texas
  - Timeline of Billings, Montana
  - Timeline of Birmingham, Alabama
  - Timeline of Boise, Idaho
  - Timeline of Boston
  - Timeline of Boulder, Colorado
  - Timeline of Briarcliff Manor
  - Timeline of Brownsville, Texas
  - Timeline of Buffalo, New York
  - Timeline of Burlington, Vermont
  - Timeline of Chicago history
  - Timeline of Colorado history
  - Timeline of Florida History
  - Timeline of Kansas history
  - Timeline of Kentucky history
  - Timeline of Largo history
  - Timeline of Michigan history
  - Timeline of pre-statehood Montana history
  - Timeline of Providence, Rhode Island
  - Timeline of South Dakota
  - Timeline of the American Old West
  - Timeline of Washington, D.C.
- Wales
  - Timeline of Cardiff history
  - Timeline of Llanelli history
- Zambia
  - Timeline of Zambia (Northern Rhodesia)
- Zimbabwe
  - Timeline of Bulawayo

== Health ==
- Timeline of cancer treatment development
- Centers for Disease Control and Prevention timeline
- Timeline of deworming
- Timeline of early HIV/AIDS cases
- Timeline of HIV/AIDS
- List of epidemics
- Timeline of Minamata disease
- Timeline of global health (18th century – present)
- Timeline of hospitals
- Timeline of psychiatry
- Timeline of the COVID-19 pandemic
- Timeline of the opioid epidemic
- Timeline of the United States Public Health Service Commissioned Corps

== Law ==
- List of judgments of the Constitutional Court of South Africa (1995–present)
- List of treaties (1283 BCE – present)
- Timeline of women's legal rights (other than voting) (1707 CE–present)
- List of United States federal legislation (1785–present)
- Lists of United States Supreme Court cases (1789–present)
- Timeline of United States diplomatic history (1776–present)
- 2006 dismissal of U.S. attorneys timeline
- Timeline of cannabis law
- Timeline of civil marriage in the United States (1830–present)
- Food and Drug Administration History and Related Legislation (1862–present)
- Timeline of psychedelic legalization and decriminalization
- Timeline of women lawyers (1869–present)
- Timeline of women lawyers in the United States (1869–present)
- Timeline of Cox Report controversy (1995–1999)
- Timeline of disability rights in Canada
- Timeline of disability rights in Japan
- Timeline of disability rights in the United Kingdom
- Timeline of disability rights in the United States
- Timeline of disability rights outside the United States

== Military ==
- List of battles (2071 BCE – present)
- List of wars (Prehistory–present)
- Military history (Prehistory–present)
- Timeline of events in the Cold War (1945–1991)
- Timeline of United Nations peacekeeping missions (1948–present)
- Timeline of United States military operations
- Timeline of aircraft carriers of the United States Navy
- Timeline of battleships of the United States Navy
- Timeline of British military aviation
- Timeline of military aviation
- History of the Arab–Israeli conflict
- Timeline of the Israeli–Palestinian conflict
- Timeline of the Iranian Islamic revolution
- Timeline of the Special Operations Executive, Section F (1941–1945)
- Women in ancient warfare (17th century BCE-4th century CE)
- Women in post-classical warfare (5th century-15th century CE)
- Women in warfare (1500-1699)
- Women in 18th-century warfare
- Timeline of women in the United States Navy
- Timeline of women in warfare in Colonial America (1754–1783)
- Timeline of women in warfare in the United States before 1900 (1800s–1898)
- Women in warfare and the military in the 19th century
- Timeline of notable women in World War I
- Timeline of women in warfare in the United States from 1900 to 1949
- Women in warfare and the military (1900–1945)
- Timeline of women in warfare in the United States from 1950 to 1999
- Women in warfare and the military (1945–1999)
- Timeline of women in warfare in the United States since 2000
- Women in warfare and the military (2000–present)

=== Military conflicts ===
- Timeline of conflict in Anglo-Saxon Britain (500-1000)
- Timeline of Kurdish uprisings (838–present)
- Timeline of the Hundred Years' War (1337–1453)
- Timeline of Māori battles (c. 1350–present)
- Timeline of Francis Drake's circumnavigation (1577–1580)
- Timeline of the Wars of the Three Kingdoms (1639–1651)
  - Timeline of the English Civil Wars (1639–1651)
  - Timeline of the Irish Confederate Wars (1641–1653)
- Timeline of the American Revolutionary War (1763–1800)
- Timeline of the French Revolution (1771–1799)
- Timeline of the Finnish War (1808–1809)
- Timeline of the War of 1812 (1812–1815)
- Timeline of the Texas Revolution (1835–1836)
- Timeline of Kentucky in the American Civil War (1861–1865)
- Timeline of the Philippine Revolution (1896–1898)
- Timeline of the Spanish–American War (1898)
- Timeline of Philippine–American War (1898–1913)
- Timeline of World War I (1914–1924)
  - Timeline of the United Kingdom home front during World War I
  - Timeline of the Gallipoli Campaign (1915–1916)
- Timeline of the Estonian War of Independence (1918–1920)
- Timeline of the Irish War of Independence (1919–1921)
- Timeline of intercommunal conflict in Mandatory Palestine (1920–1948)
- Timeline of the Irish Civil War (1922–1923)
- Timeline of the Second Italo-Abyssinian War (1928–1937)
- Timeline of World War II (1939–1945)
  - Timeline of events preceding World War II (1918–1939)
    - Events preceding World War II in Asia
    - Events preceding World War II in Europe
  - Timeline of the United Kingdom home front during World War II
  - Timeline of the invasion of Poland (1939)
  - Timeline of the Second Battle of the Atlantic (1939–1945)
  - Timeline of the Winter War (1939–1940)
  - Timeline of the Norwegian Campaign (1940)
  - Timeline of the North African Campaign (1940–1943)
  - Timeline of the Battle of France (1940)
  - Timeline of the Eastern Front of World War II (1941–1945)
  - Timeline of World War II (1939)
  - Timeline of World War II (1940)
  - Timeline of World War II (1941)
  - Timeline of World War II (1942)
  - Timeline of World War II (1943)
  - Timeline of World War II (1944)
  - Timeline of World War II (1945)
- Timeline of the Indonesian National Revolution (1945–1950)
- Timeline of the Kashmir conflict (1947–present)
- Timeline of insurgency in Northeast India (1954–present)
- Timeline of events related to the Southern Thailand insurgency (1960–present)
- Timeline of Colombian armed conflict (1962–present)
- Timeline of Bangladesh Liberation War (1971)
- Timeline of the Gulf War (1990–1991)
- Timeline of the Algerian Civil War (1991–2002)
- Timeline of the Croat–Bosniak War (1992–1994)
- Timeline of the 1993 Battle of Mogadishu (1993)
- Timeline of the Eritrean–Ethiopian War (1998–2000)
- Timeline of the insurgency in the Preševo Valley (1999–2001)
- Timeline of the War in Afghanistan (2001–2021)
- Timeline of the 2001 insurgency in Macedonia
- Timeline of the war on terror (2001–present)
- Timeline of the Iraq War (2003–2011)
- Timeline of the insurgency in Khyber Pakhtunkhwa (2007) (2004–present)
- Timeline of the 2006 Lebanon War (2006)
- Timeline of War in Somalia (2006–2009)
  - 2006 timeline of the War in Somalia
  - 2007 timeline of the War in Somalia
  - 2008 timeline of the War in Somalia
  - 2009 timeline of the Somali Civil War
- Timeline of al-Shabaab-related events
- Timeline of the Gaza War (2008–2009)
- Timeline of the 2008 South Ossetia War (2008)
- Timeline of Somali Civil War (2009–present)
  - 2009 timeline of the Somali Civil War
  - 2010 timeline of the Somali Civil War
  - 2011 timeline of the Somali Civil War
  - 2012 timeline of the Somali Civil War
  - 2013 timeline of the Somali Civil War
  - 2014 timeline of the Somali Civil War
  - 2015 timeline of the Somali Civil War
  - 2016 timeline of the Somali Civil War
  - 2017 timeline of the Somali Civil War
  - 2018 timeline of the Somali Civil War
  - 2019 timeline of the Somali Civil War
  - 2020 timeline of the Somali Civil War
  - 2021 timeline of the Somali Civil War
  - 2022 timeline of the Somali Civil War
  - 2023 timeline of the Somali Civil War
  - 2024 timeline of the Somali Civil War
  - 2025 timeline of the Somali Civil War
- Timeline of the Boko Haram insurgency (2009–present)
- Timeline of the 2011 military intervention in Libya
- Timeline of the Syrian civil war (2011–present)
- Timeline of violent events relating to the Syrian civil war spillover in Lebanon (2011–2014)
- Timeline of violent events relating to the Syrian civil war spillover in Lebanon (2014–present)
- Timeline of the Yemeni revolution (2011–2012)
- Timeline of the 2012 Gaza War
- Timeline of the Central African Republic Civil War (2012–present)
- Timeline of the war in Donbas (2014)
- Timeline of the 2014 Gaza War
- Timeline of the Libyan civil war (2014–2020)
- Timeline of the Yemeni civil war (2014–present)
- Timeline of the Battle of Mosul (2016–2017)
- Timeline of the Russo-Ukrainian war (2022–present)
- Timeline of the M23 campaign (2025)
- Timeline of the M23 campaign (2026)
- Timeline of the Gaza war (2023–)
- Timeline of the Hezbollah–Israel conflict (2023–present)
- Timelines of the Sudanese civil war (2023–present)
- Timeline of the 2026 Iran war
- Timeline of the 2026 Lebanon war

== Philosophy ==
- Timeline of philosophers
- Timeline of Eastern philosophers (Prehistory–present)
- Timeline of Western philosophers (600 BCE – 1950)
- List of years in philosophy
  - 2026 in philosophy

== Politics ==
=== General politics and government ===
- List of years in politics (16th century–present)
  - Timeline of 1980s political violence and sabotage acts in Bulgaria
  - 2026 in politics and government
- State leaders by year (3200 BCE–present)
- Timeline of the American Revolution (1763–1800)
- Timeline of chief ministers and prime ministers of England, Great Britain and the United Kingdom
- Timeline of historical geopolitical changes (~9500 BCE–present)
- Timeline of political parties in the United Kingdom (1832–present)
- Timeline of prime ministers of Great Britain and the United Kingdom
- Timeline of rival political parties
- Timeline of drafting and ratification of the United States Constitution (1785–1791)
- Timeline of Philippine political history
- Russian interference and Trump investigations
  - Timeline of Russian interference in the 2016 United States elections
  - Timeline of Russian interference in the 2016 United States elections (July 2016 – election day)
  - Timeline of post-election transition following Russian interference in the 2016 United States elections
  - Timeline of investigations into Trump and Russia (January–June 2017)
  - Timeline of investigations into Trump and Russia (July–December 2017)
  - Timeline of investigations into Trump and Russia (January–June 2018)
  - Timeline of investigations into Trump and Russia (July–December 2018)
  - Timeline of investigations into Trump and Russia (2019)
  - Timeline of investigations into Trump and Russia (2020–2021)
- Timeline of Zionism (1777–1991)

=== Elections ===
- Timeline of Australian elections
- Timeline of Canadian elections
  - Timeline of the 2004 Canadian federal election
  - Timeline of the 2006 Canadian federal election
  - Timeline of the 2015 Canadian federal election
- Timeline of events in the 2006 Liberal Democrats leadership election
- Timeline of events in the 2007 Liberal Democrats leadership election
- Timeline of the 2009 Iranian election protests
- Timeline of the 2014 Indian general election
- Timeline of the 2016 Philippine general election
- Timeline of the 2019 Indian general election
- Timeline of the 2004 United States presidential election
- Timeline of the 2008 United States presidential election
- Timeline of the 2012 United States presidential election
- Timeline of the 2016 United States presidential election
- Timeline of the 2020 United States presidential election
- Timeline of the 2024 United States presidential election
- Timeline of the 2028 United States presidential election

=== Social movements, protests, and civil rights ===
- Timeline of feminism (380 BCE–present)
- Timeline of feminism in the United States (1776–present)
- Timeline of LGBTQ journalism
- Timeline of women's suffrage (1718–present)
- Timeline of women's suffrage in the United States (1777–present)
- Timeline of Brexit
- Timeline of the 2011 Israeli social justice protests
- Timeline of the 2011–2012 Saudi Arabian protests
- Timeline of the 2014 Venezuelan protests
- Timeline of the 2019 Venezuelan protests
- Timeline of the 2019–2020 Hong Kong protests
- Timeline of the 2020 Canadian pipeline and railway protests
- Timeline of the 2020 Nicaraguan protests
- Timeline of the 2020–2021 Belarusian protests
- Timeline of the 2022–2023 Peruvian protests
- Timeline of the Canada convoy protest
- Timeline of the Gezi Park protests
- Timeline of protests in Venezuela in 2015
- Timeline of protests in Venezuela in 2016
- Timeline of protests in Venezuela in 2018
- Timeline of the People Power Revolution
- Timeline of the Saffron Revolution

=== Labour and strikes ===
- Timeline of labour in Greater Sudbury
- Timeline of labour issues and events
- Timeline of strikes in 1946
- Timeline of strikes in 1947
- Timeline of strikes in 1948
- Timeline of strikes in 1953
- Timeline of strikes in 1964
- Timeline of strikes in 1967
- Timeline of strikes in 1970
- Timeline of strikes in 1973
- Timeline of strikes in 1974
- Timeline of strikes in 1975
- Timeline of strikes in 1976
- Timeline of strikes in 1977
- Timeline of strikes in 1978
- Timeline of strikes in 1979
- Timeline of strikes in 1980
- Timeline of strikes in 1981
- Timeline of strikes in 1982
- Timeline of strikes in 1983
- Timeline of strikes in 1984
- Timeline of strikes in 1985
- Timeline of strikes in 1986
- Timeline of strikes in 1987
- Timeline of strikes in 1988
- Timeline of strikes in 1989
- Timeline of strikes in 1990
- Timeline of strikes in 1991
- Timeline of strikes in 1992
- Timeline of strikes in 1993
- Timeline of strikes in 1994
- Timeline of strikes in 1995
- Timeline of strikes in 1996
- Timeline of strikes in 1997
- Timeline of strikes in 1998
- Timeline of strikes in 1999
- Timeline of strikes in 2000
- Timeline of strikes in 2001
- Timeline of strikes in 2002
- Timeline of strikes in 2003
- Timeline of strikes in 2004
- Timeline of strikes in 2005
- Timeline of strikes in 2006
- Timeline of strikes in 2012
- Timeline of strikes in 2015
- Timeline of strikes in 2017
- Timeline of strikes in 2018
- Timeline of strikes in 2021
- Timeline of strikes in 2022
- Timeline of strikes in 2023
- Timeline of strikes in 2024
- Timeline of strikes in 2025
- Timeline of strikes in 2026

=== Presidencies and governorships ===
- Timeline of the Barack Obama presidency
  - Timeline of the presidency of Barack Obama (2009)
  - Timeline of the presidency of Barack Obama (2010)
  - Timeline of the presidency of Barack Obama (2011)
  - Timeline of the presidency of Barack Obama (2012)
  - Timeline of the presidency of Barack Obama (2013)
  - Timeline of the presidency of Barack Obama (2014)
- Timeline of the Bill Clinton presidency
- Timeline of the Calvin Coolidge presidency
- Timeline of the Donald Trump presidencies
- Timeline of the Dwight D. Eisenhower presidency
- Timeline of the Edgar Lungu presidency
- Timeline of the Ferdinand Marcos presidency
- Timeline of the Franklin D. Roosevelt presidency
- Timeline of the George H. W. Bush presidency
- Timeline of the George W. Bush presidency
- Timeline of the George Washington presidency
- Timeline of the Gerald Ford presidency
- Timeline of the Hakainde Hichilema presidency
- Timeline of the Harry S. Truman presidency
- Timeline of the Herbert Hoover presidency
- Timeline of the James Madison presidency
- Timeline of the Jimmy Carter presidency
- Timeline of the Joe Biden presidency
- Timeline of the John F. Kennedy presidency
- Timeline of the John Quincy Adams presidency
- Timeline of the Lyndon B. Johnson presidency
- Timeline of the Nyesom Wike governorship (29 May 2015–present)
- Timeline of the Richard Nixon presidency
- Timeline of the Ronald Reagan presidency
- Timeline of the Theodore Roosevelt presidency
- Timeline of the Warren G. Harding presidency
- Timeline of the William Howard Taft presidency
- Timeline of the William McKinley presidency
- Timeline of the Woodrow Wilson presidency

== Religion ==
- List of founders of religious traditions (2300 BCE – present)
- Timeline of women as Protestant bishops (1929–present)
- Timeline of women as archbishops (1934–present)
- Timeline of Chinese mythology
- Timeline of women in religion (6th century BCE – present)
- Timeline of women's ordination (6th century BCE – present)
- Timeline of women's ordination in the United States (1815 CE–present)
- Religious leaders by year (451–present)

=== Ayyavazhi ===
- Timeline of Ayyavazhi history (1809–present)

=== Buddhism ===
- Timeline of Buddhism (563 BCE – present)
- Timeline of Zen Buddhism in the United States

=== Christianity ===
- Timeline of Christianity (6 BCE – present)
- Chronology of the Bible
- Chronology of Revelation
- Book of Mormon chronology
- Mormon timeline
- Timeline of LGBTQ Mormon history
  - Timeline of LGBTQ Mormon history in the 1950s
  - Timeline of LGBTQ Mormon history in the 1960s
  - Timeline of LGBTQ Mormon history in the 1970s
  - Timeline of LGBTQ Mormon history in the 1980s
  - Timeline of LGBTQ Mormon history in the 1990s
  - Timeline of LGBTQ Mormon history in the 19th century
  - Timeline of LGBTQ Mormon history in the 2000s
  - Timeline of LGBTQ Mormon history in the 2010s
  - Timeline of LGBTQ Mormon history in the 2020s
  - Timeline of LGBTQ Mormon history in the early 20th century
- Chronology of Jesus
- Timeline of Christian missions (31 CE–present)
- Timeline of official adoptions of Christianity
- Timeline of Eastern Orthodoxy in North America
- Timeline of Orthodox Tewahedo Christianity
- Timeline of the English Reformation (1380–1690)
- Timeline of women as Protestant bishops (1929–present)
- Timeline of women as archbishops (1934–present)

=== Hinduism ===
- Timeline of Hinduism
- Timeline of Hindu texts

=== Islam ===
- Baháʼí timeline
- Timeline of early Islamic history
- Timeline of the history of Islam (545–present)
- Timeline of the Muslim presence in the Iberian Peninsula

=== Jainism ===
- Timeline of Jainism

=== Judaism ===
- Timeline of women hazzans (1884–present)
- Timeline of women hazzans in the United States (1884–present)
- Timeline of anti-Zionism
- Timeline of antisemitism
- Timeline of LGBTQ Jewish history
- Timeline of women rabbis (1890s–present)

=== Sikhism ===
- Sikh gurus (1469–1666)

== Science ==
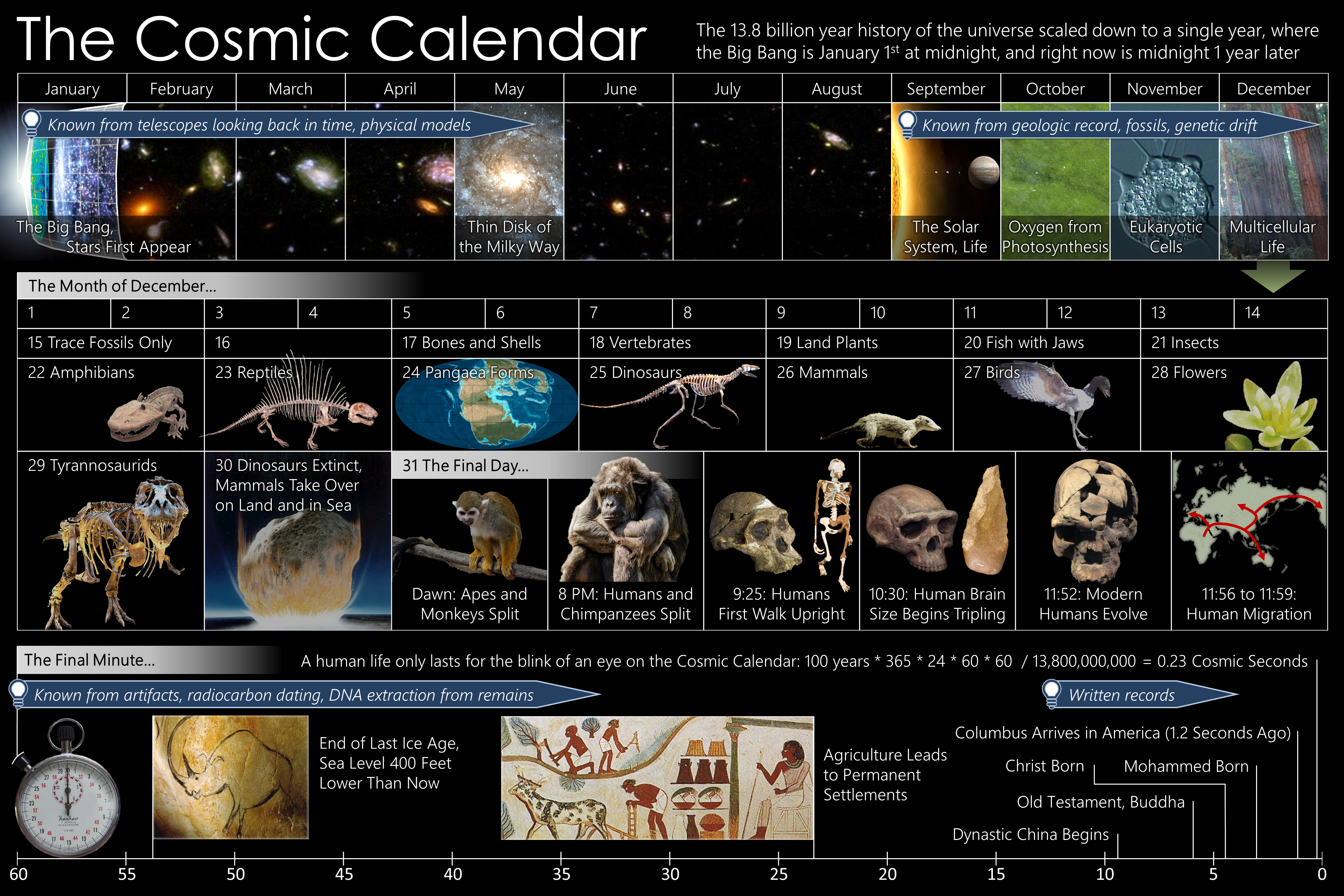
A graphical view of the Cosmic Calendar, featuring the months of the year, days of December, and the final minute.

The Cosmic Calendar is a method to visualize the chronology of the universe, scaling its current age of 13.8 billion years to a single year in order to help intuit it for pedagogical purposes in science education or popular science.

- Chronology of the universe
- List of years in science (1st century BCE – present)
  - 2026 in science
- Timeline of nature
- Timeline of historic inventions (7th century BCE – present)
- Timeline of scientific discoveries (17th century BCE – present)
- Timeline of scientific experiments (240 BCE – present)
- Timeline of the history of scientific method (2000 BCE – 2009 CE)
- Timeline of science and engineering in the Muslim world (610 CE – present)
- Timeline of Polish science and technology (1251 – present)
- Timeline of dendrochronology timestamp events (~10,000 BCE–present)

=== Anthropology ===
- Timeline of human development
- Timeline of anthropology (1870–2020)
- Timeline of archaeology (1506 – present)

=== Astronautics and planetary science ===
- Timeline of first orbital launches by country (1957–2022)
- Timeline of Solar System exploration (1944–present)
- Timeline of space travel by nationality (1961–present)

=== Astronomy, astrophysics, and cosmology ===
- Timeline of cosmological theories (16th century BCE – present)
- Timeline of stellar astronomy (137 BCE – 1967 CE)
- Timeline of solar astronomy (850 CE – present)
- Timeline of solar system astronomy (2137 BCE – present)
- Outer space by year (1944 – present)
- Timeline of discovery of Solar System planets and their moons (3,300,000 BCE – present)
- Timeline of white dwarfs, neutron stars, and supernovae (185 CE – 2017)
- Timeline of knowledge about galaxies, clusters of galaxies, and large-scale structure (964 CE – present)
- Timeline of knowledge about the interstellar and intergalactic medium (1848 CE – 1990)
- Timeline of cosmic microwave background astronomy (1896 CE – 2009)
- Timeline of astronomical maps, catalogs, and surveys (1800 BCE – present)
- Timeline of astronomy
- Timeline of Chinese astronomy
- Timeline of the Big Bang (13,700,000,000 BCE – 100,000,000,000,000 CE)
- Timeline of the future of the universe
- Timeline of black hole physics (1640 CE – present)
- Timeline of planetary exploration
- Timeline of telescopes, observatories, and observing technology
- List of asteroid close approaches to Earth

=== Biology ===
- Biology timelines
  - Human timeline
  - Life timeline
  - Nature timeline
- Timeline of biology and organic chemistry
- Timeline of biotechnology (7,000 BCE–present)
- Brain development timelines
- Timeline of evolution
- Timeline of extinctions
- Timeline of fish evolution
- Timeline of human evolution
- Macaque brain development timeline
- Mouse brain development timeline
- Timeline of plant evolution
- Timeline of life
- Timeline of senescence research
- Timeline of zoology

=== Chemistry ===
- Timeline of chemistry
- Timeline of chemical elements discoveries
- Timeline of physical chemistry

=== Environmental sciences ===
- List of years in the environment and environmental sciences

=== Geology and paleontology ===
- Timeline of geology (1025–1980)
- Timeline of Earth
- Timeline of Earth estimates
- Geologic time scale (Prehistory)
- Geologic timeline
- Geologic timeline of Western North America
- Timetable of the Precambrian (Prehistory)
- Timeline of paleontology (1027–2016)
- Timeline of paleontology in Michigan
- Timeline of paleontology in West Virginia
- Timeline of glaciation (Prehistory)
- New Zealand geologic time scale (Prehistory)
- Timeline of women in geology

=== Mathematics and statistics ===
- Timeline of algebra
- Timeline of algorithms (1600 BCE – present)
- Timeline of category theory and related mathematics (1890 CE–present)
- Timeline of computational mathematics
- Timeline of cryptography
- Timeline of geometry
- Timeline of information theory (1872–2008)
- Timeline of mathematics (70,000 BCE–present)
- Timeline of probability and statistics (19th century–present)
- Timeline of women in mathematics (350-370–present)
- Timeline of women in mathematics in the United States (1829–present)

=== Meteorology ===
- Timeline of meteorology (350 BCE – present)
- Timeline of temperature and pressure measurement technology (9th century CE–present)

=== Physiology, medicine, and health ===
- Progress of the SARS outbreak (2002–2004)
- Timeline of AIDS (1930s–present)
- Timeline of antibiotics (1935 CE–present)
- Timeline of medicine and medical technology (27th century BCE–present)
- Timeline of sexual orientation and medicine (1886–present)
- Timeline of vaccines (1796–present)
- 2009 flu pandemic timeline (2009–2010)
- 2014 Ebola virus disease epidemic timeline (2013–present)

=== Physics ===
- Timeline of fundamental physics discoveries (250 BCE–present)
- Timeline of classical mechanics (300s BCE–1992 CE)
- Timeline of computational physics
- Timeline of condensed matter physics (1900–present)
- Timeline of electromagnetism and classical optics (424 BCE–1999 CE)
- Timeline of fluid and continuum mechanics (300 BCE–present)
- Timeline of thermodynamics (1650 CE–present)
- Timeline of states of matter and phase transitions (1895–2000)
- Timeline of gravitational physics and relativity (9th century CE–2019)
- Timeline of atomic and subatomic physics (585 BCE–present)
- Timeline of particle discoveries (1800–present)
- Timeline of nuclear fusion (1929–present)
- Timeline of nuclear program of Iran (1956–present)
- Timeline of carbon nanotubes (1952–present)
- Timeline of quantum mechanics (1801–present)
- Timeline of crystallography (1723–present)

=== Psychology ===
- Timeline of psychology (1550 BCE–present)
- Timeline of coaching psychology (1926–present)
- Timeline of psychotherapy (1550 BCE–present)

== Sports ==
- Timeline of changes in the sport of athletics
- Timeline of Cape Verdean football
- Timeline of college football in Kansas
- Timeline of English football
- Timeline of association football (3rd century BCE–present)
- Timeline of Scottish football
- Timeline of women's sports (1780–present)
- Timeline of foundation of national rugby unions (1871–2015)
- Timeline of golf history (1353–1850)
- Timeline of golf history (1851–1945)
- Timeline of golf history (1945–1999)
- List of tennis timelines
- Timeline of Malian football
- Timeline of Senegalese football
- Tennis performance timeline comparison
- Timeline of the Maharlika Pilipinas Basketball League
- Timeline of the National Football League
- Timeline of women's basketball
- Timeline of golf (2000–present)

== Technology ==
- History of technology (2.5 Mya–present)
- Timeline of historic inventions (3.3–2.6 Mya–present)
- Timelines of United States inventions and discoveries (1717–2009)
- Timeline of Russian inventions and technology records
- Timeline of sustainable energy research 2020–present
- List of technologies

=== Communication and information media ===
- Timeline of communication technology (36th century BCE–present)
- Timeline of digital radio in the United Kingdom
- Timeline of Global Radio
- Timeline of Grampian Television
- Timeline of Granada Television
- Timeline of Greatest Hits Radio
- Timeline of Hits Radio
- Timeline of independent radio in the United Kingdom
- Timeline of ITV
- Timeline of ITV Digital Channels
- Timeline of ITV in Wales
- Timeline of ITV News
- Timeline of local television in the UK
- Timeline of London Weekend Television
- Timeline of non-flagship BBC television channels
- Timeline of radio
- Timeline of radio in London
- Timeline of radio in Manchester
- Timeline of radio in Northern Ireland
- Timeline of radio in Scotland
- Timeline of radio in Wales
- Timeline of Radio Luxembourg
- Timeline of Radio Televisyen Malaysia
- Timeline of regional news on ITV
- Timeline of RTÉ Radio
- Timeline of RTÉ Television
- Timeline of Scottish Television
- Timeline of Smooth Radio
- Timeline of Southern Television
- Timeline of television in London
- Timeline of television in Northern Ireland
- Timeline of television in Scotland
- Timeline of television in Wales
- Timeline of television news in the United Kingdom
- Timeline of Thames Television
- Timeline of the BBC News Channel
- Timeline of the BBC Television Service
- Timeline of the BBC World Service
- Timeline of the Heart Radio Network
- Timeline of postal history (1639–present)
- Timeline of the telephone (1849–present)
- Timeline of train radio in Norway
- Timeline of Tyne Tees Television
- Timeline of Ulster Television
- Timeline of Westcountry Television
- Timeline of the introduction of television in countries and regions (1928–2018)
- Timeline of the introduction of color television in countries (1950–1987)
- Timeline of CGI in film and television (1961–present)
- Timeline of 5 (British TV channel)
- Timeline of Absolute Radio
- Timeline of Anglia Television
- Timeline of Australian radio
- Timeline of Australian television
- Timeline of BBC Local Radio
- Timeline of BBC One
- Timeline of BBC Radio 1
- Timeline of BBC Radio 2
- Timeline of BBC Radio 3
- Timeline of BBC Radio 4
- Timeline of BBC Radio 5 Live
- Timeline of BBC Radio London
- Timeline of BBC Radio News
- Timeline of BBC Television News
- Timeline of BBC Two
- Timeline of Border Television
- Timeline of breakfast radio programmes in the UK
- Timeline of breakfast television in the United Kingdom
- Timeline of cable television in the United Kingdom
- Timeline of Capital Radio
- Timeline of Carlton Television
- Timeline of Central Independent Television
- Timeline of Channel 4
- Timeline of Channel Television
- Timeline of chart shows on UK radio
- Timeline of children's television on ITV
- Timeline of children's television on other British TV channels
- Timeline of children's television on the BBC
- Timeline of commercial television in the Republic of Ireland

Library science

- Timeline of women in library science
- Timeline of Yorkshire Television

=== Computers and related technology ===
- Timeline of free and open-source software (1976–present)
- Timeline of GitHub
- Timeline of Google Search
- Timeline of hypertext technology (1945–2001)
- Timeline of computer viruses and worms (1966–present)
- Timeline of social media (1979/1980–present)
- Timeline of the history of the Internet
- Timeline of Linux kernel development (1991–present)
- Timeline of computing
- Timeline of DOS operating systems
- Timeline of Dropbox
- Timeline of e-commerce
- Timeline of early 3D computer graphics hardware
- Timeline of file sharing
- Microprocessor chronology
- Timeline of programming languages
- History of computer science
- Timeline of video game console releases
- Timeline of operating systems (1951–present)
- Timeline of artificial intelligence (Antiquity–present)
- Timeline of machine translation
- Timeline of quantum computing and communication (1970–present)
- Timeline of computer security hacker history (1971–present)
- Timeline of women in computing (1842–present)
- Timeline of online advertising

=== Everyday necessities ===
- Timeline of agriculture and food technology (12,000 BCE – present)
- Timeline of clothing and textiles technology (50,000 BCE–1963)

=== Light and optical instruments ===
- Timeline of lighting technology (Prehistory–present)
- Timeline of microscope technology (1590–present)
- Timeline of photography technology (1717–present)
- Timeline of telescope technology (antiquity–present)
- Timeline of telescopes, observatories, and observing technology (1000–present)

=== Measurement ===
- Timeline of International Kilogram Prototypes (1880–present)
- Timeline of temperature and pressure measurement technology (1450–1930)
- Timeline of time measurement technology (270 BCE–present)

=== General mechanical engineering ===
- Timeline of motor and engine technology (c. 30–70 CE–present)
- Timeline of electrical and electronics engineering
- Timeline of heat engine technology (Prehistory– present)
- History of robots (Ancient times – present)

=== Transportation and space exploration ===
- List of years in rail transport
  - 2026 in rail transport
- Timeline of African Union of Railways
- Maritime timeline (45,000 BCE–1994)
- Timeline of transportation technology (20,000 BCE–present)
- Timeline of railway history (428 BCE–present)
- Timeline of United States railway history (1810s–present)
- Timeline of the London Underground (1820s–present)
- Timeline of the New York, Susquehanna and Western Railway
- Timeline of motorized bicycle history (1868–1986)
- Timeline of aviation (1700/1000 BCE–present)
- Timeline of aviation before the 18th century
  - Timeline of aviation in the 18th century
  - Timeline of aviation in the 19th century
  - Timeline of aviation in the 20th century
- Timeline of Class I railroads (1910–1929)
- Timeline of Class I railroads (1930–1976)
- Timeline of Class I railroads (1977–present)
- Cleethorpes Coast Light Railway timeline
- Timeline of early North American automobiles
- Timeline of electric vehicles
- Expansion timeline of the Moscow Metro
- Harley-Davidson engine timeline
- Timeline of rocket and missile technology (1st century–2010)
- Timeline of spaceflight
- Timeline of artificial satellites and space probes (1957–2010)
  - Timeline of Gravity Probe B

=== Miscellaneous ===
- Timeline of biotechnology (7,000 BCE–present)
- Timeline of British breweries (1880–2000)
- Timeline of diving technology (Prehistory–present)
- Timeline of materials technology (29,000 BCE–present)
- Women in dentistry (16th century–present)
- Timeline of female education (1608–present)
- Timeline of hydrogen technologies (1625–present)
- Timeline of solar cells (1839–present)
- Female education in the United States (1639–present)
- Timeline of women's colleges in the United States (1742–present)
- Timeline of low-temperature technology (1850–present)
- Women in dentistry in the United States (1855–present)
- Timeline of historically black women's colleges (1870–present)
- List of first female mayors (1887–present)
- Timeline of particle physics technology (1896–1968)

== Terrorism ==
- Timeline of terrorist attacks in the United States (1782–present)
- Timeline of the September 11 attacks (1950–present)
  - Timeline for the day of the September 11 attacks (11 September 2001)
  - Timeline of Saddam Hussein and al-Qaeda link allegations
  - The Terror Timeline
  - Timeline for September following the September 11 attacks (11–30 September 2001)
  - Timeline for October following the September 11 attacks (October 2001)
  - Timeline beyond October following the September 11 attacks (November 2001–present)
- Timeline of Earth Liberation Front actions (1997–present)
- Timeline of events related to Abu Sayyaf (2016)
- Timeline of the 2011 Norway attacks (1999–22 July 2011)
- Timeline of Abu Sayyaf attacks (2000–present)
- Timeline of airliner bombing attacks
- Timeline of al-Qaeda attacks
- Timeline of terrorism in Egypt (2013–present)

== See also ==
- Chronology
- Common Era (explains CE and BCE)
- Dating creation
- Hindu/Vedic chronometry
- Holocene calendar
- New chronology (Fomenko)
- Tamil chronometry
- Timeline
- Templates:
  - Human timeline
  - Life timeline
  - Nature timeline
- Ussher chronology
