= Timeline of New Zealand =

Timeline of New Zealand may refer to:

- Timeline of New Zealand history
- Timeline of the New Zealand environment
- Timeline of New Zealand's links with Antarctica

== See also ==
- History of New Zealand
- Category:Years in New Zealand
- List of timelines
