= Timeline of Zambia (Northern Rhodesia) =

Timeline of Zambia (Northern Rhodesia)

This page presents a simple timeline of important events in Zambian History (formerly Northern Rhodesia).

- 1885 - Berlin Conference and the ensuing agreement led to the "Scramble for Africa"
- 1888 - Northern and Southern Rhodesia, now Zambia and Zimbabwe, were proclaimed a British sphere of influence.
- 1890 - Frank Elliott Lochner told Lewanika that BSAC represented the British government, and on 27 June 1890 Lewanika consented to an exclusive mineral concession (called the Lochner concession).
- 1895 - American scout, Frederick Russell Burnham, led Northern Territories (BSA) Exploration Co. expedition identifying major copper deposits.
- 1911 - Northern Rhodesia established as a protectorate administered by the British South Africa Company, (BSAC), a chartered company on behalf of the British Government.
- 1924 - British Colonial Office took control of Northern Rhodesia as a Territory from BSAC. Livingstone chosen as the first capital.
- 1928 - Copper discovered in the region now known as the Copperbelt.
- 1935 -
  - Capital transferred to Lusaka.
  - Strike of African mineworkers in the Copperbelt.
- 1938-64 - Anglo American Corporation (AAC) and the South African Rhodesian Selection Trust (RST), controlled copper industry.
- 1940 - African Mineworkers strike again.
- 1942 - Federation of Welfare Societies established (forerunner of the ANC).
- 1948 - Northern Rhodesia Congress (NRC) established with Godwin Lewanika as its first president.
- 1951 - NRC changed name to Northern Rhodesian African National Congress under the presidency of Harry Nkumbula, and was linked to the African National Congress in South Africa.
- 1953 -
  - Kenneth Kaunda became general secretary of Northern Rhodesian ANC.
  - Central African Federation established.
- 1958 - ANC was divided on whether to participate in general elections in which only a minority of the black population was allowed to vote. Kaunda broke away and formed the Zambian African National Congress (ZANC).
- 1959 - ZANC was banned in 1959.
- 1962 - Two-stage election held in October and December resulted in an African majority in the legislative council.
- 1963 - 31 December 1963, the federation was dissolved.
- 1964 - Republic of Zambia established on 24 October 1964. Kenneth Kaunda became Zambia's first President.
- 1991 - Frederick Chiluba became the second President of Zambia.
- 2002 - Levy Mwanawasa became the third President of Zambia.
- 2008 - Rupiah Banda became the fourth President of Zambia.
- 2011 - Michael Sata became the fifth President of Zambia.
- 2014 - Guy Scott became Acting President of Zambia after Sata's death on October 28.
- 2015 - Edgar Lungu became the sixth President of Zambia.
- 2021 - Hakainde Hichilema of the United Party for National Development (UPND) became the 7th President of the Republic of Zambia

Links

Politics of Zambia | Timelines | List of Timelines
