= Timelines of the future =

There are some articles regarding this topic:

- 3rd millennium, up to the year 3000
- Timeline of the far future, events beyond the year 3000
- List of future calendar events
- List of future astronomical events

== Fictional timelines ==
- List of stories set in a future now in the past
- Timeline of Star Trek – science fiction television series, later expanded to other media.

== See also ==
- Timeline of the future of the universe
