= Timeline of the Edgar Lungu presidency =

Edgar Lungu, a lawyer and Patriotic Front (PF) politician originally from Ndola in Northern Rhodesia—then part of the Federation of Rhodesia and Nyasaland (present-day Copperbelt Province)—served as the sixth President of Zambia from January 2015 to August 2021. He initially came to power after winning a narrow victory over opposition leader Hakainde Hichilema in the January 2015 by-election, triggered by the death of President Michael Sata, and was inaugurated on 25 January 2015. He was re-elected in the August 2016 general election and served a full five-year term until 24 August 2021, when he peacefully handed over power following his electoral defeat to Hichilema.

Lungu's presidency saw significant infrastructure development and initiatives aimed at economic diversification. However, his tenure was also marked by controversies, including allegations of authoritarian governance, Zambia’s debt default amid economic difficulties, and legal disputes regarding his constitutional eligibility for a third term. Following his electoral loss, Lungu briefly retired from active politics but returned in 2023, resulting in the revocation of his presidential retirement benefits, as Zambian law prohibits politically active former presidents from receiving such entitlements. In December 2024, Zambia’s Constitutional Court ruled that Lungu's partial term from 2015 to 2016 constituted a full term, thus making him constitutionally ineligible to run again in the 2026 presidential election.

The following sections detail the timeline of Edgar Lungu’s presidency, including his rise to power, policy initiatives, major controversies, and the legal challenges that eventually barred him from seeking future office.

== Presidency ==
=== 2014 ===
- October: President Michael Sata dies; Lungu, then Minister of Defence and Justice, emerges as a leading contender.
- November: Lungu wins Patriotic Front (PF) party convention, becoming its candidate for the upcoming by-election.

=== 2015 ===
- 20 January: Wins by-election to complete Sata’s term, defeating Hakainde Hichilema.
- 25–26 January: Sworn in as President of Zambia.
- 8 March: Collapses at Women’s Day event in Lusaka; undergoes surgery in South Africa for oesophageal narrowing.
- July: Commutes death sentences of 332 prisoners to life imprisonment to reduce prison overcrowding.
- October: Officially declares 18 October as the National Day of Prayer, Fasting, Repentance, and Reconciliation.

=== 2016 ===
- August: Wins general election with 50.35% against Hichilema in a closely contested vote.
- 13 September: Sworn in for his first full five-year term.

=== 2016–2021: Full 5 Year Term Overview ===
- Leads major infrastructure development programs focusing on roads and airports.
- Pushes economic diversification initiatives to reduce reliance on copper.
- Appoints Inonge Wina as Zambia’s first female Vice President.
- Institutionalizes National Day of Prayer.
- 11 April 2017: Opposition leader Hichilema arrested and charged with treason after an incident with Lungu's motorcade.
- November 2020: Defaulted on a US $42.5 million Eurobond coupon, becoming Africa’s first pandemic-era sovereign default.

=== 2021 ===
- August: Loses presidential election to Hichilema.
- 24 August: Term ends; Hichilema takes office as Zambia's seventh president.

== Post‑Presidency ==
- 2023: Edgar Lungu announced his return to active politics to lead the Patriotic Front (PF) party once again, positioning himself as a key opposition figure ahead of the 2026 general election.
- December 2024: Constitutional Court rules his 2015–2016 term counts as full, disqualifying him from running in 2026.
- Continues serving as PF president and Tonse Alliance chairperson despite ineligibility.

== Death ==
- 5 June 2025: Dies in Pretoria, South Africa, from complications related to surgery for an oesophageal condition.

== Summary Table ==
| Event/Period | Details |
|---|---|
| Jan 2015 – Aug 2016 | Completed Sata’s term after winning the 2015 by-election |
| Sep 2016 – Aug 2021 | Served full term after 2016 general election victory |
| August 2021 | Lost to Hichilema in landslide |
| Dec 2024 | Court bars him from 2026 run |
| June 2025 | Died in South Africa |

== Legacy ==
=== Achievements ===
- Spearheaded infrastructure expansion across Zambia.
- Initiated significant prison reforms.
- Appointed first female vice president in national history.

=== Controversies ===
- Oversaw Zambia’s first sovereign debt default in COVID‑19 era.
- Facing allegations of authoritarianism, including treason charges against Hichilema.
- Judicial dispute over his eligibility for a third term.
