= Timeline of LGBTQ history in Botswana =

This is a timeline of notable events in the history of the lesbian, gay, bisexual and transgender (LGBT) community in Botswana.

== 20th Century ==
=== 1966 ===
- Botswana gained independence from the United Kingdom and inherited two articles in its Penal Code that criminalized male homosexuality: sections 164 and 167. The prohibition of homosexuality was first instituted in the territory in the 19th century, when the British Empire established the Bechuanaland protectorate.

=== 1994 ===
- December 26: two men were arrested for having sex, and one of them argued in his defense that the criminalization of homosexuality was unconstitutional in a court case that became known as the Kanane Case. The following year, a court ruled that the criminalization of homosexuality is not unconstitutional, but the case was appealed.

=== 1998 ===
- The group LEGABIBO is created, the first LGBT activism group in the history of the country.
- The Botswana government introduced a series of legal reforms aimed at eliminating legal discrimination against women. As part of these reforms, the articles that previously condemned male homosexuality were updated to remove the gender specification, with sections 164 and 167 now condemning both male and female homosexuality.

== 21st Century ==
=== 2000 ===
- President Festus Mogae issued an official document regarding the country's strategy to address the HIV epidemic, calling for "no judgment" of groups vulnerable to the virus, including homosexual people.

=== 2003 ===
- July 30: The Botswana Court of Appeal reaffirmed its 1995 verdict in the Kanane Case, declaring that the criminalization of homosexuality in the country was not unconstitutional. According to the Court, the original law was discriminatory because it only applied to men. However, the Court opined that with the 1998 amendments, the law was no longer discriminatory.

=== 2007 ===
- December: In commemoration of World AIDS Day, LGBT activists held a celebration in Tlokweng that brought together around 50 people. The event was the first of its kind in the country. The following year, the celebration was moved to September.

=== 2009 ===
- The United Nations Human Rights Committee issues a report recommending that Botswana decriminalize homosexuality.

=== 2010 ===
- September: As part of an update to its labor law, Botswana prohibits discrimination based on sexual orientation in the workplace.

=== 2011 ===
- January: The Vice-President of Botswana's National Assembly, Pono Moatlhodi, caused controversy by stating during a parliamentary meeting that homosexual people were "demonic and evil" and that, if it were up to him, they would be killed.

=== 2013 ===
- February 12: The first edition of Batho Ba Lorato, Botswana's first LGBT film festival, begins.

=== 2014 ===
- May 17: The first edition of the Queer Shorts Showcase Festival, the first LGBT theater festival in Botswana, takes place.
- November 14: The Botswana High Court issued a ruling in favor of the organization LEGABIBO, ordering the government to legally register it. The case began after the government denied LEGABIBO's registration application in 2012, arguing that the Botswana Constitution "does not recognize homosexuals." The government appealed the decision, but the ruling was reaffirmed on March 16, 2016. LEGABIBO was finally officially registered as an organization on April 28, 2016.

=== 2016 ===
- September 20: American pastor Steven Anderson was deported from Botswana on the orders of President Ian Khama after stating on a radio program that homosexuals should be stoned to death. President Khama stated that the pastor was deported because Botswanans "do not want hate speech in this country" and that if he wanted to do it, he should do it "in his own country."
- September: LEGABIBO publishes the book Dipolelo Tsa Rona, a collection of ten stories featuring the experiences of LGBT people from Botswana.

=== 2017 ===
- September 29: The Botswana High Court issued a ruling in favor of a trans man and ordered the updating of his gender on his official documents, making him the first trans person to achieve recognition of his gender identity in the country.
- December 10: The High Court rules in favor of Ricki Kgositau, the second trans person to obtain the right to update their gender.

=== 2019 ===
- June 11: The Botswana High Court declared unconstitutional the provisions of sections 164 and 167 of the Penal Code that criminalized same-sex relations. The unanimous decision decriminalized homosexuality in the country and stated that the struck-down laws violated the privacy, freedom, and dignity of LGBT people.
- September 28: The film 2064 premieres, considered the first LGBT feature film from Botswana.
- November 30: The first Gaborone Pride celebration takes place, considered the first LGBT Pride event in the country.

=== 2021 ===
- November 29: The Botswana Court of Appeal unanimously reaffirms the 2019 ruling that decriminalized homosexuality.

=== 2022 ===
- January 24: President Mokgweetsi Masisi officially met with LGBT activists from the organization LEGABIBO , who conveyed the needs of Botswana's LGBT population. Masisi, in turn, pledged to consult with them on issues related to their rights.

=== 2024 ===
- October 30: LGBT rights lawyer Duma Boko is elected president of Botswana in the 2024 general elections. Years earlier, Boko had acted as the lawyer for the LGBT organization LEGABIBO in its lawsuit to gain government recognition in the country.

=== 2025 ===
- November 1: The first Pride march takes place in Palapye.

=== 2026 ===
- March 26: The Botswana government officially removes from the Penal Code the provisions of Section 164 that criminalized homosexuality, which had been declared unconstitutional by the Botswana High Court in 2019.
