= Timeline of the Eritrean–Ethiopian War =

This is chronology of the Eritrean–Ethiopian War, a war between Ethiopia and Eritrea over Badme region from 1998 to 2000.

== Timeline ==
- 6 May 1998 – Large scale Eritrean mechanized force penetrated the Badme region, resulting fighting between Eritrean soldiers and the Tigrayan militia and security police they encountered.
- 13 May 1998 – In what Eritrean radio described as a "total war" policy, Ethiopia mobilized its forces for a full assault against Eritrea.
- 5 June 1998 – The Eritrean air force attacked an elementary school in Mekelle that killed 49 of the students and their parents and the neighbors that came to help immediately.
- 22 February 1999 – With refusal to accept the US/Rwanda peace plan, Ethiopia launched a massive military offensive to recapture Badme.
- 6 February 1999 – Hostility worsened following Ethiopia's claim that Eritrea violated moratorium on air raids by bombing Adigrat.
- 27 February 1999 – Eritrea accepted OAU peace plan after Ethiopian force were 10 kilometers (six miles) deep into Eritrean territory after five days of heavy fighting.
- 16 March 1999 – BBC reported that after a two week lull, fighting occurred when the Ethiopian force attacked at Valessa on the Tsorona front line.
- June 1999 – Fighting continued with both sides in entrenched positions.
- Early May 2000 – Proximity talks broke down with Ethiopia accusing Eritrea of imposing "unacceptable conditions".
- 12 May 2000 – Ethiopia launched massive combined arms offensive on multiple fronts involving four armoured divisions and 22 infantry divisions.
- 16 May 2000 – Ethiopian sources stated that Ethiopian aircraft attacked targets between Areza and Maidema and between Barentu and Omhajer and that all aircraft returned to base, while heavy ground fighting continued in the Da'se and Barentu area and in Maidema.
- 17 May 2000 – The United Nations Security Council adopted Resolution 1298 imposing an arms embargo on both countries.
- 23 May 2000 – Ethiopia claimed that its "troops had seized vital command posts in the heavily defended Zalambessa area, about 100 km (60 mi) south of the Eritrean capital Asmara.
- 25 May 2000 – In accordance with OAU request and Eritrean withdrawal from some territories, Ethiopia declared the war was over.
- 18 June 2000 – the parties agreed to a comprehensive agreement and binding arbitration of their disputes under the Algiers Agreement.
- 31 July 2000 – The United Nations Security Council adopted Resolution 1312 and a 25-kilometer-wide Temporary Security Zone (TSZ) was established within Eritrea.
- 12 December 2000 – Peace agreement was signed by the two governments.
