= Timeline of the Battle of France =

The Timeline of the Battle of France, also known as the Fall of France, covers the period during World War II from the first military actions between Germany and France and to the armistice signed by France. Over the period of six weeks, from May 10 to June 25, 1940, Nazi Germany had also conquered Belgium, Netherlands and Luxembourg. Nazi Germany's overall plan was to invade the Low Countries which would make the French and British troops leave their current position and position their forces in Belgium. Then, a second force would navigate through the Ardennes Forest and move around the Maginot Line at the weakest part of the Allied defences. The force would then move towards the west French coast and cut the northern Allied force off. The Germans would then capture Paris, eliminate any resistance that remained, cross the English Channel, and invade the United Kingdom.

== September 1939 ==
- 2 September: Tensions began to flare with Germany as Britain and France put Germany on notice for the invasion of Poland.
- 3 September: France declared war on Nazi Germany.
- 7 September: French forces engage in light skirmishes with German forces near Saarbrücken.
- 10 September: British forces arrived to reinforce the French.

== May 1940 ==
- 3 May: Abwehr Colonel Hans Oster, a secret anti-Nazi, sends a warning to the Dutch Government about the German invasion of France.
- 10 May: At 2:30 Germany's land forces move into Belgium, Luxembourg and the Netherlands. Winston Churchill becomes Prime Minister of the United Kingdom.
- 11 May: British and French forces move into Belgium and begin a long line of strategic defenses in the center of the country to defend Belgium in an effort to force the Germans to halt their advance.
- 12 May: German General Guderian with his three divisions successfully reach the Meuse River. The French believed it would take 4 days to cross the Meuse River, but the German engineers completed the bridgehead at Dinant, Montherme and Sedan in just 24 hours.
- 13 May: The first German forces emerge from the Ardennes on the river Meuse, facing stiff resistance.
- 14 May: German Panzer Corps 15, 44, and 19 face only a small amount of Allied forces and were able to set up bridgeheads. British air support fails to destroy bridgeheads. Panzer Corps 15 and 19 break through Allied defenses at Sedan, which allows German forces to bypass the Maginot line.
- 15 May: Germany plans the final push into France, moving all troops and tanks toward Paris and the English Channel coast. The Germans had air superiority and the Maginot line proved to be worthless. The Dutch surrender to the Germans after heavy bombing across Rotterdam.
- 17-18 May: Antwerp and Brussels would fall to Germany; the Allies were forced to retreat to the coastline of France.
- 20 May: General Maxime Weygand replaces General Maurice-Gustave Gamelin as supreme Allied commander due to major losses across France. Winston Churchill ordered preparations of ships and vessels to evacuate British forces from the coast of France. German forces reached the English Channel.
- 21 May: The allied forces tried to counterattack the German forces but were repelled by another advancing German land force near Arras.
- 24 May: The Luftwaffe bombers bombed Allied defensive positions around Dunkirk. Hitler ordered all his forces to halt and not cross the Lens-Bethune-St-Omer-Gravelines line, which allowed Allied forces more time to reach the coast of France.
- 25 May: German forces took Boulogne as more retreating Allied forces reach Dunkirk.
- 26 May: Around 850 British civilian ships and vessels help assisted Allied forces of Dunkirk, which would become the largest military evacuation in history. On 6:57 PM Operation Dynamo code name for the evacuation of British forces from Dunkirk took place. Hitler also ordered his army forces towards Dunkirk to finally destroy the Allies. HMS Curlew was sunk from the air by the Luftwaffe.
- 27 May: Allies enter Narvik.
- 28 May: King Leopold of Belgium had ordered his army to surrender to the German forces, which gave the Allies the needed time to evacuate from Dunkirk. With Belgium under complete German control, Germany planned to move toward the French coast to eliminate the Allied forces. By nightfall about 25,000 British forces had evacuated from Dunkirk.
- 29 May: About 47,000 British forces were evacuated from Dunkirk.
- 30 May: About 6,000 French forces evacuate with around 120,000 Allied forces evacuating from Dunkirk.
- 31 May: Around 150,000 Allied soldiers arrive in Britain.

== June 1940 ==
- 1 June: The French sixteenth Corps took the defense of the region around Dunkirk. The British and French governments notified the Norwegian government of the evacuation of Dunkirk.
- 3 June: The German Luftwaffe bombed Paris.
- 4 June: Allied forces began to evacuate the area at Harstad. As 40,000 French troops were taken prisoners by the German army after the fall of Dunkirk. Operation Dynamo the evacuation from Dunkirk officially ended as around 338,326 British forces and 113,000 French forces were evacuated from Dunkirk to Britain. The German Luftwaffe ceased bombardment of Dunkirk.
- 5 June: The second part of the Battle of France began with the Germans striking south from the River Somme.
- 9 June: German forces launched an offensive on Paris.
- 10 June: Norway surrendered to German forces and Italy joined the war by declaring war on France and Great Britain.
- 12 June: The 51st Highland Division surrendered to German forces due to being surrounded.
- 13 June: Paris was declared an open city by the French government as the government fled to Bordeaux.
- 14 June: German troops entered the French capital of Paris.
- 16 June: French Marshal Henri-Philippe Petain became the prime minister of France, replacing Paul Reynaud. Operation Aerial and Operation Cycle took place by evacuating around 150,000 Allied soldiers from French ports of Cherbourg, St. Malo, Brest, St. Nazaire, La Pallice, Nantes, and Le Havre.
- 17 June: Petain asked Germany for armistice terms. Finishing off some Allied resistance, the Germans crossed the river Loire and reached the Swiss frontier.
- 18 June: Adolf Hitler and Benito Mussolini met in Munich Germany. General de Gaulle told the people of France on a broadcast from London on the BBC to resist the Germans.
- 22 June: France signed an armistice with Germany.
- 23 June: Adolf Hitler toured captured Paris.
- 24 June: The French officially surrendered at Compiegne, the site of the German World War I surrender.

== Notes and references ==
- Sheffield, Gary. "BBC - History - World Wars: The Fall of France." BBC News. BBC, 30 Mar. 2011. Web. 28 Mar. 2017.
- Horne, Alistair. To Lose a Battle: France 1940. Penguin UK, 2007.
- Bond, Brian. The Battle for France & Flanders: Sixty Years On. Pen and Sword, 2001.
- "BBC - History - Churchill Becomes Prime Minister (pictures, Video, Facts & News)." BBC News. BBC, n.d. Web. 30 Mar. 2017.
- The Battle of France 1940." Theriflesww1.org. N.p., n.d. Web. 28 Mar. 2017.
- Evans, Elinor. "The Fall of France: Hitler's Greatest Gamble." History Extra. BBC History Magazine, Jan.-Feb. 2017. Web. 30 Mar. 2017. <http://www.historyextra.com/article/bbc-history-magazine/fall-france-hitler%E2%80%99s-greatest-gamble>.
- "The Battle of France." RAF Museum. N.p., n.d. Web. 30 Mar. 2017. <http://www.rafmuseum.org.uk/research/online-exhibitions/history-of-the-battle-of-britain/the-battle-of-france.aspx>.
