= Timeline of strikes in 1948 =

Strikes in 1948

In 1948, a number of labour strikes, labour disputes, and other industrial actions occurred.

== Background ==
A labour strike is a work stoppage caused by the mass refusal of employees to work. This can include wildcat strikes, which are done without union authorisation, and slowdown strikes, where workers reduce their productivity while still carrying out minimal working duties. It is usually a response to employee grievances, such as low pay or poor working conditions. Strikes can also occur to demonstrate solidarity with workers in other workplaces or pressure governments to change policies.

== Timeline ==
=== Continuing strikes from 1948 ===
- 1947–49 Chicago printers' strike
- 1947–48 French West African rail strike, by railway workers in French West Africa.
- 1947–48 Kawasaki strike
- Pilbara strike
- Toho strikes

=== January ===
- 1948 American Federation of Musicians strike
- 1948 Cyprus miners' strike

=== February ===
- Jeju uprising
- 1948 Queensland railway strike

=== March ===
- 1948 Minnesota meatpackers' strike

=== April ===
- 1948 Boeing strike
- 1948 Southern Rhodesia general strike

=== May ===
- 1948 Hokkaido rail strikes
- 1948 Italian agricultural strikes

=== June ===
- 1948 Enmore strike, in Enmore, British Guiana.
- 1948 London docks strike

=== July ===
- 1948 Bahia textile strike
- July 1948 Italian general strike, general strike in Italy called by the Italian General Confederation of Labour following an assassination attempt on Palmiro Togliatti.

=== August ===
- 1948 Zanzibar general strike

=== September ===
- 1948 French miners' strike, fr.
- Longshore strike 1948

=== October ===
- 1948 New York brewery strike

== Changes in legislation ==
In July, the Japanese government issues Government Ordinance #201 following a directive from the under American post-war occupation authority, banning public sector workers from collective bargaining and striking.
