= Timeline of strikes in 1993 =

Strikes in 1993

A number of labour strikes, labour disputes, and other industrial actions occurred in 1993.

== Background ==
A labor strike is a work stoppage, caused by the mass refusal of employees to work, usually in response to employee grievances, such as low pay or poor working conditions. Strikes can also take place to demonstrate solidarity with workers in other workplaces or to pressure governments to change policies.

== Timeline ==
=== Continuing strikes from 1992 ===
- 1991–1998 Caterpillar labor dispute, including strikes by Caterpillar Inc. workers in the United States.
- 1990s Donbas miners' strikes
- 1991 Frontier strike, over 6-years long strike by workers at the New Frontier Hotel and Casino, represented by the Culinary Workers Union, one of the longest strikes in American history.
- 1990–93 Greyhound strike, by Greyhound Lines drivers.
- First Intifada, including strikes, against the Israeli occupation of the West Bank and the Gaza Strip.
- 1992–93 Polish miners' strike

=== January ===
- 1993 Cathay Pacific strike
- 1993 Dundee Timex Strike

=== April ===
- 1993 Canon Zhuhai strike

=== May ===
- 1993 East German steelworkers' strike
- 1993 Polish teachers' strike

=== July ===
- 1993 Israeli public sector strike

=== September ===
- 1993 Fiji sugar strike
- 1993 Indian truckers' strike
- 1993 Kennedy Center strike, 7-week strike by John F. Kennedy Center for the Performing Arts performers in the United States.
- 1993 Nicaraguan transport strike

=== October ===
- 1993 Air France strike
- 1993 Ciudad Bolívar civic strike, in Ciudad Bolívar, Bogotá, Colombia.
- 1993 Malaysian palm oil truckers' strike

=== November ===
- Belgian general strike of 1993

=== December ===
- 1993 New York legal services strike
