= Timeline of strikes in 1992 =

Strikes in 1992

A number of labour strikes, labour disputes, and other industrial actions occurred in 1992.

== Background ==
A labour strike is a work stoppage caused by the mass refusal of employees to work. This can include wildcat strikes, which are done without union authorisation, and slowdown strikes, where workers reduce their productivity while still carrying out minimal working duties. It is usually a response to employee grievances, such as low pay or poor working conditions. Strikes can also occur to demonstrate solidarity with workers in other workplaces or pressure governments to change policies.

== Timeline ==
=== Continuing strikes from 1991 ===
- 1991–1998 Caterpillar labor dispute, including strikes by Caterpillar Inc. workers in the United States.
- First Intifada, including strikes, against the Israeli occupation of Palestine.
- 1991 Frontier strike, over 6-years long strike by workers at the New Frontier Hotel and Casino, represented by the Culinary Workers Union, one of the longest strikes in American history.
- 1990–93 Greyhound strike, by Greyhound Lines drivers.
- 1990–1992 movement in Madagascar
- 1990–92 University of Bridgeport strike
- Vatukoula mine strike, 33-year strike by Vatukoula mine miners in Fiji, from 1991 to 2024.

=== March ===
- 1992 Pittsburgh bus strike, 26-day strike by bus drivers in Pittsburgh, United States.

=== April ===
- 1992 APPM Dispute, 3-week strike at an Associated Pulp and Paper mill in Burnie, Australia.
- 1992 German public sector strike, the largest public sector strike in Germany in 18 years.
- 1992 Filipino air traffic controllers' strike, 18-day strike by air traffic controllers in the Philippines.
- 1992 Kroger strike, 9-week strike by Kroger supermarket workers in the United States.
- 1992 NHL strike, by NHL ice hockey players in Canada and the United States.
- April 1992 Nepalese general strike

=== June ===
- 1992 Bangladesh transport strike
- 1992 Bermuda transport strike
- Southern California drywall strike
- 1992 United States railroad strike

=== July ===
- 1992–93 Polish strikes, mass wave of strikes in the Third Polish Republic.

=== August ===
- 1992 Russian air traffic controllers' strike
- 1992 South Africa general strike

=== September ===
- 1992 Detroit teachers' strike
- 1992 Palestinian prisoners' hunger strike, part of the First Intifada.

=== October ===
- 1992 Trintoc strike, 3-week strike by Trintoc oil workers in Trinidad and Tobago.

=== November ===
- 1992–93 Berkeley strike. Strike by graduate students at the University of California, Berkeley over union recognition.
- 1992 Italian tobacco strike, strike by workers of the Italian tobacco monopoly.

=== December ===
- 1992–93 Polish miners' strike, 20-day strike by coal miners against layoffs, part of the 1992–93 Polish strikes.
