= Timeline of strikes in 2001 =

Strikes in 2001

A number of labour strikes, labour disputes, and other industrial actions occurred in 2001.

== Background ==
A labour strike is a work stoppage caused by the mass refusal of employees to work. This can include wildcat strikes, which are done without union authorisation, and slowdown strikes, where workers reduce their productivity while still carrying out minimal working duties. It is usually a response to employee grievances, such as low pay or poor working conditions. Strikes can also occur to demonstrate solidarity with workers in other workplaces or pressure governments to change policies.

== Timeline ==
=== Continuing strikes from 2000 ===
- 1999–2001 Domino Sugar Refinery strike, 20-month strike by Domino Sugar Refinery workers in the United States.
- 2000–03 prisoners' hunger strike in Turkey
- 2000–01 Seattle newspaper strike
- Ukraine without Kuchma

=== January ===
- 2001 Danone crisis, crisis at French food group Danone, including strikes.

=== March ===
- 2001 Comair strike, 3-month by Comair pilots in the United States.

=== April ===
- April 2001 Bangladesh general strikes, series of general strikes called by the opposition in Bangladesh demanding the resignation of Prime Minister Sheikh Hasina.
- 2001 Hawaiian teachers' strike
- Jeffboat workers' wildcat strike of 2001
- 2001 Vancouver transit strike, 123-day strike by transit workers in Vancouver, Canada.

=== May ===
- 2001 Chennai port strike, 17-day strike by port workers in Chennai.
- 2001 Engen strike, strike by Engen Petroleum workers in South Africa.
- 2001 National Gallery of Canada strike, 2-month strike by National Gallery of Canada admin workers.

=== June ===
- 2001 Manipur general strike, general strike in Manipur against the Indian government's decision to extend a ceasefire with the separatist National Socialist Council of Nagaland to the state.
- 2001 University of Washington strike, strike by University of Washington teaching assistants, the first TA strike in the university's history.

=== July ===
- July 2001 Zimbabwe general strike, 2-day general strike in Zimbabwe organised by the Zimbabwe Congress of Trade Unions over increases in fuel prices.
- 2001 sex strike for running water

=== August ===
- August 2001 South African general strike, 2-day general strike organised by the Congress of South African Trade Unions against privatisation of government-owned companies.
- 2001 Volkswagen Mexico strike

=== September ===
- 2001 ShopRite strike, 7-week strike by ShopRite workers in New Jersey, the United States.

=== October ===
- Minnesota public sector strike
- 2001 Mozal strike, strike by aluminium workers at Mozal in Mozambique.

=== November ===
- 2001 Israeli lecturers' strike, 1-month strike by university lecturers in Israel.
- 2001 Middletown teachers' strike, strike by Middletown Township Public School District teachers in the United States; resulting in one of the largest mass arrests of teachers in the US in several decades.

=== December ===
- 2001 OHSU strike, 56-day strike by Oregon Health & Science University nurses.

== Statistics ==
According to the Bureau of Labor Statistics, "measures of work stoppage idleness - the number of days idle and percent of estimated working time lost because of strikes and lockouts - reached historic lows in 2001" in the United States, with 29 major work stoppages being recorded in the USA that year.
