= 2021 timeline of the Somali Civil War =

This is a 2021 timeline of events in the Somali Civil War (2009–present).

== March ==
- On 5 March 2021, a suicide car bombing occurred outside Luul Yemeni restaurant in Mogadishu. The attack killed at least 20 people and injured another 30.

== June ==
- On 15 June 2021, a suicide bombing occurred in Mogadishu. It happened at the General Dhegobadan Military Camp, where the bomber killed 15 army recruits.

== November ==
- On 25 November 2021, in Mogadishu, a suicide bomber in a sport utility vehicle killed eight people and wounded 17 others, including teachers and pupils at Mocaasir Primary and Secondary School, which was heavily damaged.

== See also ==
- Somali Civil War (2009–present)
