= Tennis performance timeline comparison =

Tennis performance timeline comparison may refer to:

- Tennis performance timeline comparison (men)
- Tennis performance timeline comparison (women) (1884–1977)
- Tennis performance timeline comparison (women) (1978–present)
