= Timeline of the 2016 Philippine general election =

The following are events related to the 2016 Philippine general election in general, as well as events concerning the presidential campaigns of individuals vying for presidency for 2016.

== Events ==
=== Before 2015 ===
Date	Event	Source
September 2011	Jejomar Binay announced his intention to run for President.	
October 20, 2014	Roy Señeres announce his intent to run as president.	
=== 2015 ===
Date	Event	Source
May 8, 2015	Deadline of registration for new party-list groups and submission of manifestations of intent for existing party-lists.	
July 31, 2015	Mar Roxas officially launched his presidential campaign.	
September 16, 2015	Grace Poe officially launched her presidential campaign.	
October 11, 2015	Roy Señeres formally launched his presidential campaign at the Liwasang Bonifacio in Manila.	
October 12–16, 2015	Filing of Certificate of Candidacy (COCs) for President down to Municipal Councilor level. The following individuals filed their certificate of candidacy to run for president (and vice president): October 12: Jejomar Binay (with Gringo Honasan); October 15: Grace Poe (with Chiz Escudero), Mar Roxas (with Leni Robredo); October 16: Martin Diño, Miriam Santiago (with Bongbong Marcos), Roy Señeres	
October 13, 2015	Miriam Defensor Santiago officially launched her presidential campaign.	
October 29, 2015	Martin Diño withdraws his certificate of candidacy to run as president.	
November 21, 2015	Rodrigo Duterte officially launched his presidential campaign.	
November 27, 2015	Rodrigo Duterte filed his certificate of candidacy as a substitute candidate for Martin Diño.	
=== 2016 ===
Date	Event	Source
January 9, 2016	Start of election gun ban	
January 10, 2016	Start of Election period	
February 5, 2015	Roy Señeres withdraws his presidential campaign citing health reasons.	
February 9, 2016	Start of Campaign period for president, vice president, senators and party-lists	
March 24–25, 2016	Campaign ban	
March 26, 2016	Start of Campaign period for district representatives and local officials	
April 9, 2016	Start of casting of ballots for overseas absentee voters. (until May 9, 2016)	
April 27–29, 2016	Casting of ballots for local absentee voters	
May 7, 2016	End of campaign period	
May 8–9, 2016	Campaign ban	
May 9, 2016	Election Day	
January 15, 2016	End of Election period	
June 30, 2016	Start of term of winning candidates	
