= Timeline of strikes in 1994 =

Strikes in 1994

A number of labour strikes, labour disputes, and other industrial actions occurred in 1994.

== Background ==
A labour strike is a work stoppage caused by the mass refusal of employees to work. This can include wildcat strikes, which are done without union authorisation, and slowdown strikes, where workers reduce their productivity while still carrying out minimal working duties. It is usually a response to employee grievances, such as low pay or poor working conditions. Strikes can also occur to demonstrate solidarity with workers in other workplaces or pressure governments to change policies.

== Timeline ==
=== Continuing strikes from 1993 ===
- 1991–1998 Caterpillar labor dispute, including strikes by Caterpillar Inc. workers in the United States.
- 1991 Frontier strike, over 6-years long strike by workers at the New Frontier Hotel and Casino, represented by the Culinary Workers Union, one of the longest strikes in American history.
- 1993–94 Kenyan university strike, year-long strike by university lecturers in Kenya.
- 1993–95 Porgera Dispute, at the Porgera Gold Mine in Papua New Guinea.

=== January ===
- 27 January 1994 general strike, general strike in Spain against a law that make it easier to fire workers.

=== February ===
- 1994 Bermudian hotel strike, strike by hotel workers in Bermuda over unpaid tips.
- 1994 Wallis and Futuna general strike, general strike in Wallis and Futuna.

=== March ===
- Frauenstreik 1994, the first national women's strike in Germany.

=== April ===
- 1994 Allegheny Ludlum strike, 70-day strike by Allegheny Ludlum steelworkers in the United States.
- 1994–95 Bridgestone strike, 10-month strike by Bridgestone workers in the United States, represented by the United Rubber Workers.
- 1994 National Book Store strike, strike by National Book Store workers in the Philippines over wages.
- 1994 United States truckers' strike, strike by truckers in the United States, represented by the International Brotherhood of Teamsters, the first nationwide truckers strike in the US in 15 years.

=== May ===
- 1994 Egyptian lawyers' strike, organised by the Egyptian Lawyers' Syndicate.
- 1994–96 Irving Oil Refinery strike, 27-month strike by Irving Oil Refinery workers in Canada.
- 1994 Russian pilots' strike, strike by airline pilots in Russia over safety standards.

=== June ===
- 1994 Dublin bar staff strike, 3-day strike by pub and bar staff in Dublin, Ireland, coinciding with the 1994 FIFA World Cup.
- 1994 German postal strike, over privatisation.
- 1994 Le Havre dockworkers' strike, strike by dockworkers in Le Havre, France.

=== July ===
- 1994–95 New Zealand teachers' strike, series of strikes by primary school teachers in Aotearoa New Zealand for pay parity with secondary school teachers.
- 1994 Nigerian oil strike, strike by oil workers after the arrest of opposition leader Moshood Abiola.

=== August ===
- 1994–95 Major League Baseball strike, 7-month strike by Major League Baseball players in Canada and the United States, represented by the Major League Baseball Players Association.
- 1994 Tomago aluminium strike, 24-day strike at the Tomago aluminium smelter in Australia over wages.

=== September ===
- 1994–95 Port Jervis nurses' strike, 6-month strike by nurses in Port Jervis, New York, United States, over wages.

=== November ===
- San Francisco newspaper strike of 1994, 11-day strike by workers of the two largest newspapers in San Francisco, United States, over wages and layoffs.

=== December ===
- 1994–95 Turkish public sector strikes, series of strikes by public sector workers in Turkey over wages.
