= Timeline of DC Comics =

The timeline of DC Comics is split up to decades:

- Timeline of DC Comics (1930s)
- Timeline of DC Comics (1940s)
- Timeline of DC Comics (1950s)
