= Timeline of coaching psychology =

== 1900s ==
- In 1926, American sports psychologist Coleman Griffith published his first book entitled The Psychology of Coaching: A Study of Coaching Methods in the Point of View of Psychology.
- In 1951, John Lawther of Penn State University published Psychology of Coaching.
- in 1967 Curtiss Gaylord published a book titled Modern Coaching Psychology, the first book to use "coaching psychology" in its title
- In 1970, James William Moore published The Psychology of Athletic Coaching.
- In 1976, Tim Gallwey publishes the book, The Inner Game of Tennis
- In 1977, James O. Prochaska of the University of Rhode Island, and Carlo Di Clemente and colleagues developed the transtheoretical model.
- In 1981, earliest known mention of S.M.A.R.T. goals
- In the late 1980s and 1990s, the GROW model was developed in the United Kingdom and was used extensively in corporate coaching.
- In 1997, Max Landsberg writes up GROW model in The tao of coaching

== 21st century ==
- In January 2000, Anthony Grant established the Coaching Psychology Unit at University of Sydney and through his doctoral studies set the stage for further research into coaching as an evidence-based discipline.
- In 2003, International Journal of Mentoring and Coaching in Education was formed
- In 2005, the journal The Coaching Psychologist was founded by the British Psychological Society.
- In 2006, Australian Psychological Society (APS) founded the Interest Group in Coaching Psychology (IGCP).
- In 2006, British Psychological Society (BPS) formed the Special Group in Coaching Psychology (SGCP).
- On December 18, 2006, the International Society for Coaching Psychology (ISCP) was founded in order to promote the international development of the field.
- In 2006, The Australian Psychological Society founded the International Coaching Psychology Review (since 2006).
- In 2008, The Journal Coaching: An International Journal of Theory, Research and Practice was formed.
- In 2009, International Society of Coaching Psychology founded the journal, Coaching Psychology International
- In 2009, Swedish Coaching Psychology Group was formed
- 2011, Society for Coaching changed name to "International Centre for Coaching Psychology Research
- In 2012, The Danish Journal of Coaching Psychology was founded
