= Timeline of LGBTQ history in Fiji =

This article is a timeline of notable events affecting the lesbian, gay, bisexual, transgender, and queer (LGBTQ) community in Fiji.

== Precolonial period ==
Similar to the faʻafafine of Samoa, the māhū of Hawaii, and the whakawāhine of New Zealand, Fiji has a traditional third gender population known as Vakasalewalewa. These individuals are assigned male at birth, but dress, act, and behave as women, and have traditionally been accepted by Fijian society.

Colonial historical records are silent on the role of Vakasalewalewa people in Fijian society. However, like many other gender identities in Oceania, such as akava'ine in the Cook Islands or fa'afafine in Samoa, these identities existed and were valued in pre-modern Fiji. Accounts indicate that before colonization, Vakasalewalewa people were an integral part of native Fijian society and that post-colonization stripped Fijians of their queer identities and conditioned them with homophobia, transphobia, and queerphobia.

== 20th century ==
=== 1997 ===
- Fiji codifies protection against discrimination based on sexual orientation into its constitution, becoming the second country to do so.

== 21st century ==
=== 2000s ===
==== 2001 ====
- Fiji adopts the ICD-10 classification, which contains codes for transsexuality in adulthood and childhood, which authorize the initiation of medical interventions for sex reassignment.

==== 2002 ====
- Fiji's marriage law is amended to prohibit same-sex marriage.

==== 2005 ====
- Consensual same-sex sexual acts are decriminalized in the 2005 case Thomas McCosker v. The State, where the High Court of Fiji quashed two convictions under sections 175(a), 175(c), and 177 of the Penal Code 1945, which criminalized "unnatural carnal knowledge" and indecent practices. The judge found these provisions unconstitutional, noting that while the law would not disappear as a result of the ruling, it would henceforth be "inoperative" for adults over 18 years of age engaging in consensual acts in private.

==== 2006 ====
- The Fiji High Commission in New Zealand confirmed that there is a policy against arresting gay men for consensual homosexual sex.

==== 2007 ====
- On October 2, the Employment Relations Ordinance was published. Section 6 of Part 2 prohibits discrimination based on "sexual orientation" in matters such as recruitment, training, promotion, working conditions, termination of employment, and other work-related matters. Section 75 of Part 9 also mentions "sexual orientation" as a prohibited ground for discrimination in employment and details the practices that constitute discrimination in the workplace in Sections 77 to 81.

==== 2009 ====
- The 1997 Constitution of Fiji, which explicitly protected against discrimination based on sexual orientation, is abolished.

=== 2010s ===
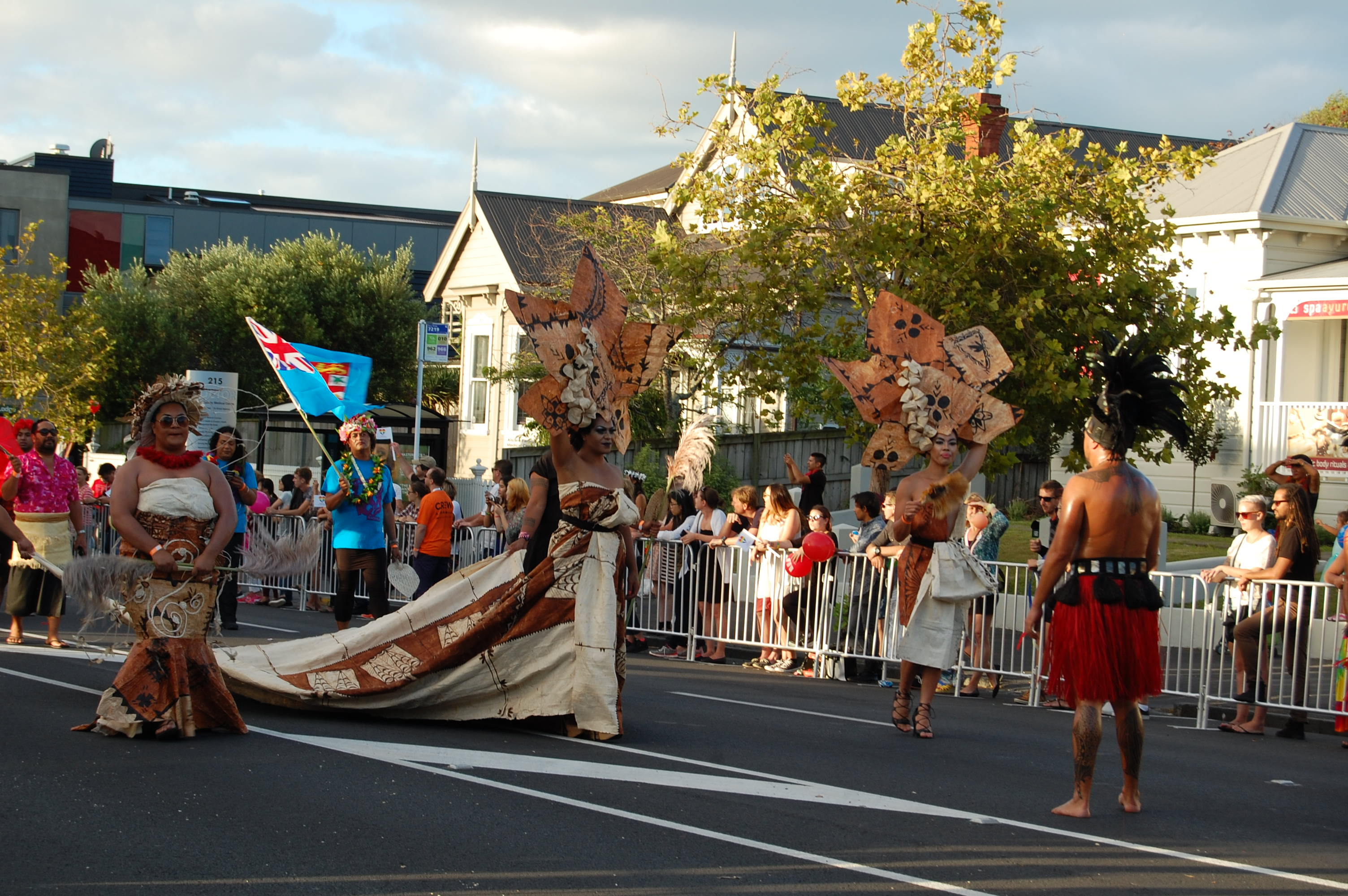
Marchers dressed in traditional Fijian clothing stand next to the Fijian flag during the LGBT Pride Parade in Auckland, New Zealand, in 2016

==== 2010 ====
- On February 1, Fiji legalizes homosexual activity by repealing the Penal Code that prohibited same-sex relations. At the same time, the age of consent of 16 now applies to all sexual relations, eliminating previous disparities that specifically affected same-sex relations.
- Indirect regulation of conversion therapies are introduced. Section 3(1)(d) of the Mental Health Act of 2010 (Decree No. 54) provides that a person shall not be deemed to have a mental illness simply for expressing, refusing, or failing to express a particular sexual preference or orientation. While this does not explicitly prohibit the practice of conversion therapy, it does prevent health professionals, such as psychiatrists, from legally engaging in these practices by diagnosing a mental illness based on a person's sexual orientation.

==== 2011 ====
- On February 4, the HIV/AIDS Decree (Decree No. 5) is published. Article 3(1)(a) of this decree prohibits discrimination based on sexual orientation, gender identity, and gender expression. However, this protection is limited and does not offer broad coverage in the provision of goods and services.

==== 2013 ====
- On September 6, then-President Ratu Epeli Nailatikau promulgates the Fiji Constitution. Section 26(3)(a) of this new constitution makes it unlawful to discriminate against a person on the basis of their sexual orientation or gender identity, among other grounds.

==== 2017 ====
- In April 2017, the Fijian Ministry of Health confirmed that gay and bisexual men are prohibited from donating blood.

==== 2018 ====
- The first LGBT pride march is held in Lautoka on May 17.

=== 2020s ===
==== 2022 ====
Divina Loloma becomes the first transgender candidate in a Fijian general election.

== See also ==
- LGBTQ rights in Fiji
