= Timeline of the future of the universe =

For timelines of the future of the universe, see:

- Timeline of the Big Bang
- Future of an expanding universe
- Timeline of the far future

== See also ==
- Chronology of the universe
- Timelines of the future
