= Timeline of the 1993 Battle of Mogadishu =

The 1993 Battle of Mogadishu, more commonly known as Black Hawk Down, was detailed by the U.S. Army and lasted from October 3 to October 4, 1993.

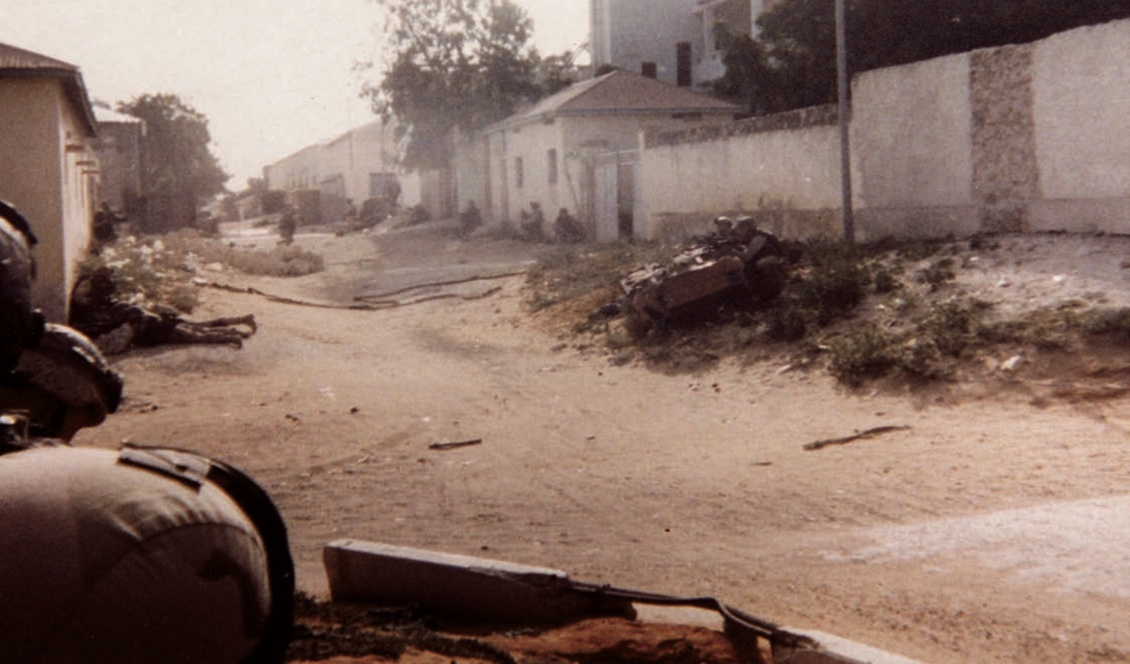
Task Force Ranger under fire in Somalia - October 3, 1993

A map of the main battle sites during the Battle of Mogadishu.

== October 3, 1993 ==
=== Afternoon ===
13:50 – Task Force Ranger analysts receive intelligence of Salad's location.

14:49 – Habr Gidr clan leaders, two principal targets, and the United Nations Corporation are located at a residence in central Mogadishu, Somalia.

15:32 – Force launches, consisting of 19 aircraft, twelve vehicles, and 160 men.

15:42 – Assault begins. 1st SFOD-D soldiers hit the target house. Four Ranger chalks insert via fast rope. A Ranger, PFC Todd Blackburn, misses the rope and falls 70 feet to the street, suffering severe injuries.

15:47 – Large crowds of Somalis begin converging on the target area.

15:58 – One of the vehicles, a five-ton truck, is hit and disabled by a rocket propelled grenade.

16:00 – Groups of armed Somalis from the city of Mogadishu begin converging on the target area.

16:02 – Raid targets captured: Assault force reports both clan leaders and about 21 others in custody. As the force prepares to pull out, three vehicles are detached to rush the wounded PFC Blackburn back to the base. SGT Dominick Pilla is killed as these vehicles return to base, becoming the first American fatality.

16:15 – The convoy is delayed due to confusion over whether it is the responsibility of Delta or the ground convoy to signal move out. The prisoners are eventually loaded after the Delta teams move the prisoners to the trucks.

16:20 – First helicopter crash: Black Hawk Super 6-1 is hit by a rocket-propelled grenade and crashes roughly four blocks north of the target building. Delta Force snipers SSG Daniel Busch and SGT Jim Smith survive the crash and begin to defend the crash site.

16:22 – Crowds of armed Somalis start racing towards the Super 6-1 crash site.

16:26 – Humvee convoy starts moving. When the prisoners are loaded up, the convoy and ground forces all begin moving towards the crashed helicopter. Black Hawk Super 6-4, piloted by Chief Warrant Officer Michael Durant, takes the place of Black Hawk Super 6-1 circling over the city.

16:28 – Search and rescue team ropes in to assist the crew of Super 6-1, the first crashed helicopter. Both the pilot and co-pilot are dead. The two crew chiefs, SSG Ray Dowdy and SSG Charlie Warren, are severely wounded.

16:35 – The Convoy makes a wrong turn and gets lost among the city streets, sustaining heavy casualties from Somali snipers and armed militia.

16:40 – Second helicopter crash: Mike Durant's Black Hawk, Super 6–4, is also hit by a Somali rocket propelled grenade, and crashes about a mile from the first crash site. Hostile crowds of Somalis begin moving toward it as well.

16:42 – After two previous requests had been denied, Delta Force snipers SFC Randy Shughart and MSG Gary Gordon, who had been providing cover fire by air, are inserted by helicopter near the Super 6-4 crash site to protect the injured Durant and his crew.

16:54 – The Lost Convoy, with more than half of its force either wounded or dead, abandons its search for the first downed Black Hawk and begins fighting its way back to Mogadishu Airport.

17:03 – A Quick Reaction Force convoy (a smaller, emergency convoy) is dispatched from Command and Control in an attempt to rescue the men stranded at Durant's crash site. It immediately encounters obstacles and heavy resistance.

17:34 – QRF and the Lost Convoy decide to return to base. Both convoys, having sustained heavy casualties, link up and abandon the efforts to break through to Durant. The remainder of the ground force of Rangers and Delta operators were converging around the first crash site, sustaining many casualties. Ranger CPL Jamie Smith is among those shot.

17:40 – Snipers Shughart and Gordon run out of ammunition and are killed when hostile Somalis overrun Durant's crash site. Every member of the crew are dead, except for Durant, who suffers a broken leg and an injured back. Durant is carried off as a prisoner by militia (He was eventually released to the Red Cross, 11 days later.) During Operation Gothic Serpent in Somalia, Durant was the pilot of helicopter "Super Six Four." It was the second MH-60L of two Black Hawk helicopters to crash during the Battle of Mogadishu on October 3, 1993. His helicopter was hit on the tail by a rocket-propelled grenade. That led to its crash about a mile southwest of the operation's target. (Both Gordon and Shughart received the Medal of Honor posthumously for their heroism in this action.)

17:45 – Both convoys return to base. Ninety-nine men remain trapped and surrounded in the city around the first downed Black Hawk. Corporal Smith is bleeding heavily. A medic requests immediate evacuation.

19:08 – Black Hawk Super 6-6 makes a daring resupply run, dropping water, ammunition and medical supplies to the trapped force. It is badly damaged, cannot land to evacuate Corporal Smith, and limps back to base.

20:27 – Ranger CPL Jamie Smith dies.

21:00 – Joint Task Force Command requests assistance from other commands. The Rescue Convoy, composed of two companies of American troops from the 10th Mountain Division along with the remainder of Task Force Ranger, Pakistani tanks and Malaysian armored vehicles, is formed at Mogadishu's New Port, and begins planning the rescue.

23:23 – The rescue convoy moves out, but as it approaches the crash site there is a large explosion which severely damages the convoy and makes the rescue almost impossible. However, a stockpile of rocket-propelled grenades in the city allows them to be used to great effect. A large proportion of the population is affected by power outages due to the Americans' destroying electrical substations in Mogadishu.

== October 4, 1993 ==
At Midnight 00:00 (24:00), the Rangers are still trapped inside Mogadishu without essential equipment, such as night vision devices.

01:55 — Rescue convoy reaches the trapped Ranger force. A second half of the convoy reaches the site of Durant's downed Black Hawk. Durant and his crew are missing.

03:00 — Forces are still struggling to remove the pinned body of Clifton "Elvis" Wolcott, pilot of downed Super Six One.

05:30 — Rangers start moving from the city to the Pakistani Stadium, on foot. Wolcott's body is finally recovered. Vehicles roll out of the city. Elements of the Rangers are left to run to a rendez-vous point on National Street, covering the vehicles whilst enduring gunfire during the exfiltration. The road they take is known as the Mogadishu Mile.

06:30 — The force returns to the Pakistani Stadium. 13 Americans are confirmed dead or mortally wounded, 73 injured, and 6 missing in action (5 are later confirmed dead, raising the death toll to 18, and 1 taken prisoner).
