= Timeline of LGBTQ history in Rwanda =

Timeline of LGBTQ-related history in Rwanda

This article is a timeline of notable events affecting the lesbian, gay, bisexual, transgender, and queer (LGBTQ) community in Rwanda.

== Precolonial period ==
- Prior to the European colonization of Rwanda and the arrival of Christian missionaries, homosexuality was socially accepted and practiced among the Tutsi population as a form of "spiritual empowerment".

== 21st century ==
=== 2000s ===
==== 2003 ====
- A new Rwandan Constitution is adopted. It introduces a ban on same-sex marriage in Article 26, stating: "Only monogamous civil marriage between a man and a woman is recognized."

==== 2004 ====
- The Horizon Community Association (HOCA) group is created, Rwanda's first LGBTQ+ activism organization.

==== 2009 ====
- In December, the Rwandan government halts an attempt to criminalize homosexuality in the country. The legal change was originally planned to be approved in Article 217 of the draft penal code and would include a five to ten-year sentence for persons found guilty of homosexual acts. However, the article was ultimately excluded from the bill after generating local and international backlash.

=== 2010s ===
==== 2011 ====
Map of countries based on votes in regards to the 2008 and 2011 UN declarations on LGBT rights. Rwanda voted in favor of the 2011 declaration.

- March 22: Rwanda becomes one of six African countries to vote in favor of the United Nations Declaration on Sexual Orientation and Gender Identity, condemning human rights violations against LGBT populations.

==== 2013 ====
- The coalition of LGBT organizations Isange Rwanda is created. At the time of its creation, it brought together three groups, and would reach 18 by 2021.

==== 2017 ====
- September 29: At a session of the United Nations Human Rights Council, Rwanda votes in favor of a resolution condemning the use of the death penalty as a punishment for people who have had homosexual relations.

==== 2018 ====
- In May, Rwandan President Paul Kagame meets in Kigali with American lesbian television personality Ellen DeGeneres and her wife, philanthropist Portia de Rossi.

==== 2019 ====
- July 12: Rwanda becomes one of the few African countries on the United Nations Human Rights Council to vote in favor of renewing the mandate of the Independent Expert on protection against discrimination based on sexual orientation and gender identity.
- August 26: Gospel singer Albert Nabonibo publicly announces his homosexuality, becoming the first artist of his kind to come out in the country. His coming out garnered a mixed response among his music peers and other public figures.

=== 2020s ===
==== 2020 ====
- The Church of God in Africa in Rwanda opens in Kigali, a religious temple open to the LGBTQ community.

==== 2021 ====
- In July, a LGBT Pride celebration takes place in Rwanda for the first time. The festival took place in Kigali and included a football match.

==== 2023 ====
- The non-profit organization Plan International Rwanda published the sexuality education book for adolescents Amahitamo Yanjye, which included information on sexual orientation, gender identity, and same-sex relationships presented in a non-judgmental manner.

== See also ==
- LGBTQ rights in Rwanda
