= Timeline of disability rights in Japan =

This disability rights timeline lists events relating to the civil rights of people with disabilities in Japan, including court decisions, the passage of legislation, activists' actions, significant abuses of people with disabilities, and the founding of various organizations. Although the disability rights movement itself began in the 1960s, advocacy for the rights of people with disabilities started much earlier and continues to the present.

== 1940s ==
- 1940 – The Race Eugenic Protection Law of Japan was submitted from 1934 to 1938 to the Diet. After four amendments, this draft was promulgated as a National Eugenic Law (ja:国民優生法, Kokumin Yusei Hō) in 1940 by the Konoe government. This law limited compulsory sterilization to "inherited mental disease", promoted genetic screening and restricted birth control access. According to Matsubara Yoko, from 1940 to 1945, 454 people were sterilized in Japan under this law.
- 1948 – According to the Eugenic Protection Law (enacted in 1948), sterilization could be enforced on criminals "with genetic predisposition to commit crime", patients with genetic diseases including mild ones such as total color-blindness, hemophilia, albinism and ichthyosis, and mental affections such as schizophrenia, manic-depression possibly deemed occurrent in their opposition and epilepsy. The mental sicknesses were added in 1952. The provisions also allowed for the surgical sterilization of women, when the woman, her spouse, or family member within the 4th degree of kinship had a serious genetic disorder, and where pregnancy would endanger the life of the woman. The operation required consent of the woman, her spouse and the approval of the Prefectural Eugenic Protection Council. The law also allowed for abortion for pregnancies in the cases of rape, leprosy, hereditary-transmitted disease, or if the physician determined that the fetus would not be viable outside of the womb. Again, the consent of the woman and her spouse were necessary. Despite the unambiguous wording of the law, the law was used by local authorities as justification for measures enforcing forced sterilization and abortions upon people with certain genetic disorders, as well as leprosy, as well as an excuse for legalized discrimination against people with physical and intellectual disabilities. In 1996, this law was replaced by the Maternity Protection Law, which eliminated the provision based on eugenics. In July 2024, the Supreme Court of Japan ruled that the Eugenic Protection Law was unconstitutional, and eliminated the 20-year statute of limitations for those affected by the law.

== 1970s ==
- 1970 – Disability activist Hiroshi Yokota (a member of Aoi Shiba no Kai) published the declaration of activity, "We Act Like This," in their journal Ayumi in 1970. It stated in full (with asterisks before each point replaced by dashes for clarity),

"- We identify ourselves as people with Cerebral Palsy (CP). We recognize our position as 'an existence which should not exist,' in the modern society. We believe that this recognition should be the starting point of our whole movement, and we act on this belief.

– We assert ourselves aggressively. When we identify ourselves as people with CP, we have a will to protect ourselves. We believe that a strong self-assertion is the only way to achieve self-protection, and we act on this belief.

– We deny love and justice. We condemn egoism held by love and justice. We believe that mutual understanding, accompanying the human observation which arises from the denial of love and justice, means the true well-being, and we act on this belief.

– We do not choose the way of problem solving. We have learnt from our personal experiences that easy solutions to problems lead to dangerous compromises. We believe that an endless confrontation is the only course of action possible for us, and we act on this belief." This declaration became an epoch making event in the Japanese disability movement. Later a fifth point was added, stating in full, "We deny able-bodied civilization. We recognize that modern civilization has managed to sustain itself only by excluding us, people with CP. We believe that creation of our own culture through our movement and daily life leads to the condemnation of modern civilization, and we act on this belief."

== 1990s ==
- 1994 – Since 1994, Japanese law requires buildings exceeding floor area of 2,000 square metres (22,000 sq ft) to install and maintain tactile pavings near stairs, ramps, escalators and major pathway. Schools, hospitals, theatres, arenas, community centre, exhibition halls, department stores, hotels, office, multidwelling units or senior homes with floor space less than 2,000 square metres (22,000 sq ft) must spend reasonable effort to install and maintain tactile pavings inside the building, but not required. The original law was replaced by another law in 2006 with wider scope including outdoor areas.
- 1996 – The Eugenic Protection Law in Japan was replaced by the Maternity Protection Law, which eliminated the provision based on eugenics.

== 2000s ==
- 2002 - The Act on Assistance Dogs for Physically Disabled Persons was issued in 2002. The stated goal of this act was to improve the quality of "assistance dogs for physically disabled persons" and expand the use of public facilities by physically disabled people. Assistance dogs are classified as either guide dogs, hearing dogs, or service dogs. Public transportation, public facilities, offices of public organization, and private businesses of 50 or more people are required to accept assistance dogs. Private housing and private businesses with less than 50 people are encouraged but not required to accept assistance dogs.

== 2010s ==
- 2016 - The Sagamihara stabbings were committed on 26 July 2016 in Midori Ward, Sagamihara, Kanagawa. Nineteen people were killed and 26 others were injured, 13 severely, at a care home for disabled people. Previously that year, the killer, who had worked at the care home, wrote a letter saying, "I envision a world where a person with multiple disabilities can be euthanised, with an agreement from the guardians, when it is difficult for the person to carry out household and social activities." He also wrote that the killings of disabled people would be "for the sake of Japan and world peace" as well as to benefit the global economy and prevent World War III.
- 2017 – Authorities released an official record showing that a girl was forcibly sterilized in 1972 because of her intellectual disability; an official of a civic group stated that this "must be the first disclosure in Japan of a record of an individual who underwent an eugenic sterilization operation."
- 2019 – Passing of a law promising to pay each person sterilized under the Eugenic Protection Law 3.2 million yen ($29,000) in compensation. Survivors had five years to apply for compensation, subject to approval by a board of experts.

== 2020s ==
- 2024: In July 2024, the Supreme Court of Japan ruled that the Eugenic Protection Law passed in 1948 was unconstitutional, and eliminated the 20-year statute of limitations for those affected by the law.
- 2024: Japanese Prime Minister Fumio Kishida formally apologized to 130 victims of forced sterilization under the Eugenics Protection Law passed in 1948, and approved compensation measures for at least 25,000 affected victims or their relatives.
