= Timeline of LGBTQ history in Lesotho =

Timeline of LGBTQ-related history in Lesotho

This article is a timeline of notable events affecting the lesbian, gay, bisexual, transgender, and queer (LGBTQ) community in Lesotho.

== Precolonial period ==
- In Basotho society, there were institutionalized homoerotic practices. Relationships were documented between younger men known as boukonchana (or inkotshane), and their older partners, called numa. The boukonchana performed tasks traditionally associated with women and engaged in intercrural sex. These relationships, also common among miners in South Africa, persisted until the 1970s. Among women existed the motsoalle bond, a personal and sometimes intimate long-term relationship that coexisted alongside other heterosexual relationships.

== 19th century ==
- Roman-Dutch law, in force in the Cape Colony and including the crime of sodomy, was imposed by a proclamation of the British High Commissioner in Basutoland, though the exact date is unknown.

== 20th century ==
=== 1970s ===
==== 1975 ====
- April 1: The right to change one's legal gender comes into effect through the Registration of Births and Deaths Act of 1973, provided that a registered medical practitioner certifies the change.

== 21st century ==
=== 2010s ===
==== 2011 ====
- The Child Protection and Welfare Act comes into effect, prohibiting discrimination based on sexual orientation in relation to diversion programs.

==== 2012 ====
- Lesotho decriminalizes consensual sexual acts between homosexual adults with the new Penal Code, which did not include sodomy among the sexual offenses listed in Article 52. Additionally, Article 2(2) of the Code establishes that no one may be prosecuted for offenses not explicitly set out in the Code itself or in other written laws, thereby nullifying customary law provisions that had criminalized homosexuality.

==== 2013 ====
- The first pride march takes place in Lesotho.

==== 2017 ====
- The first Miss Lesotho Gay pageant is held in May. Transgender actress and activist Napo Kalebe would go on to win.

==== 2024 ====
- The Labour Act of 2024 comes into effect, which prohibits discrimination, violence, harassment, and sexual harassment based on sexual orientation and gender identity.

== See also ==
- LGBTQ rights in Lesotho
