= Timeline of the Infighting in the Sinaloa Cartel =

This timeline of the Infighting in the Sinaloa Cartel covers the period from 9 September 2024 to the present day.

== September 2024 ==
=== 9 September ===
In the early hours of 9 September, Ismael "Mayito Flaco" Zambada Sicairos reportedly authorized coordinated operations against Los Chapitos, with senior field commander "El Comanche" issuing orders for synchronized attacks across Sinaloa, marking the onset of open hostilities between the rival factions. At dawn, a Mexican Army convoy encountered armed civilians in La Campiña, an eastern Culiacán neighborhood considered a stronghold of Los Chapitos. A firefight ensued, resulting in the death of a sergeant.

Violence escalated throughout the day, with additional clashes reported in nearby neighborhoods and in the Costa Rica area. Damaged vehicles were observed in Costa Rica following the fighting, while further confrontations were reported in southern Culiacán Municipality—an area associated with the La Mayiza faction—as well as in the neighboring municipalities of Badiraguato, Navolato, and Elota. By midday, a group of armed men briefly boarded a public bus, issuing warnings to passengers and the driver about further violence. During the day’s operations, authorities seized several armored civilian vehicles, firearms, and tactical equipment.

=== 11 September ===
On 11 September, two members of "Los Monguis", a group aligned with Los Chapitos, were killed in the Santa Fe area of Culiacán, reportedly by MZ/MF-aligned forces. Separately, a large formation of armed fighters was recorded near Quilá, Sinaloa, with footage showing that the group became engaged in fighting.

=== 12 September ===
The Durango-Mazatlán highway was closed in both directions following reports of burned vehicles, the placement of tire-puncturing devices, and other criminal activity along the route. On the same day, the U.S. Consulate in Hermosillo issued a security alert after receiving reports of vehicle thefts, gunfire, security operations, road blockades, burned vehicles, and highway closures in four municipalities in Sinaloa.

=== 13 September ===
The Mazatlán–Durango highway remained closed as authorities responded to reports of armed civilians and multiple pickup trucks traveling along the free road between Palmito and Concordia, Sinaloa, toward the Durango border.

=== 15 September ===
Five male bodies were found bound and piled along Mexico Federal Highway 15 at the southern exit of Culiacán. Separately, another man was shot dead in the municipality of Elota. Authorities also reported road blockades in Concordia and near the Mesillas toll booth on the Durango-Mazatlán highway, where a burning tractor-trailer was used to block traffic.

=== 27 September ===
During a visit to Sinaloa by President Andrés Manuel López Obrador and President-elect Claudia Sheinbaum, pamphlets bearing messages were dispersed from a small aircraft over several areas of Culiacán, particularly the Tres Ríos sector. Later the same day, a vehicle was found abandoned in southern Culiacán containing multiple dead bodies and bearing the spray-painted message "Bienvenidos a Culiacán".

=== 28 November ===
A blockade was reported on the Mazatlán–Culiacán highway near Elota, where at least five tractor-trailers were set on fire, blocking traffic in both directions. An additional burned vehicle was reported on the road to Potrerillos del Norote.

=== 30 September ===
Local police in Culiacán were removed from active duty after the Mexican Army seized their firearms to inspect permits and verify serial numbers.

== October 2024 ==
=== 2 October ===
President Sheinbaum ordered a change in regional military leadership, relieving General Jesús Leana Ojeda of his post as commander of the Third Military Region, which oversees Sinaloa and Durango. He was replaced by General Guillermo Briseño Lobera.

=== 18 October ===
Gunmen in two vehicles fired high-caliber rifles at the facade of the El Debate newspaper building in Culiacán. While no one was injured, several vehicles were destroyed.

=== 21 October ===
Mexican military forces clashed with armed members of the Sinaloa Cartel on the outskirts of Culiacán, killing 19 assailants and capturing Edwin Antonio Rubio López ("El Max"), identified as a senior lieutenant of the Mayiza faction. The Secretariat of National Defense stated the confrontation occurred after a military patrol was attacked and described the operation as self-defense. Authorities reported no military casualties and seized high-caliber weapons and armored vehicles.

=== 22 October ===
A narco-banner from Los Chapitos appeared in Culiacán, aimed at Ismael Zambada Sicairos, leader of the La Mayiza faction. The banner threatened to turn Zambada over to U.S. authorities and mocked him over the military operation leading to "El Max's" capture, claiming government support was on their side.

=== 26 October ===
On 26 October, a cooler decorated with bows and pizza drawings was found containing a severed head, allegedly of a Los Chapitos member, along with a message directed at the group.

=== 28 October ===
A small plane, reportedly linked to the Los Chapitos faction, dropped four bombs on Vascogil, Durango, a stronghold of the Cabrera Sarabia Organization, allies of La Mayiza.
