= Timeline of the killing of Trayvon Martin =

- Date: February 26, 2012
- Time: 7:09 PM EST (start)
- Location: The Retreat at Twin Lakes in Sanford, Florida, U.S.; 28.79295°N 81.32965°W
- Participants: George Zimmerman (shooter)
- Deaths: Trayvon Martin
- Charges: Second-degree murder
- Verdict: Not guilty

The following is a timeline of the events surrounding the death of teenager Trayvon Martin on February 26, 2012, in Sanford, Florida. Martin was shot and killed by neighborhood watch volunteer George Zimmerman during a physical altercation. Zimmerman was charged with second-degree murder in April 2012, and found not guilty on July 13, 2013.

== Chronology of events ==
=== February 2012 ===
==== February 19 ====
Trayvon Martin and his father Tracy travel to Sanford, Florida from Miami where they stay with Tracy Martin's fiancée. She rents a townhome in the Retreat at Twin Lakes development.

==== February 26 ====
CCTV footage of Trayvon Martin, minutes before the shooting, purchasing a bag of Skittles and an Arizona Watermelon can.

- At an unverified time, Martin walks from the home where he is staying to a nearby 7-Eleven.
- 6:24:18 PM – As shown by a store CCTV, Martin purchases a bag of Skittles and an AriZona Watermelon Fruit Juice Cocktail (often described in media and at protests as AriZona iced tea.)
- 6:54 – 7:12 – Martin has an 18-minute cell phone call with a girl reported to be his girlfriend. The call gets disconnected.

February 26 Zimmerman 7:09:34 PM call to police

- 7:09:34 – 7:13:41 – George Zimmerman calls the Sanford Police Department (SPD) from his truck; total time of the call is 4 minutes 7 seconds.
- 7:11:33 – Zimmerman tells the police dispatcher that Martin is running.
- 7:11:59 – In reply to the dispatcher's question, "Are you following him?" Zimmerman responds with, "Yes." Dispatcher: "OK, we don't need you to do that." Zimmerman: "OK."
- 7:12:00 – 7:12:59 – The girl calls Martin again at some point during this minute.
- 7:13:10 – Zimmerman says he does not know Martin's location.
- 7:13:41 – The end of Zimmerman's call to Sanford police.
- 7:16:00 – 7:16:59 – Martin's call from the girl goes dead during this minute. [the precise time surfaced during the trial, the call ends at 7:15:43, 1 minute and 12 seconds before the shot.]
- 7:16:11 – First 9-1-1 call from witness about a fight, calls for help heard.
- 7:16:55 – Gunshot heard on 9-1-1 call.
- 7:17 – The first officer on the scene, Officer T. Smith arrives by squad car at Retreat View.
- 7:17:40+ – Officer Smith arrives at the crime scene.
- 7:19:07 – Photo taken of Zimmerman's head injuries by a civilian bystander.
- 7:19:43 – Officer Smith takes Zimmerman into custody.
- 7:25+ – Sanford police take a photo of George Zimmerman in a squad car.
- 7:30 – Martin pronounced dead at the scene by a paramedic.
- 7:40 – Sanford Fire Department treats Zimmerman for his injuries.
- 7:52 – Zimmerman's arrival at police station recorded on video.
- 10:30 – Martin's father and his fiancée return to the townhome, realize he is missing, are concerned, but think he may be with a cousin.
- 11:21 – Crime Scene Tech D. Smith photographs Zimmerman's injuries and hands; uses Gunshot Residue Kit to collect GSR. Zimmerman's clothing taken as evidence after wife arrives with a change of clothes.

==== February 27 ====
- Approximately 1:00 AM – Zimmerman released (duration described as "five hours").
- 3:07 AM – Timestamp on SPD Initial Report on the incident.
- 8:39 AM – Martin reported missing by his father.
- Around 9:20 AM. – SPD informs Martin's father of the death of his son.
- Zimmerman obtains treatment from family doctor, record of injuries generated.
- Zimmerman reenacts events at crime scene with three SPD officers (voluntarily and without counsel) and is video-taped.

=== March 2012 ===
==== March 3 ====
- Trayvon Martin's funeral is held in Miami.

==== March 7 ====
- Reuters writes about the case; more national coverage soon follows.

==== March 8 ====
- Martin's father holds press conference criticizing SPD investigation.
- The Martin family creates petition on Change.org seeking to build public attention. The petition eventually reaches over 2 million supporters.

==== March 9 ====
- Benjamin Crump, attorney for the Martin family, announces he is filing a lawsuit to get the public records released.

==== March 12 ====
- Chief Lee states that "[T]here is no evidence to dispute Zimmerman's assertion that he shot Martin out of self-defense."

==== March 13 ====
- SPD announces case turned over to State Attorney Norm Wolfinger.
- NAACP sends letter to U.S. Department of Justice.

==== March 16 ====
- Audio of eight calls to 9-1-1 released.

==== March 20 ====
- U.S. Department of Justice announces investigation.
- Attorney Benjamin Crump reveals that Martin was talking on the phone with a teenage girl during the altercation with Zimmerman.

==== March 22 ====
- Bill Lee temporarily steps aside as Chief of Police.
- Wolfinger recuses himself from the case and Florida Gov. Rick Scott appoints Angela B. Corey, the state attorney for the Jacksonville area, to take over the case.

==== March 23 ====
- A lawyer for Zimmerman, Craig Sonner, announces that his client acted in self-defense.
- President Obama comments on the shooting: "If I had a son, he would look like Trayvon."

==== March 28 ====
- Lawmaker Rep. Bobby Rush, D-Illinois, wearing hoodie removed from House floor.

==== March 29 ====
- Special prosecutor Corey announces that she will not comment on the Martin case until further notice.

=== April 2012 ===
==== April 5 ====
- Florida State Sen. Chris Smith convenes task force to examine possible changes to the state's self-defense laws.

==== April 9 ====
- Corey decides against a grand jury for the case, eliminating the possibility of a first-degree murder charge.

==== April 10 ====
- Corey says she'll make an announcement about the case within 72 hours.
- At a news conference Zimmerman's attorneys, Hal Uhrig and Craig Sonner, announce they are no longer representing him and that they never met him in person.

==== April 11 ====
- Corey announces that Zimmerman is charged with second degree murder.
- Zimmerman turns himself in to the police and is taken into custody shortly after Corey's announcement.

==== April 20 ====
- At bail hearing lead investigator Dale Gilbreath states that they did not know who started the fight and have no evidence contradicting Zimmerman's statement that Martin attacked him first. Bail is set at $150,000.

==== April 23 ====
- Zimmerman is released on bail at 12:05 PM.
- Zimmerman attorney Mark O'Mara enters a not guilty plea on his behalf.

=== May 2012 ===
==== May 14 ====
- Defense is given discovery evidence, including 67 compact discs and a list of witness statements.

==== May 17 ====
- Prosecutors publicly release evidence in the case, including police and autopsy reports, witness statements, and surveillance videos.

=== June 2012 ===
==== June 1 ====
- Seminole County Circuit Judge Kenneth Lester Jr. revokes Zimmerman's bond due to concerns that the Zimmermans did not fully disclose their financial status, and orders him to the custody of the county sheriff within 48 hours.

==== June 3 ====
- Zimmerman voluntarily complies with Judge Lester's order that he return to custody at the John E. Polk Correctional Facility in Sanford, Florida to await a new June 29 bond hearing.

==== June 18 ====
- Special Prosecutor Angela Corey releases six phone calls Zimmerman made to his wife while he was in the Seminole County Jail.

==== June 20 ====
- Sanford Police Chief Bill Lee is fired.

==== June 21 ====
- Two 9-1-1 telephone calls are released that were placed by Tracy Martin, Martin's father, on the morning after the shooting.
- Mark O'Mara, Zimmerman's attorney, releases a round of discovery evidence on his client's web site. It includes audio, video and written statements that Zimmerman gave to police.

==== June 29 ====
- Zimmerman's second bond hearing focuses on both the shooting case and his alleged misleading of the court at his first bond hearing. Judge Lester doesn't immediately rule on the bond matter.

=== July 2012 ===
==== July 6 ====
- Zimmerman is released from jail one day after Judge Lester grants him bond again under stricter conditions. His bond was increased to $1 million and he must remain within Seminole County, Florida, while awaiting trial.

==== July 12 ====
- Prosecutors release another round of discovery evidence. The nearly 300 pages of evidence include information from an FBI investigation of Zimmerman in which people involved in the case and family, friends and associates of Zimmerman were interviewed.

==== July 13 ====
- Zimmerman's legal defense team files a motion to have Judge Kenneth Lester disqualified from the case. They argue that negative remarks the judge made about Zimmerman in his ruling on re-granting bond show bias and may affect Zimmerman's ability to get a fair trial in Lester's court.

=== August 2012 ===
==== August 30 ====
- Circuit Judge Debra S. Nelson is officially assigned the case.

=== June 2013 ===
==== June 10 ====
- Zimmerman's murder trial begins with the selection of 6 jury members.

=== July 2013 ===
==== July 13 ====
- Zimmerman is found to be not guilty.
