= Timeline of events in the 2007 Liberal Democrats leadership election =

This timeline of events in the Liberal Democrats leadership election, 2007 lists the events covering the period from Sir Menzies Campbell's resignation to the conclusion of the 2007 Liberal Democrats leadership election.

== 15 October 2007 ==
- Sir Menzies Campbell resigns as leader of the Liberal Democrats.
- Party President Simon Hughes, who contested the previous leadership election, announces he will not stand again for the leadership

== 16 October 2007 ==
- Timetable for the leadership election announced. Nominations opened for leader.

== 17 October 2007 ==
- Chris Huhne launched his leadership campaign.

== 19 October 2007 ==
- Nick Clegg launched his leadership campaign.

== 20 October 2007 ==
- Both leadership contenders spoke at a party conference in Berkshire.

== 27 October 2007 ==
- Official hustings meeting in Rugby.

== 31 October 2007 ==
- Nominations close for leader: candidates must have obtained the support of 10% of Liberal Democrat MPs and 200 party members from at least 20 local parties.
- Nominations closed at 16:00 (UTC+0) with Chris Huhne and Nick Clegg having been nominated.

== 3 November 2007 ==
- Official hustings meeting in Leeds.

== 7 November 2007 ==
- Official hustings meeting in Cardiff.

== 10 November 2007 ==
- Official hustings meeting in Edinburgh.

== 13 November 2007 ==
- Official hustings meeting in Bristol.

== 15 November 2007 ==
- The candidates take part in a special edition of Question Time.

== 17 November 2007 ==
- Official hustings meeting in Plymouth.

== 18 November 2007 ==
- Both candidates appear on the BBC's The Politics Show.

== 19 November 2007 ==
- Official hustings meeting in Worthing.

== 21 November 2007 ==
- Ballot papers are to be sent out to party members.
- Official hustings meeting in Cambridge.

== 24 November 2007 ==
- Official hustings meeting in Manchester.

== 27 November 2007 ==
- Official hustings meeting in London.

== 15 December 2007 ==
- Deadline for ballot papers to be returned by.

== 18 December 2007 ==
- Nick Clegg is announced as the new leader of the Liberal Democrats in a press conference chaired by Vince Cable and starting at around 2:30pm.
