= Timeline of the history of North Macedonia =

This is a timeline of the history of North Macedonia, comprising important legal and territorial changes and political events in the history of the Republic of North Macedonia.

To read more about these events, see History of North Macedonia.

== 20th century ==
Year	Date	Event
1990	20 September	25 amendments to the Constitution of the Republic are adopted, which make radical changes, including the introduction of a multi-party system.
1990	11 November	The first multi-party parliamentary elections are held.
1991	8 January	The first multi-party Assembly of the Republic is constituted, and Stojan Andov is elected as its president.
1991	25 January	The Declaration of Sovereignty of the Socialist Republic of Macedonia is adopted by the Assembly of the Republic.
1991	27 January	Kiro Gligorov is elected as the first president of the Socialist Republic of Macedonia by the members of the Assembly of the Republic; until then, the Republic has a presidency.
1991	20 March	The first government after the introduction of the multi-party system is elected, led by Nikola Kljusev, also known as an expert or technical government.
1991	7 June	Four amendments to the Constitution of the Republic are adopted, one of which removes "Socialist" from the name of the Republic.
1991	8 September	The Republic of Macedonia holds an independence referendum. 96% of those who voted, i.e., 72% of those who were registered to vote, voted "For."
1991	17 September	The Assembly of the Republic adopts a declaration confirming the referendum results for the establishment of the Republic of Macedonia as a sovereign and independent state. This is done because the referendum is consultative and not decisive.
1991	17 November	The Constitution of the Republic of Macedonia is adopted.
1991	19 December	The Declaration on International Recognition of the Republic of Macedonia as a Sovereign and Independent State is adopted by the Assembly of the Republic.

== 21st century ==
Year	Date	Event
2018	17 June	The Prespa Agreement between the Hellenic Republic and the Republic of Macedonia is signed, designed to end the nearly three-decade-old dispute between the two countries.
2019	12 February	Constitutional amendments are adopted, including an amendment officially changing the name of the state to the Republic of North Macedonia, in accordance with the Prespa Agreement.
2020	27 March	North Macedonia officially joins the North Atlantic Treaty Organization (NATO).
