= Timeline of strikes in 1964 =

Strikes in 1964

In 1964, a number of labour strikes, labour disputes, and other industrial actions occurred.

== Background ==
A labour strike is a work stoppage caused by the mass refusal of employees to work. This can include wildcat strikes, which are done without union authorisation, and slowdown strikes, where workers reduce their productivity while still carrying out minimal working duties. It is usually a response to employee grievances, such as low pay or poor working conditions. Strikes can also occur to demonstrate solidarity with workers in other workplaces or pressure governments to change policies.

== Timeline ==
=== February ===
- 1964 Essex Wire strike
- 1964 Jamaican broadcast strike, 97-day strike by Jamaica Broadcasting Corporation workers.

=== March ===
- Power dispute of 1964
- 1964 Wankie Colliery strike, in Hwange.

=== April ===
- 1964 Belgian doctors strike. 18-day strike by doctors in Belgium over a proposed health insurance law.

=== June ===
- 1964 Italian newspaper strikes, including strikes by printers and by journalists.
- 1964 Nigerian general strike

=== August ===
- 1964 Dunnville strike.
- 1964 Mount Isa Mines strike

=== September ===
- 1964 French dairy strike
- 1964 University of Buenos Aires strike. 6-week strike by staff at the University of Buenos Aires in Argentina, supported by student strikes, over wages.

=== October ===
- 1964 General Motors-Holden strike. Month-long strike by General Motors-Holden workers in Australia.
- 1964 Nigerian teachers' strike
- October 1964 Revolution in Sudan, including strikes.

=== November ===
- 1964–65 Mexican Medical Movement
- 1964–1965 Scripto strike

== Statistics ==
In the United States, the Bureau of Labor Statistics reported a total of 3655 work stoppages involving 1,64 million workers in 1964 (for a total of 22,9 million working days lost), with 18 of those being major work stoppages involving at least 10 000 workers. This marked the highest number of work stoppages since 1959, while remaining substantially lower than most years during the 1950s. According to the BLS, the number of work stoppages was split roughly evenly between manufacturing and non-manufacturing sectors, albeit with around two-thirds of day lost coming from the manufacturing sectors.
