= Timeline of LGBTQ history in Palestine =

List

This is a timeline of notable events in the history of the lesbian, gay, bisexual and transgender (LGBT) community in the Palestinian territories and among Palestinians more broadly.

Homosexuality is not criminalized in West Bank,where Jordanian law remains in force, but remains criminalized in the Gaza Strip under a British Mandate-era law. There are no anti-discrimination protections, and LGBT Palestinians in both territories have faced social hostility and, at times, restrictions or harassment from the authorities. Several Palestinian LGBT organisations, including alQaws and Aswat, operate from or across Israel and East Jerusalem as well as the West Bank, so parts of this timeline concern Palestinians outside the territories.

== 19th Century ==
=== 1858 ===
- During the Tanzimat reforms, the Ottoman Penal Code of 1858 omitted sodomy as an offence, decriminalizing it throughout the empire, including Palestine.

== 20th Century ==
=== 1936 ===
- Under the Mandatory Palestine, the Criminal Code Ordinance (No. 74 of 1936) criminalized "unnatural offences" with up to ten years' imprisonment. The code remains in force in the Gaza Strip.

=== 1951 ===
- The West Bank, annexed by Jordan in 1950, came under Jordan's 1951 Penal Code, which did not criminalize consensual same-sex conduct. Female same-sex conduct was never criminalized.

=== 1994 ===
- A presidential decision by Yasser Arafat kept in force the laws, applying in the West Bank and Gaza before 1967, so the Jordanian code continued in the West Bank and the Mandate code in Gaza.

=== 1998 ===
- A Palestinian national health program on HIV and AIDS was established, led by Dr. Ezzat Gouda of the Palestinian Ministry of Health, to address issues of sexually transmitted diseases.

== 21st Century ==
=== 2001 ===
- Palestinians from the West Bank, East Jerusalem and Israel began meeting under the Jerusalem Open House, an Israeli LGBT organisation. This grassroots project later became Al Qaws (Rainbow in Arabic).

=== 2002 ===
- Aswat (Arabic Voices) a group for Palestinian lesbians, was established in Haifa, Israel, initially within the feminist organisation Kayan.

=== 2007 ===
- Al Qaws formed as an independent organisation in November, with offices in Jerusalem and Haifa.

=== 2010 ===
- A report by the International Lesbian, Gay, Bisexual, Trans and Intersex Association (ILGA) underscored and confirmed the partial legal status of homosexuality in Palestine: it was legal in the West Bank, but remained criminalized in Gaza. No civil rights laws protecting LGBT people in Palestine from discrimination were found.[activists in support of the Palestinian cause in 2011 in Canada]

=== 2015 ===
- In Haifa, Israel, Aswat organized the first Palestinian queer film festival, "Kooz Queer Fest." In that same year, Palestinian artist Khaled Jarrar painted a rainbow flag on a section of the West Bank wall in protest against the lack of freedoms in Palestine; the mural was covered up shortly afterward by another group of Palestinians.

=== 2016 ===
- Mahmoud Ishtiwi, a prominent member of Hamas, was executed following accusations of homosexuality and theft, in the context of persecution of LGBT people in Gaza.

=== 2019 ===
- The Palestinian National Authority temporarily banned LGBT group gatherings in the West Bank, claiming they were "harmful to Palestinian values and ideals." The measure was in response to an Al Qaws conference in Nablus. The ban drew wide criticism, including from the Independent Commission for Human Rights, and was subsequently rescinded.

=== 2022 ===
- In October 2022, Palestinian police arrested a suspect in the beheading of Ahmad Abu Murkhiyeh , a 25-year-old Palestinian seeking asylum in Israel because of his homosexuality. At the time, it was reported that 90 Palestinians who identified with the LGBT community were living “as asylum seekers in Israel.”

=== 2023 ===
- Zuhair Relit, a Palestinian in Nablus, was killed by the armed group The Lions' Den, accused of collaborating with the Israeli army under alleged coercion related to his sexual orientation.
