= Timeline of LGBTQ history in Equatorial Guinea =

This article is a timeline of notable events affecting the lesbian, gay, bisexual, transgender, and queer (LGBTQ) community in Equatorial Guinea.

== 20th century ==
=== 1980 ===
- The Military junta led by Teodoro Obiang Nguema, who came to power through a coup that occurred the previous year, put back into force of the laws of the Equatorial Guinean colonial period, thus bringing the Law of Vagrants and Criminals back into force in the country. It was used in the following decades to silence LGBTQ+ people.

== 21st century ==
=== 2010s ===
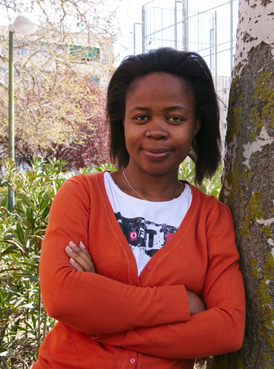
Melibea Obono in 2016

==== 2014 ====
- At a press conference in June, President Teodoro Obiang Nguema attacked sexual diversity and stated, "Africans do not agree with this system because it is an abominable practice that must be condemned."

==== 2016 ====
- Activist and writer Melibea Obono publishes the novel La bastarda, considered the first literary work from Equatorial Guinea to address sexual diversity as the main theme.
- The LGBTQ feminist collective We Are Part of the World is created.
- In July, the first public event in the country's history to highlight LGBTQ visibility is held. The event, held for International LGBT Pride Day, was called LGBT Cultural Expression Week and took place at the Cultural Center of Spain in Malabo.

==== 2018 ====
- Author Chris Ada publishes the novel Juntos antes que anochezca, Equatorial Guinea's second literary work after La bastarda to address homosexuality as the main theme.

==== 2019 ====
- The United Nations conducts a Universal Periodic Review to analyze the human rights situation in Equatorial Guinea. One of their recommendations is the adoption of laws against discrimination based on sexual orientation and gender identity.
- July 8: The government issues Decree 94/2019, calling for the passage of a law against prostitution and LGBTQ+ people. The document describes homosexuality as an "uncontrolled, exhibitionist, and propagandistic practice that undermines public culture and morality." Following the publication of the decree, the government launches a campaign of persecution and harassment against LGBTQ people.
- September 9: A female soldier is sentenced to one year in prison for having relations with another woman, based on the military penal code that Equatorial Guinea inherited from Spain under the dictatorship of Francisco Franco. She was subsequently tortured.

=== 2020s ===
==== 2023 ====
- July 12: The governor of Bioko Norte, León Elá Ondó, carries out a raid with the support of the police and other authorities on the facilities in Malabo of the LGBTQ organization We Are Part of the World.

==== 2024 ====
- January 24: The governor of Bioko Norte, León Elá Ondó, issues a decree prohibiting the formation of same-sex couples, considering that they can cause "public disorder" and "serious consequences" for society. The decree also authorizes law enforcement to "dissolve" gatherings of LGBTQ+ people.

== See also ==
- LGBTQ rights in Equatorial Guinea
