= Timelines of the Sudanese civil war =

The following are the available timelines for the Sudanese civil war (2023–present):

- Timeline of the Sudanese civil war (2023)
- Timeline of the Sudanese civil war (2024)
- Timeline of the Sudanese civil war (2025)
- Timeline of the Sudanese civil war (2026)
