= Timeline of the John F. Kennedy presidency (1963) =

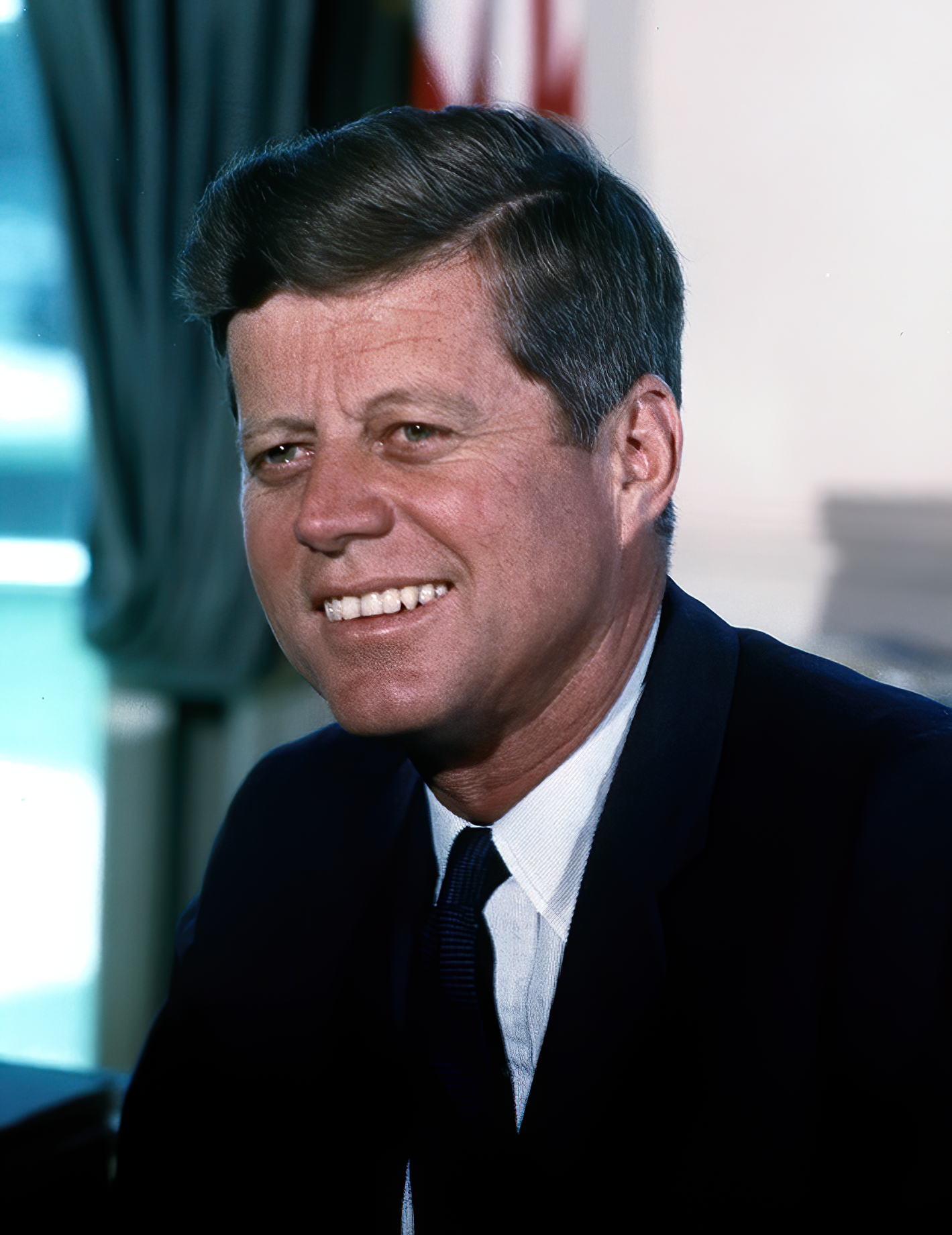
Kennedy in 1963

The following is a timeline of the presidency of John F. Kennedy from January 1, 1963, to November 22, 1963, upon his assassination and death.

== January ==
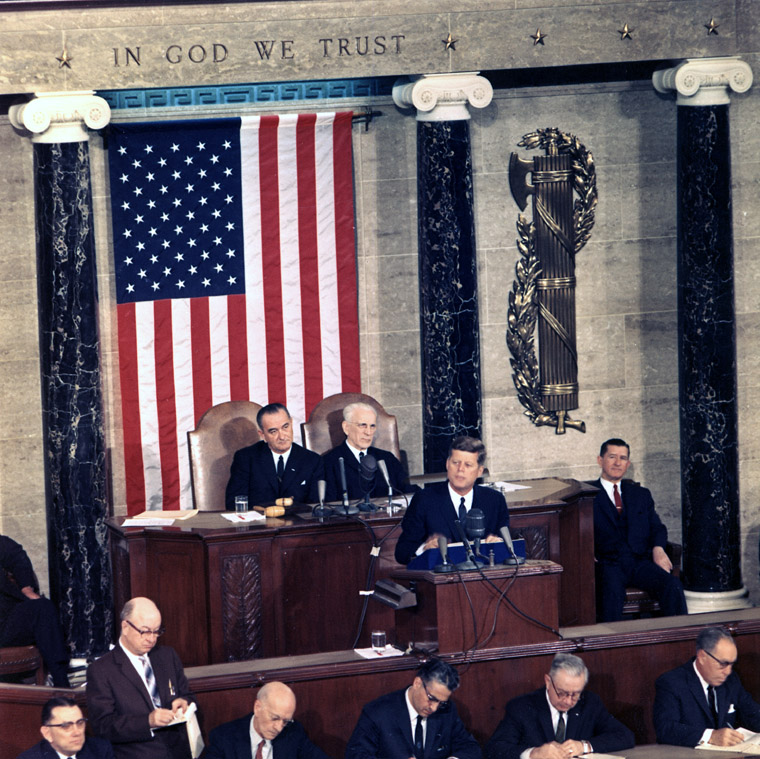
January 14: President Kennedy delivers his third State of the Union address.

- January 10 – President Kennedy meets with President-elect Juan Bosch of the Dominican Republic.
- January 11 – President Kennedy meets with Labor Secretary W. Willard Wirtz and AFL–CIO President George Meany.
- January 12 – President Kennedy announces the appointment of David L. Lawrence as Chairman of the President's Committee on Equal Opportunity in Housing. Kennedy also appoints Phil N. Bornstein as Federal Housing Commissioner.
- January 14 – President Kennedy delivers his third (and final) State of the Union address.
- January 31 – President Kennedy selects Franklin D. Roosevelt, Jr. for United States Undersecretary of Commerce. RFK denies government pressure is preventing Teamster union officials from getting their required bonds. President Kennedy sends a message to Capitol Hill for the government to pay the cotton trade to increase sales of domestic cotton alongside the government paying the feed grain and dairy farmers to not produce.

== February ==
- February 10 – The President and the First Lady attend the revue Beyond the Fringe in New York City.
- February 20 – In a letter to Attorney General Robert F. Kennedy, President Kennedy denies clemency to Victor Feguer, a convicted murderer.

== March ==
- March 15 – Victor Feguer is executed after Kennedy's February 20 denial of clemency. The execution marks the last federal execution until the execution of Timothy McVeigh on June 11, 2001.
- March 18–20 – President Kennedy makes the seventh international trip of his presidency, travelling to San José, Costa Rica, where he attends the Conference of Presidents of the Central American Republics.

== June ==
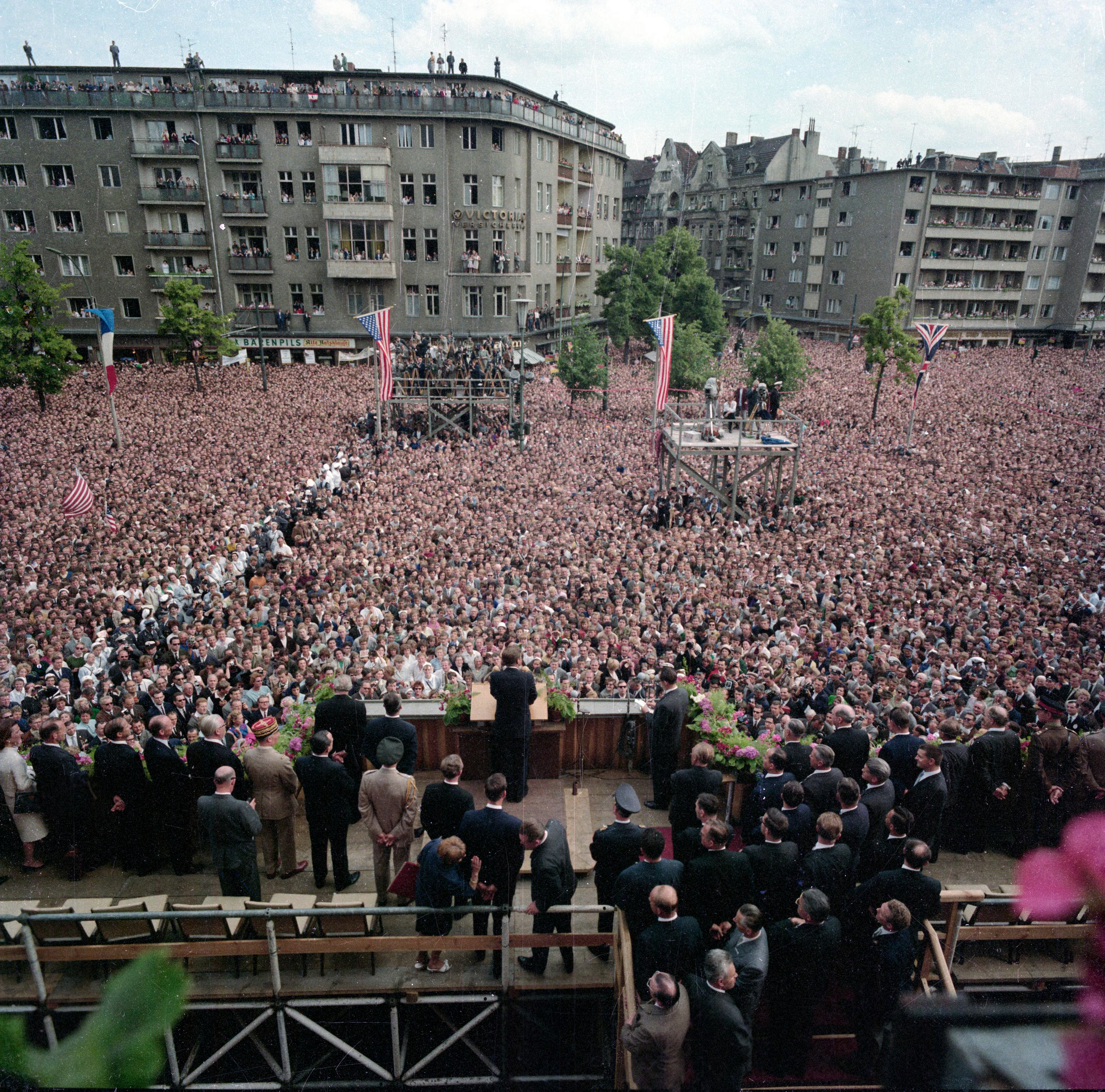
June 26: President Kennedy delivers his now-famous Ich bin ein Berliner speech.

- June 10 – President Kennedy delivers the commencement address at American University in Washington, D.C. This was the beginning of a series of speeches JFK made to promote peace with the Soviet Union. In the Peace Speech, JFK broke with tradition in two ways. First, by asking Americans to examine their attitudes toward Russians, and second by speaking about Russians as people, just like us. "And every thoughtful citizen who despairs of war and wishes to bring peace, should begin by looking inward--by examining his own attitude toward the possibilities of peace, toward the Soviet Union, toward the course of the Cold War and toward freedom and peace here at home... No government or social system is so evil that its people must be considered as lacking in virtue. As Americans, we find communism profoundly repugnant as a negation of personal freedom and dignity. But we can still hail the Russian people for their many achievements--in science and space, in economic and industrial growth, in culture and in acts of courage...We all breathe the same air. We all cherish our children's future. And we all are mortal."
- June 11 – President Kennedy delivers the Civil Rights Address in the aftermath of the Birmingham campaign and recent Stand in the Schoolhouse Door incident and further calls for legislation to enact a civil rights bill.
- June 23-July 2 – Kennedy makes the eighth international trip of his presidency.
  - June 23–25 – Visits Cologne, Frankfurt, and Wiesbaden, West Germany; also holds meetings with West German Chancellor Konrad Adenauer and other officials.
  - June 26 – Visits West Berlin and delivers his now-famous "Ich bin ein Berliner" speech advocating representative democracy and capitalism as a replacement for communist regimes around the world.
  - June 26–29 – Visits Dublin, Wexford, Cork, Galway, and Limerick, Ireland and visits his ancestral home; also addresses the Oireachtas (parliament).
  - June 29–30 – Travels to the United Kingdom for an informal visit with British Harold Macmillan at his home in West Sussex, England.

== July ==
- July 1–2 – Travels to Naples and Rome, Italy, where he meets with Italian President Antonio Segni, and NATO officials. Segni paid tribute to JFK for his Peace Speech and JFK reiterated it. Italy was in a hot debate about whether or not to make a center-left coalition with the Socialist Party and the Christian Democrats. The Christian Democrats had received monthly payments from the CIA to make sure communists did not win the elections since 1948, and the CIA was against this. Kennedy was for the center-left coalition, and the CIA undermined him by contradicting what he said to Italian leaders in the days following his visit.
- July 2 – Has an audience with the newly elected Pope Paul VI at the Apostolic Palace in Vatican City.
- July 24 – President Kennedy meets with a group of Boys Nation senators, including future U.S. President Bill Clinton, at the White House.

== August ==
- August 7 – Patrick Bouvier Kennedy, President and Mrs. Kennedy's third child, is born (five and a half weeks prematurely) at the Otis Air Force Base Hospital in Bourne, Massachusetts. Shortly after birth, he develops symptoms of hyaline membrane disease, now called infant respiratory distress syndrome.
- August 9 – Patrick Bouvier Kennedy dies at Boston Children's Hospital.
- August 28 – The March on Washington for Jobs and Freedom occurs in Washington, D.C., culminating in the now-famous "I Have A Dream" speech by Martin Luther King Jr. Estimates of the number of marchers range from 200,000 to 300,000. After the march, King meets with President Kennedy, alongside other civil rights activists.

== September ==
- September 20 – Address before the United Nations General Assembly (JFK's second) stating various specific recommendations to "move the world to a just and lasting peace".
- September 28 – Dedication of Clair A. Hill Whiskeytown Dam just outside Redding, California in Shasta County. Kennedy touted the reservoir as the largest of the Trinity County Dams" that "could be used to benefit the farms and lands further south."

== October ==
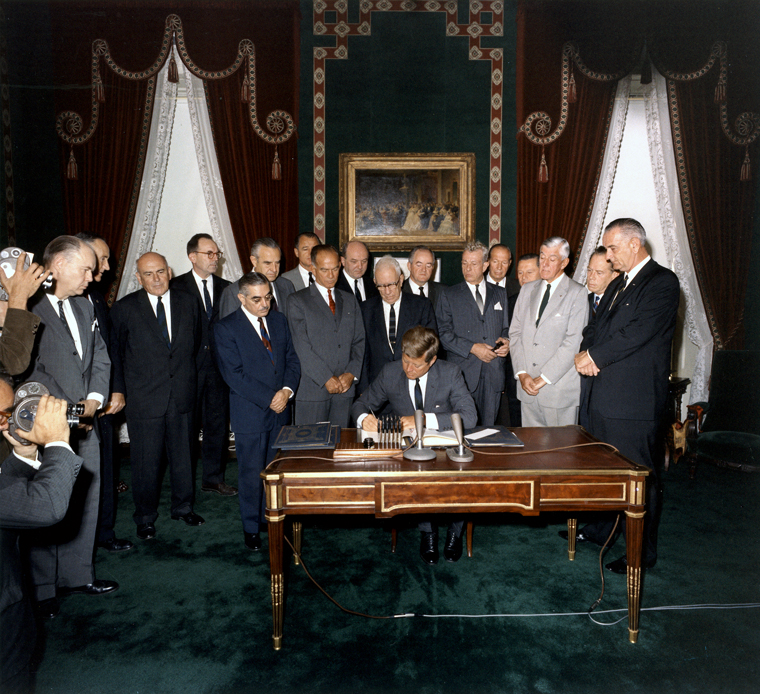
October 7: President Kennedy signs the Partial Test Ban Treaty, a major milestone in early nuclear disarmament in the Nuclear Age.

- October 3 – President Kennedy visits Cleburne County, Arkansas, to dedicate the Greers Ferry Dam. This is the last major public appearance before he was shot in Dallas.
- October 7 – President Kennedy signs the Partial Test Ban Treaty, prohibiting all nuclear weapons testing providing an exception for underground nuclear testing only.
- October 8 – President Kennedy announces an agreement with the Soviet Union to open negotiations for the sale of American wheat.
- October 11 – President Kennedy approves the recommendations made by Secretary of Defense Robert S. McNamara, and Chairman of the Joint Chiefs of Staff General Maxwell Taylor, and outlined in National Security Action Memoranda (NSAM 263, South Vietnam), to (1) conclude a complete US military withdrawal from Vietnam by December 31, 1965; (2) that the first of these troops, numbering 1,000, will have left Vietnam by December 31, 1963; (3) that a public announcement will be issued, to set these decisions in concrete.

== November ==
- November 2 - JFK travelled to Chicago for to campaign for reelection. The motorcade was cancelled because the secret service discovered a gunman named Thomas Vallee with a weapon in a high building near a sharp turn. A hotel reported to Cubans who had guns also, but the secret service botched that arrest.
- November 4 – In a private dictation at the Oval Office, following the assassination of South Vietnam President Diem, President Kennedy admits that the US Government had been discussing for three months the implementation of a coup d'état in S. Vietnam, with both dissenting and approving views, and which, at length, the plan to depose the leader of S. Vietnam had been authorised and approved by President Kennedy.
- November 14 – President Kennedy attends a dedication ceremony at the border of Maryland and Delaware marking the completion of the Northeast Expressway and the Delaware Turnpike, which together form part of Interstate 95 and provided a limited-access route between Baltimore and the approach to the Delaware Memorial Bridge. Both roads were renamed the John F. Kennedy Memorial Highway a month later following his assassination. On this same day, JFK privately informed Lyndon Johnson that he was not going to be vice president on the ticket. He told his secretary, Evelyn Lincoln that "he needed a vice president "who believes as I do."
- November 18 – President Kennedy travels to Tampa, Florida. There, he visited the military's Strike Command Headquarters, attended a luncheon at the officer's club, made a speech at the Florida Chamber of Commerce, and another to the United Steelworker's Union.
- November 21 – President Kennedy asks his economic advisers to prepare the War on Poverty for 1964. Less than two months after the President's assassination, President Johnson introduces the legislation in his first State of the Union address on January 8, 1964, and two of the major pieces of related legislation – the Economic Opportunity Act of 1964 and the Social Security Act of 1965 – are signed into law on August 20, 1964, and July 30, 1965, respectively.
- November 22 – President Kennedy and Texas Governor John Connally are shot at 12:30 p.m. CST (18:30 UTC) in Dealey Plaza, Dallas, Texas. They are rushed to Parkland Memorial Hospital, where Kennedy is pronounced dead at 1:00 p.m. CST (19:00 UTC). Lee Harvey Oswald is arrested and charged with the murder. Oswald is shot and killed two days later by nightclub owner Jack Ruby.

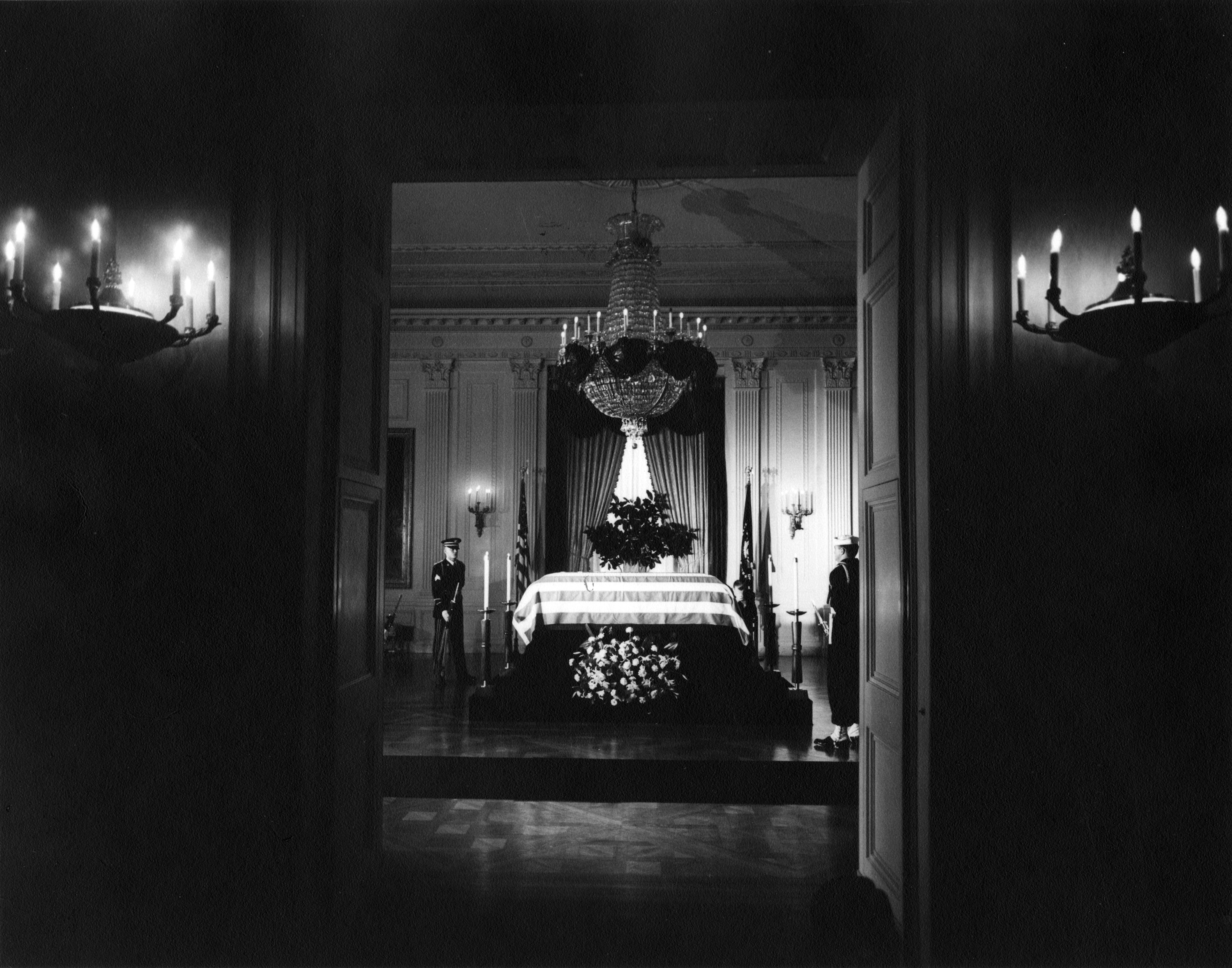
November 23: Kennedy lies in repose in the East Room of the White House.

- November 22 – Vice President Lyndon B. Johnson succeeds to the presidency and is sworn in aboard Air Force One.
- November 23–25 – State funeral of John F. Kennedy
  - November 23 – Kennedy lies in repose in the White House East Room for a period of 24 hours. At 4:45 pm, President Johnson issues Proclamation 3561, declaring November 25, the day of the funeral service, to be a national day of mourning.
  - November 24 – Kennedy lies in state in the Capitol rotunda for a period of 18 hours. NBC broadcasts live uninterrupted coverage of people paying their respects at the president's casket during the overnight hours.
  - November 25 – A funeral mass is held at St. Matthew's Cathedral commemorating the life of John F. Kennedy. Dignitaries from over 90 countries attend the service.
  - November 25 – President Kennedy is laid to rest at Arlington National Cemetery. Upon the request of the now-former First Lady Jacqueline Kennedy on the day before, an eternal flame, inspired by the Tomb of the Unknown Soldier at the Arc de Triomphe in Paris, known later as the John F. Kennedy Eternal Flame, is set up by the United States Army Corps of Engineers, and first lit by Mrs. Kennedy.

== See also ==
- Timeline of the John F. Kennedy presidency, for an index of the Kennedy presidency timeline articles

U.S. presidential administration timelines
Preceded by Kennedy presidency (1962)	Kennedy presidency (1963)	Succeeded by Johnson presidency (1963–1969)
