= Timeline of the John F. Kennedy presidency (1961) =

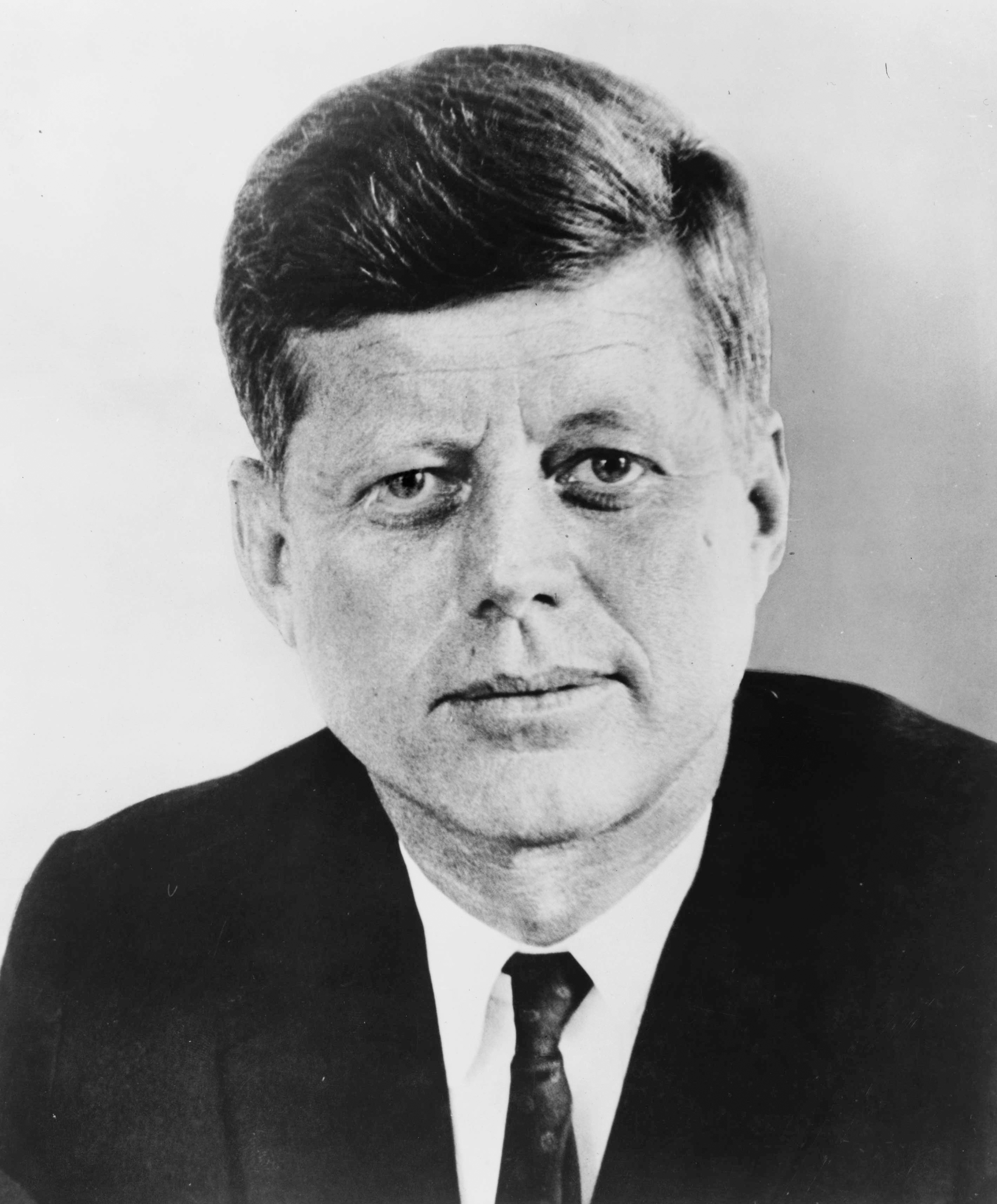
Kennedy in 1961

The following is a timeline of the presidency of John F. Kennedy from his inauguration as the 35th president of the United States on January 20, 1961, to December 31, 1961.

== January ==
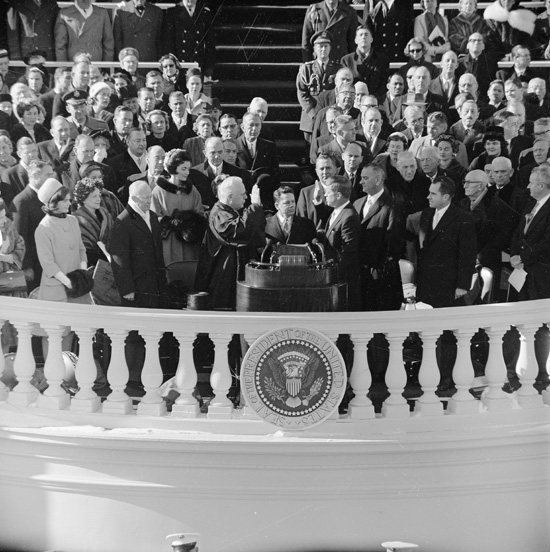
January 20:John F. Kennedy is inaugurated as the 35th president of the United States.

- January 20 – John F. Kennedy's presidency begins with his inauguration at the United States Capitol in Washington, D.C; the oath of office is administered by Chief Justice Earl Warren. President Kennedy delivers a widely praised inaugural address, asking Americans to "ask not what your country can do for you, but what you can do for your country" and for the people of the world to "ask not what America will do for you, but what together we can do for the freedom of man". He is congratulated by Soviet premier Nikita Khrushchev. Kennedy also formally nominates his cabinet and attends the inaugural balls.

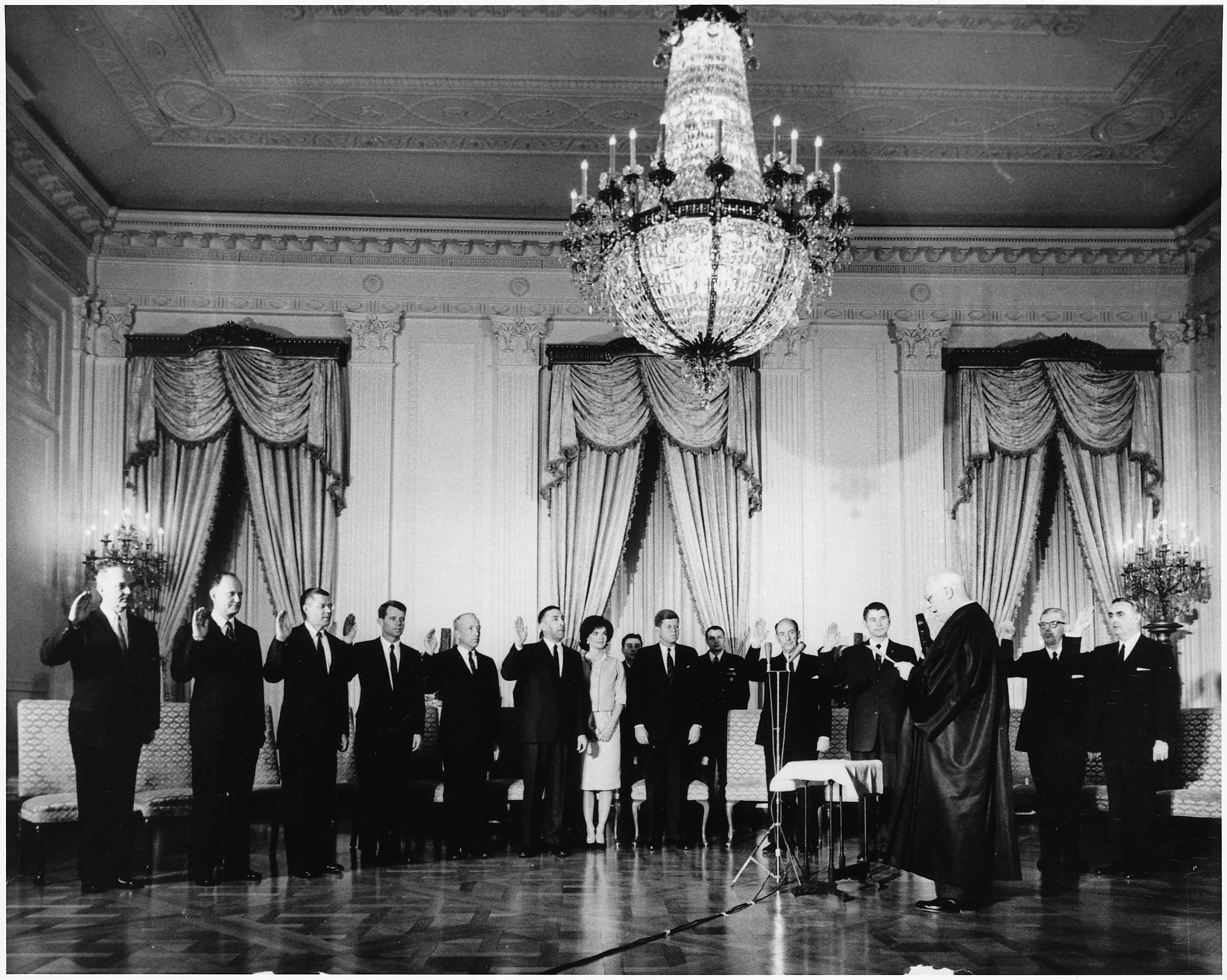
January 21:The Cabinet is sworn in by Chief Justice Earl Warren.

- January 21 – President Kennedy meets with former president Harry S. Truman and issues Executive Order 10914 directing a doubling of the quantity of surplus food distributed to needy families. Kennedy also attends a meeting at the Democratic National Committee and hosts the swearing-in of his cabinet.
- January 22 – President Kennedy meets with the poet Robert Frost. President Kennedy, Ted Kennedy, and Paul B. Fay attend mass at the Holy Trinity Catholic Church in Washington, D.C. Kennedy establishes the three-member Government Ethics Committee. Kennedy appoints Hickman Price Jr. and Roland Burnstan as assistant commerce secretaries.
- January 23 – President Kennedy meets with several defense, foreign policy, and intelligence advisers, including Defense Secretary Robert McNamara, Secretary of State Dean Rusk, National Security Advisor McGeorge Bundy, CIA Director Allen Dulles, and Chairman of the Joint Chiefs Lyman Lemnitzer. Kennedy nominates Frank Burton Ellis for a federal judgeship on the United States District Court for the Eastern District of Louisiana.
- January 24 – President Kennedy meets with then-former congressman George McGovern of South Dakota. He also meets with Democratic legislative leaders, and receives a tour of the shelter areas of the White House from Naval Aide commander Tazewell Shepard. He is presented plans for what would become the Food for Peace program and designates McGovern as Director.
- January 25 – President Kennedy holds his first regular live televised press conference in the State Department Auditorium. He announces the release of two surviving USAF crewmen by the Soviet Union after being captured when their RB-47 Stratojet was shot down on July 1, 1960.
- January 26 - Allen Dulles, the director of the CIA, sends a report to President Kennedy preparing him for a revolution in France that would overthrow the DeGaulle government, without including the CIA's long-time support for the rebels.
- January 30 – President Kennedy delivers his first State of the Union address to a Joint session of the United States Congress.

== February ==
- February 1 – President Kennedy holds his second presidential news conference; he announces the establishment of five pilot food stamp distribution projects. He later meets with economic and budget advisers. President Kennedy holds the first meeting of the National Security Council and sends a letter to Defense Secretary McNamara marking the scheduled launch of the USS Sam Houston (SSBN-609) the next day.
- February 2 – President Kennedy meets with NATO supreme allied commander Lauris Norstad, Joint Chiefs chairman Lyman Lemnitzer, and later with his cabinet. Kennedy appoints Burke Marshall as Assistant Attorney General for Civil Rights, David K. E. Bruce as Ambassador to the United Kingdom. Kennedy telegrams the mayors of 297 cities urging an increase in urban renewal activities.
- February 3 – President Kennedy meets with Ambassador to Laos Winthrop G. Brown. Kennedy and Paul B. Fay attend the movie Spartacus at the Warner Theater. After meeting with Health, Education, and Welfare Secretary Abraham A. Ribicoff, Kennedy orders money and surplus food totalling $4 million for Cuban refugees in fiscal year 1961.

== March ==
- March 1 – Emphasizing the theme of public service in his inaugural address, President Kennedy issues Executive Order 10924, establishing the Peace Corps on a "temporary pilot basis". Kennedy also sends to Congress a message requesting authorization of the Peace Corps as a permanent organization. President Kennedy holds his fifth presidential news conference. President Kennedy and Eleanor Roosevelt make a tape recording promoting the Youth Peace Corps. President Kennedy records a message for the American Red Cross. President Kennedy signs into law a joint resolution (H.J. Res. 155) to commemorate the 100th anniversary of the first inauguration of Abraham Lincoln on March 4, 1861 (PL87-1).
- March 4 – President Kennedy meets with Council of Economic Advisers chairman Walter Heller and later appoints Sargent Shriver to head the Peace Corps. He also dines at the home of his brother, Attorney General Robert F. Kennedy and meets with Ambassador to the United Kingdom David K. E. Bruce.
- March 13 – President Kennedy proposes the Alliance for Progress.
- March 24 – President Kennedy signs a commission restoring the five star rank general of the army position to former president Eisenhower.

== April ==
- April 1 – President Kennedy meets with Secretary of State Dean Rusk. Kennedy also declares parts of eastern Iowa flooded by the Cedar River to be a major disaster area.
- April 2 – President Kennedy meets with journalists Albert Merriman Smith and Marvin Arrowsmith. The First Family view the film All in a Night's Work.
- April 12 – The Soviet Union's launch of Yuri Gagarin into low Earth orbit aboard Vostok 1 marks the first time a human being is launched into outer space. Kennedy messages Soviet premier Nikita Khrushchev, congratulating him on the successful launch of Vostok 1.
- April 17 – Continuing a concept originating in the Eisenhower Administration, President Kennedy approves the invasion of Cuba in an unsuccessful attempt to overthrow the communist regime.
- April 18 - Around midnight the CIA and the military chiefs urge President Kennedy to use military force to save the invaders but Kennedy declines, having previously been told by the CIA that the invasion would work without military involvement.
- April 19 – The invasion of Cuba fails and results in a Cuban revolutionary victory, embarrassing Kennedy's administration and prompting him to say he wants to "splinter the CIA into a thousand pieces and scatter it into the wind."

== May ==
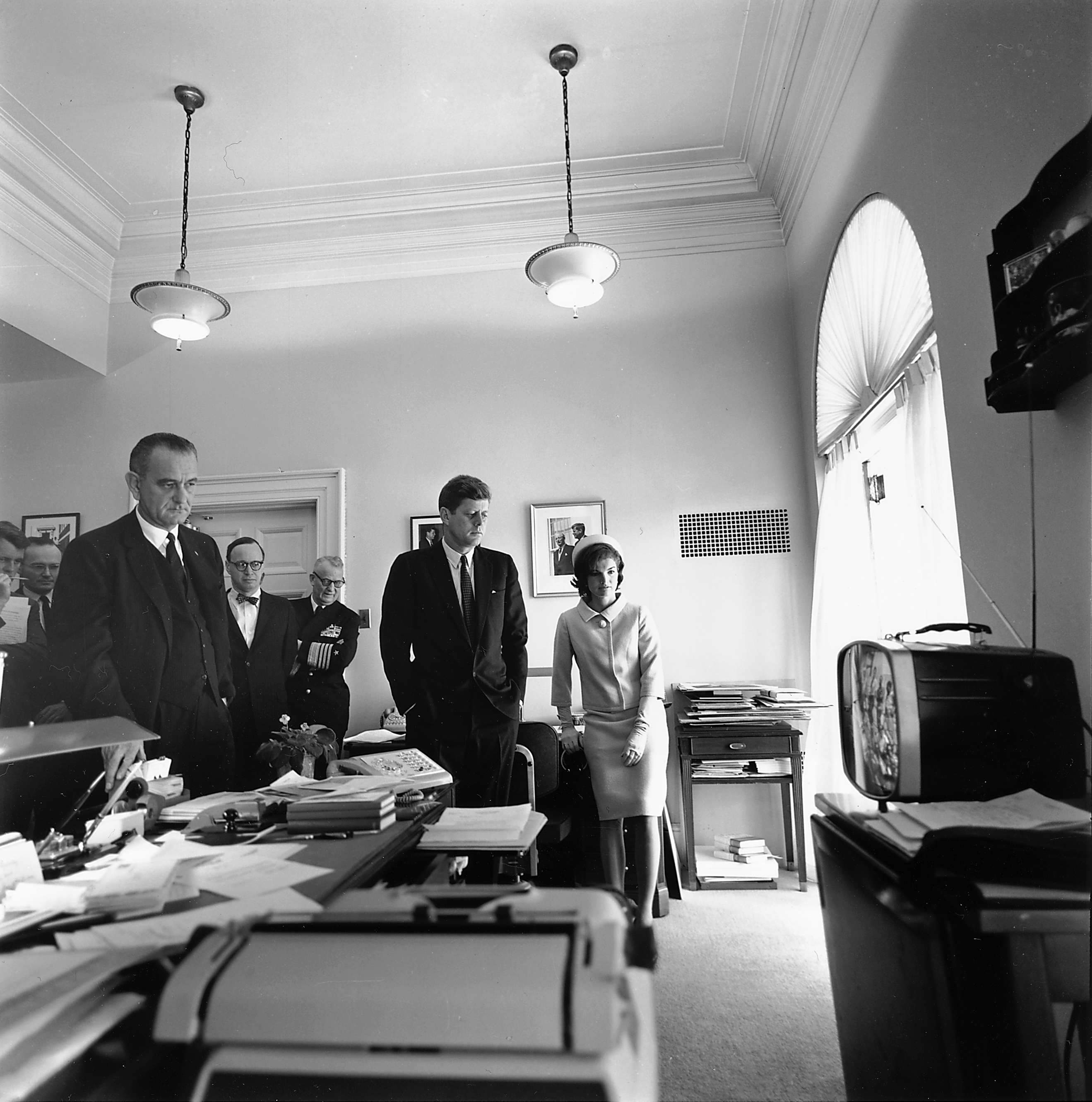
May 5: President Kennedy, Jackie Kennedy, and Vice President Johnson watch the launch of Freedom 7 from the office of his secretary, Evelyn Lincoln

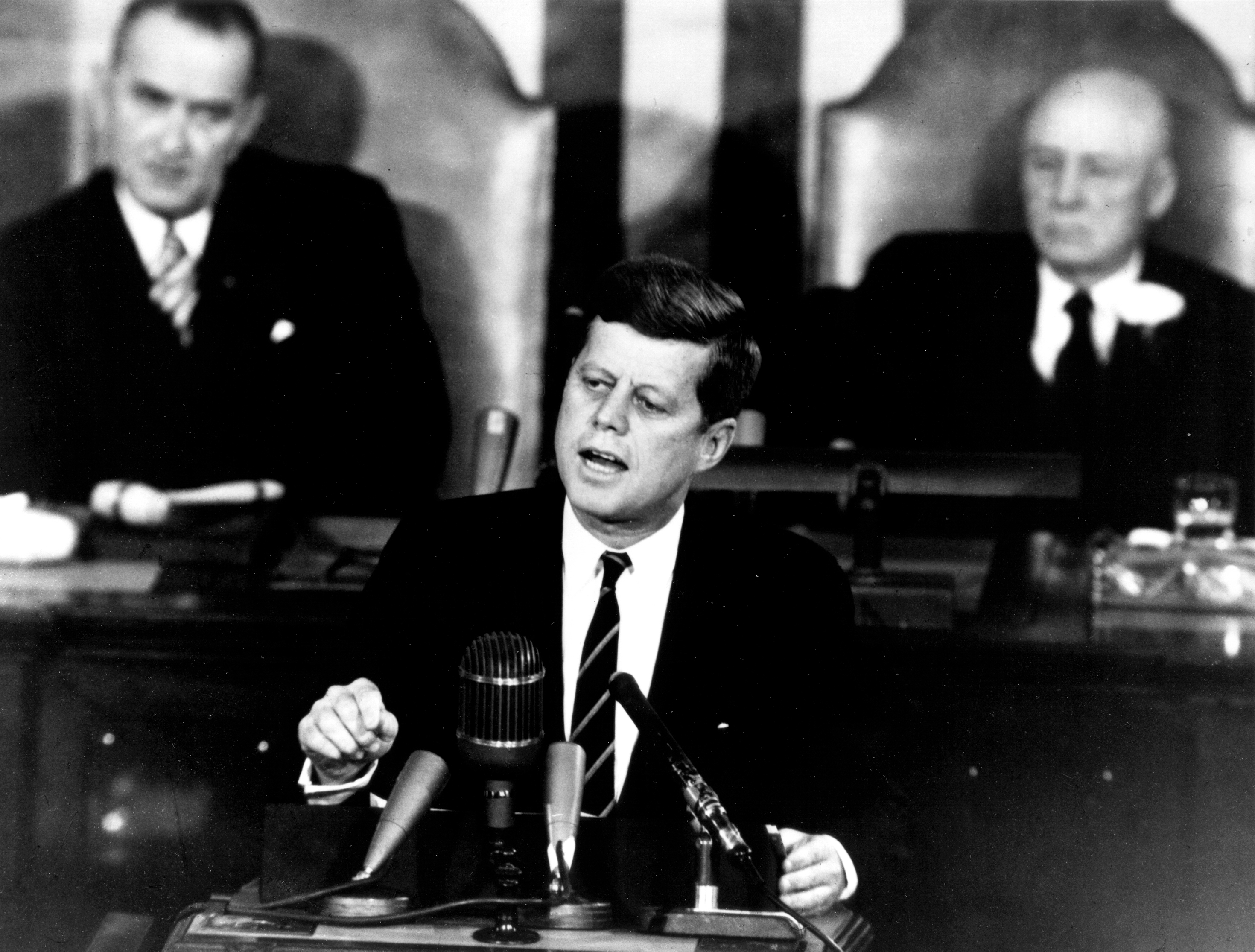
May 25: Kennedy lays out the goal to "land a man on the Moon and return him safely to the Earth".

- May 2 – The Freedom 7 spacecraft is readied for a launch attempt which would have resulted in the first American human spaceflight; it is canceled due to poor weather and rescheduled for May 5.
- May 5 – Alan Shepard is launched on Freedom 7 on a sub-orbital spaceflight aboard a Mercury-Redstone rocket, and becomes the first American in outer space. The flight lasts 15 minutes 22 seconds, and reaches an apogee of 187.42 kilometres (116.46 mi), and a maximum speed of 8,277 kilometres per hour (5,143 mph) (Mach 6.94).
- May 8 – President Kennedy meets with Alan Shepard at the White House, to congratulate him on becoming the first American in space. He awards him the NASA Distinguished Service Medal in a ceremony on the White House lawn. The six other Mercury Seven astronauts attend the ceremony, the next of which, Gus Grissom, would launch into space less than three months later.
- May 16 - The Taylor Committee presents its findings about the Bay of Pigs invasion to Kennedy. General Maxwell Taylor, appointed by JFK to head the official inquiry, dooms the careers of Admiral Burke and CIA Director Allen Dulles by putting the blame for the fiasco squarely on their shoulders. By November, the top three CIA, Dulles, Richard Bissel, and Charles Cabell would all be gone along with eventually 20% of the agency.
- May 16–18 – President Kennedy makes the first international trip of his presidency, travelling to Ottawa, Ontario, Canada, for a state visit. There he meets with Canadian governor general Georges Vanier and prime minister John Diefenbaker. On May 17, he addresses the Canadian parliament.
- May 25 – In an address to a joint session of the United States Congress, President Kennedy announces full presidential support for the goal to "commit...before this decade is out, to landing a man on the Moon and returning him safely to the Earth" and urges Congress to appropriate the necessary funds, eventually consuming the largest financial expenditure of any nation in peacetime. Though Kennedy had initially been convinced that NASA should attempt a human mission to Mars, NASA associate administrator Robert Seamans spent three days and nights working, ultimately successfully, to convince him otherwise.

== June ==
- May 31-June 5 – President Kennedy makes the second international trip of his presidency.
  - May 31-June 3 – Addresses North Atlantic Council, and meets with French president Charles de Gaulle in Paris, France. The topics discussed do not include the attempted coup against DeGaulle, nor the CIA's role in it. First Lady Jackie charms DeGaulle with her fluent French.
  - June 3–4 – Meets with Austrian president Adolf Schärf and has a summit meeting with Soviet premier Nikita Khrushchev.
  - June 4–5 – Visits with British queen Elizabeth II and prime minister Harold Macmillan in London, England.

== September ==
- September 25 – Address before the United Nations General Assembly (JFK's first of two) announcing the US intention to "challenge the Soviet Union, not to an arms race, but to a peace race".

== October ==
- October 30 – The Soviet Union detonates the Tzar Bomba, the largest nuclear weapon ever tested. In a press release issued by the Office of the White House Press Secretary the same day, the test is acknowledged as "in the order of 50 megatons, and called a "political rather than military act" and "the testing of this device primarily an incitement to fright and panic in the cold war".

== November ==
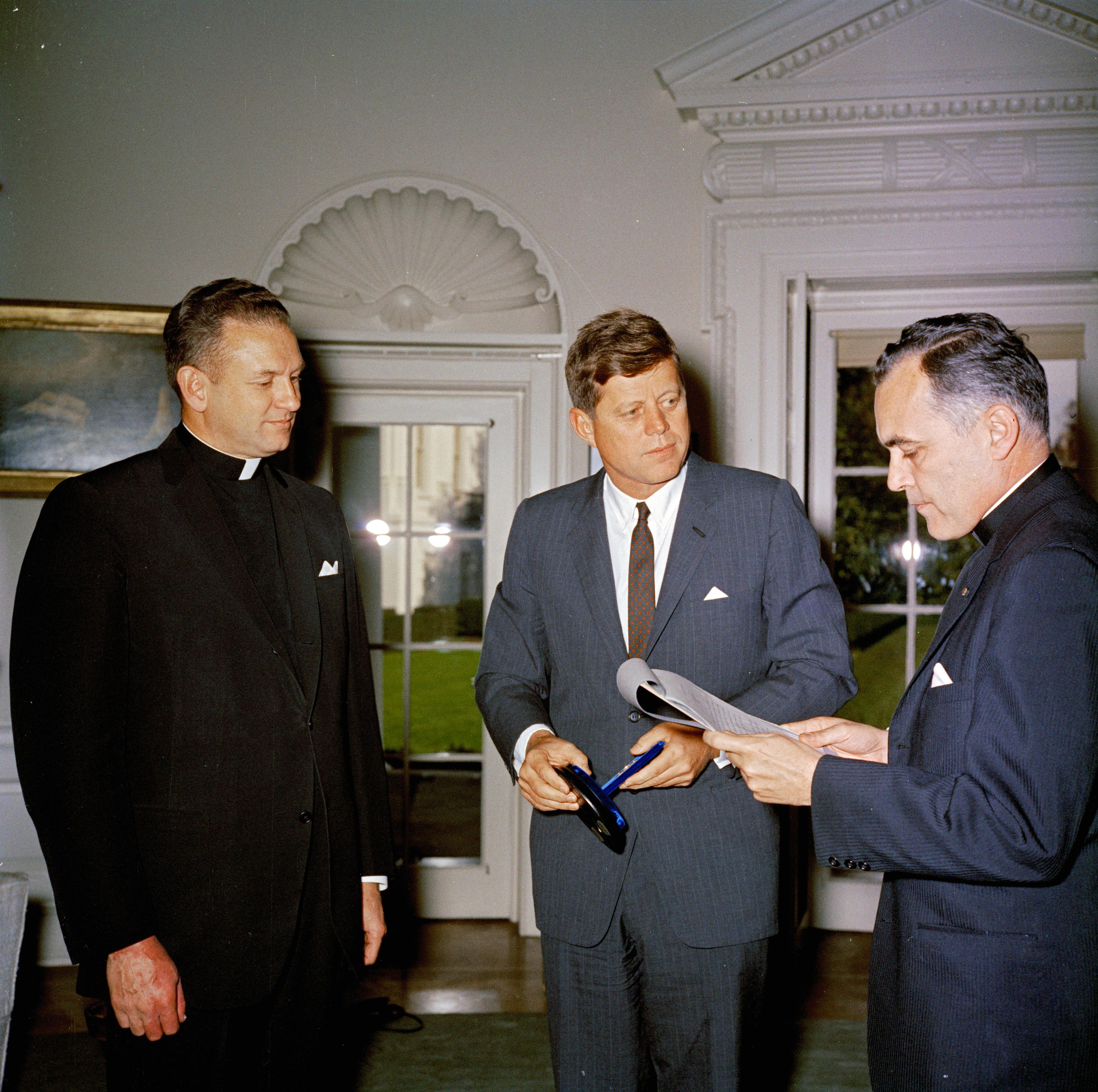
Rev. Theodore Hesburgh presents the 1961 Laetare Medal to President John F. Kennedy. Fr Edmund P. Joyce to the side.

- November 22 – Kennedy is awarded the Laetare Medal, the highest honor for American Catholics by the University of Notre Dame, with Rev. Theodore Hesburgh in attendance.
- November 28 - President Kennedy makes a speech and gives the National Security Medal to Allen Dulles at the CIA headquarters, an event which functions as his formal send-off. Despite the many retirements at CIA, the Dulles loyalists remain largely untouched.

== December ==
- December 16–17 – President Kennedy makes the third international trip of his presidency.
  - December 16–17 – Meets with Venezuelan president Rómulo Betancourt in Caracas, Venezuela.
  - December 17 – Meets with Colombian president Alberto Lleras Camargo in Bogotá, Colombia.
- December 21–22 – President Kennedy makes the fourth international trip of his presidency, travelling to Hamilton, Bermuda, where he meets with British prime minister Harold Macmillan.

== See also ==
- Timeline of the John F. Kennedy presidency, for an index of the Kennedy presidency timeline articles

U.S. presidential administration timelines
Preceded by Eisenhower presidency (1953–1961)	Kennedy presidency (1961)	Succeeded by Kennedy presidency (1962)
