= Timeline of the Harry S. Truman presidency =

The presidency of Harry S. Truman began on April 12, 1945, when Harry S. Truman became the 33rd president upon the death of Franklin D. Roosevelt, and ended on January 20, 1953.

== 1945 ==
=== April ===
- April 12 – Harry S. Truman is inaugurated as the 33rd president of the United States in a ceremony in the Cabinet Room, the oath being administered by Chief Justice of the United States Harlan F. Stone and completed exactly two hours and thirty four minutes after the death of Franklin D. Roosevelt.
- April 13 – Several labor unions in official and unofficial capacities pledge support for President Truman.
- April 14 – President Truman attends FDR's funeral. The White House announces President Truman's first press conference of his tenure will be held in three days.
- April 15 – President Truman attends Roosevelt's burial services.
- April 16 – President Truman addresses a joint session of Congress, during which he outlines his intentions of his tenure, including plans to win the war, carrying on the policies of the late President Roosevelt, and punishing war criminals.
- April 17 – President Truman delivers a broadcast address to service members in the United States Army and Navy, telling them that they shall carry a tradition of not faltering as done by his immediate predecessor and recalls his own service during World War I as having made him privy to both killing on the battlefield and the fighting man's trials and tribulations.
- April 18 – President Truman orders the Department of Commerce receive the transmission of the surplus property of the treasury procurement division. President Truman designates May 13 as Mother's Day in order to show what he calls the US's "gratitude, love, and devotion" for its mothers.
- April 20 – President Truman holds the second news conference of his tenure in his White House office.
- April 23 – President Truman, Prime Minister Winston Churchill and Marshal Joseph Stalin issue a joint statement during the evening, saying in part, "Any person guilty of maltreating or allowing any Allied prisoners of war, internees or deported citizens to be maltreated, whether in battle zone, on lines of communication, in a camp, hospital, prison or elsewhere, will be ruthlessly pursued and brought to punishment."
- April 26 – Press Secretary Jonathan Daniels requests White House reporters give President Truman equal protection to that received by the late President Roosevelt under the voluntary censorship code.
- April 27 – President Truman issues a statement saying the armies of Anglo-Americans have met Soviet Union forces in the "heart of Nazi Germany" and that the "enemy has been cut in two." President Truman holds his third news conference during the afternoon, announcing "Edwin W. Pauley as his Personal Representative on the Reparations Commission, with the rank of Ambassador, and of Dr. Isador Lubin as an Associate, with the rank of Minister."
- April 28 – President Truman holds his fourth news conference at the White House, during which he says there is "no foundation" for rumors relating to Germany surrendering, during the night hours.

=== May ===
- May 1 – President Truman issues a statement praising the office of Price Administration: "I suppose that OPA, like the rest of us, has made a few mistakes. But when we look at the whole record, I think that our price control and stabilization program has been one of the most remarkable achievements of this war."
- May 2 – Congress receives the first economy program from the White House in 12 years. It calls for a US$7 billion cut in funds for shipbuilding, the reduction of at least US$80 million in eight agencies' budget estimates, and announces the termination by June 30 of the civilian defense office.
- May 2 – President Truman holds the fifth news conference of his presidency at his White House office during the afternoon.
- May 3 – President Truman vetoes H.J. Res. 106, saying in part, "the legislation now passed by the Congress and presented for my approval would appear to have that result and to constitute a departure from the sound principle hereinbefore stated on which we have erected our military manpower mobilization system."
- May 4 – President Truman meets with President of the Philippines Sergio Osmeña for discussion on the Philippines becoming completely independent.
- May 4 – General Dwight Eisenhower announces the surrender of enemy forces in Holland and northwestern Germany and Denmark at Marshal Montgomery's 21st army group.
- May 5 – President Truman announces his willingness to "endorse and carry through to their conclusion the policies laid down by President Roosevelt respecting the Islands and the independence of the Filipino people."
- May 7 – President Truman says he cannot make an announcement about forces in Europe surrendering "until a simultaneous statement can be made by the three governments" in accordance with an agreement he made with the governments of London and Moscow.
- May 8 – Truman announces the end of the war in Europe via radio (V-E Day).
- May 9 – The office of war mobilization announces the return of American troops from Europe between 270,000 and 500,000 monthly and that reducing the number of soldiers there to 100,000 will take a year.
- May 10 – The State Department discloses personal representative of President Truman Samuel L. Rosenman has completed San Francisco, California conferences with Great Britain, Russia, and France.
- May 11 – The War Department announces plans for American involvement in the occupying of Germany, including that General Eisenhower will represent the United States on the four-powers control council for Germany.
- May 11 – On Mother's Day, President Truman is visited by his mother Martha Ellen Young Truman in her first trip to Washington.
- May 12 – President Truman is said by the Army and Navy Journal to have "opened the door" to Japan for peace by assuring that none of the country's people will be killed.
- May 13 – President Truman and his mother join service members in prayer at the chapel of the Bethesda, Maryland as part of a thanks for European victory.
- May 14 – Secretary of State for Foreign and Commonwealth Affairs Anthony Eden and Clement Attlee meet with President Truman.
- May 15 – President Truman holds a press conference in which he states his support for free press in Germany as well as the repeal of the Johnson Act. President Truman announces his nomination of Richmond K. Turner for full admiral. United States Secretary of the Interior Harold L. Ickes admits that he requested Congress validate federal surveillance of the late President Roosevelt's Hyde Park home while Roosevelt's family is not occupying it.
- May 21 – President Truman delivers a speech to Congress in regards to his presenting the Medal of Honor to James W. Lindsey.
- May 24 – President Truman issues a message to Congress about the executive branch's organization.
- May 25 – President Truman holds the eighth news conference of his tenure at the White House during the afternoon.
- May 30 – Special Envoy to the President Joseph E. Davies holds a series of conferences in London.

=== June ===
- June 1 – President Truman gives a joint address to Congress that entails his plan to bring about Japan's surrender that includes an army of 7 million and a navy of 3 million. President Truman holds the ninth press conference of his presidency during the morning in the White House.
- June 2 – Press Secretary Charlie Ross says President Truman has been notified of the change in schedule for the previously planned security conference in San Francisco. President Truman stresses the need for service members and other Americans to have food in a statement.
- June 4 – President Truman writes in a letter to House Speaker Sam Rayburn for an approbation to end the conflict with Japan.
- June 5 – President Truman abolishes the office of civilian defense, transferring all of its protective property to the Department of Commerce.
- June 6 – President Truman commutes the death sentence of Thomas H. Robinson, Jr. to a sentence of life imprisonment.
- June 7 – President Truman holds a news conference, his tenth since assuming the presidency, at the White House. Truman discusses foreign policy and taxes. President Truman says transportation issues are aiding in the US's victory within Europe and calls on Americans to "understand the situation and at once lend full cooperation in order that the burden may be minimized."
- June 18 – President Truman issues a statement on driver safety, saying in part, "By keeping his car in safe operating condition and by driving it with the utmost care, every motorist can help in relieving our serious transportation problem and thereby aid further in the whole war effort."
- June 19 – President Truman sends a message to Congress urging a change to the presidential line of succession: "In so far as possible, the office of the President should be filled by an elective officer. There is no officer in our system of government, besides the President and Vice President, who has been elected by all the voters of the country."
- June 21 – President Truman holds the fourteenth news conference of his presidency in the office of Governor of Washington Monrad Wallgren at the Legislative Building in D.C.
- June 23 – President Truman signs S. 502, authorizing subsidies payments and purchases during the upcoming fiscal year as well as set maximum limits on 1946 occurrences. President Truman says he signed the bill "because continuance of these subsidy payments is essential to assure necessary war output and to provide support for the stabilization program."
- June 26 – The United Nations Charter is signed in San Francisco.
- June 27 – President Truman holds a news conference, the fifteenth of his presidency, at Memorial Hall in Independence, Missouri during the afternoon.
- June 29 – The House passes Truman-backed legislation making the Speaker of the House after the Vice President in the United States presidential line of succession. French press reports President Truman wrote in a letter to De Gaulle that General Dwight Eisenhower would be ordered to give France coal from Germany.
- June 30 – Press Secretary Charles G. Ross announces the nomination of James Byrnes for United States Secretary of State by President Truman. Several Truman appointees, namely Clinton Anderson, Lewis Schwellenbach, Robert Hannegan, and Tom Clark, take over their respective departments.

=== July ===
- July 1 – Truman returns to Washington amid reports that he will discuss the topics of his recent overseas ventures and legislation calling for the US to participate in the world court. The document of the legislation is delivered to President Truman in the afternoon. The American group of the allied control council adopts a program meant to decentralize Germany by breaking it up into regions.
- July 2 – James Byrnes is confirmed for Secretary of State by the Senate.
- July 3 – President Truman issues a statement on the upcoming Independence Day: "Let us honor our nation's creed and liberty, and the men and women of our armed forces who are carrying this creed with them throughout the world."
- July 4 – The United States Navy announces a meeting has been held in San Francisco between United States Secretary of the Navy James Forrestal and high level officers within the Navy during the prior weekend on the ongoing war with Japan.
- July 5 – United States Undersecretary of War Robert P. Patterson reveals an unspecified number of American troops have been deployed to the Pacific, saying he could not reveal the exact number while in Washington.
- July 6 – United States Secretary of State Cordell Hull is discharged from the Bethesda Naval Hospital in Bethesda, Maryland.
- July 7 – The Department of War announces that 42 divisions which fought in either Germany or the Mediterranean are expected to return by the end of the year.
- July 8 – The Department of War releases the number of Navy branch service members either killed, wounded, or missing in action.
- July 9 – David Lawrence has his argument for Japan to surrender broadcast to the country by the office of war information.
- July 10 – The Department of War reveals new list of American army personnel liberated in Germany.
- July 11 – United States Under Secretary of the Navy Artemus Gates says over 17,000 Japanese planes have been obliterated by US forces since the Pearl Harbor attack.
- July 16 – The U.S. conducts the Trinity test at Alamogordo, New Mexico, the first test of a nuclear weapon.
- July 17 – Potsdam Conference
- July 18 – An appeal is made public that calls for President Truman to use US diplomatic and economic power during the Potsdam conference to support the fair elections in Poland and promised by Yalta after being presented at the White House for the purpose of relaying to President Truman. The appeal includes signatures from several notable individuals including Herbert Hoover, Alfred M. Landon, and John Dewey.
- July 20 – United States Secretary of Interior Harold L. Ickes announces intentions to send 6,000,000 tons of coal to Europe by the start of the following year.
- July 21 – President Truman, Winston Churchill, and Joseph Stalin hold their fifth three-hour meeting in Potsdam, Germany. An announcement, from the American compound, states the conference's work is going forward and "serious business" would be done.
- July 26 – The Labour Party win the United Kingdom general election by a landslide. The new Prime Minister of the United Kingdom Clement Attlee replaces Churchill at the negotiating table at Potsdam. The Potsdam Declaration is issued.
- July 28 – The Senate ratifies the charter that will secure the US joining the League of Nations in a vote of 89 to 2.

=== August ===
- August 2 – The Potsdam Conference adjourns. Allied leaders release a joint report on the Potsdam Conference simultaneously in Washington, Moscow, and London.
- August 4 – President Truman vetoes H.R. 3549, which would provide property to Norwich University. Of his decision to veto, President Truman says, "Individual enactments to provide relief in specific situations, or to govern special cases, which in effect are exceptions or amendments to the present law, it seems to me should be discouraged as detrimental to a sound public policy in a Government program of this character."
- August 6 – The B-29 bomber Enola Gay drops the first atomic bomb "Little Boy" on Hiroshima.
- August 8 – The Soviet Union declares war on Japan; the Soviet invasion of Manchuria begins about an hour later which includes landings on the Kuril Islands. The Japanese have been evacuating in anticipation of this.
- August 9 – President Truman says the allied forces are willing and determined in their quest for peace during a radio report. The B-29 bomber Bockscar drops the second atomic bomb "Fat Man" on Nagasaki.
- August 14 – President Truman holds the eighteenth press conference of his presidency at the White House, speaking and answering questions on foreign affairs in the presence of members of both his family and cabinet.
- August 15 – Surrender of the Empire of Japan announced.
- August 16 – President Truman requests the renewal of the war time no-strike pledge by organized labor. President Truman slightly relaxes wage controls to meet the reconversion period with expediency.
- August 17 – President Truman agrees to liquidate the lend lease program as quickly as possible following a conference with cabinet members.
- August 23 – President Truman holds the twentieth news conference of his tenure at the White House, discussing his administration's foreign policy.
- August 24 – President Truman releases a memorandum about the Veterans' Preference Act of 1944.
- August 25 – President Truman issues a statement concerning the twenty-fifth anniversary of the Nineteenth Amendment to the United States Constitution.

=== September ===
- September 1 – President Truman says, during the night hours via radio broadcast, that the following day will be "V-J Day" in reference to the surrender of Japan. United States Secretary of State James F. Byrnes pledges changes within Japan to allow for a government inclined to peace. The Navy announces its intention to release, through the demobilization program, 75,000 officers and 790,000 enlisted personnel by the end of the year. Assistant War Secretary McCloy holds a broadcast discussion where he alludes to the allied occupation in Germany being nowhere near ending soon.
- September 2 – The Japanese Instrument of Surrender is signed on the deck of the USS Missouri in Tokyo Bay.
- September 5 – President Truman says the White House meeting of the Roosevelt Memorial Association "was well attended, and the various proposals for memorials were discussed, and it was finally agreed to appoint a committee to nominate officers for the Roosevelt Memorial Association into an enlarged executive committee and to study plans and call another meeting to report back to the Executive Committee again" during the twenty-third news conference of his tenure in the afternoon.
- September 6 – The US Initial Post-Surrender Policy for Japan, which governs US policy in the occupation of Japan, is approved by Truman.
- September 12 – President Truman holds the twenty-fifth news conference of his presidency in his office during the morning hours.
- September 13 – President Truman commemorates the eighty-fifth birthday of John J. Pershing.
- September 19 – President Truman discusses demobilizing the military: "Between now and Christmas the discharge rate will steadily rise from the present daily figure of 15,200 to not less than 22,000 per day and by January, 1946, to more than 25,000 per day."
- September 20 – President Truman accepts the resignation of Henry L. Stimson as United States Secretary of War in a letter.

=== October ===
- October 1 – Harold Hitz Burton is sworn as an Associate Justice of the Supreme Court of the United States. United States Secretary of Labor Lewis B. Schwellenbach proposes that a binding decision in the oil strike be found by December 1 through an impartial arbitrator.
- October 2 – President Truman promotes the war fund as aiding active service members, giving health and welfare service to Americans within the US, and reliving patients affected by the war in liberated areas during a White House broadcast. The White House announces a postponing of a meeting with Georgy Zhukov due to the latter's illness. The House Military Committee approves legislation indicating President Truman award General George Marshall with a special gold medal.
- October 3 – President Truman sends a special message to congress announcing the beginning of talks with other nations about the use of atomic weapons to assure peace, and urges congress to hastily pass legislation authorizing the St. Lawrence river seaway and power project. Press Secretary Ross says the Palestinian situation remains in a "diplomatic stage" and that President Truman received a telegram from Prime Minister of the United Kingdom Clement Attlee on his desk the prior day during a news conference.
- October 11 – The House votes to pass the first tax cutting bill to have entered Congress in the past 16 years. President Truman tells Congress of a virtual exhaustion of the US$800 million that the US has contributed to international charity under the sponsorship of the United Nations.
- October 12 – Letters by President Truman, in which the latter assigns responsibility to a cabinet member for his reconversion program, are made public by the White House. Congressman Dewey Jackson Short says Congress intends to discover the truth behind the attack on Pearl Harbor during a Republican rally. President Truman gives the Medal of Honor to fifteen service members during a White House mass ceremony.
- October 13 – United States Secretary of Agriculture Clinton Presba Anderson says the recently created UN food and agriculture organization could contribute to the decline of the two thirds of starved individuals across the world while speaking in Washington, D.C.
- October 16 – President Truman publicly states the contents of his discussion with President of Chile Juan Antonio Ríos: "We discussed the mutual desire to strengthen the solidarity of the republics of the Western Hemisphere on the basis of the ideals for which the war was fought and won."
- October 18 – President Truman holds the thirtieth news conference of his tenure during the morning hours at the White House, speaking about American relations with Russia and domestic issues such as a Kansas district judgeship vacancy.
- October 27 – President Truman attends the commission of the USS Franklin D. Roosevelt in New York City during the morning.
- October 30 – President Truman conducts a radio broadcast on the economy as it relates to reconversion of the American dollar.
- October 31 – President Truman holds the thirty-second news conference of his presidency at his White House office during the morning, answering questions on his administration's foreign policy.

=== November ===
- November 1 – President Truman announces in a statement that "Ambassador Pauley and his staff will work in close cooperation with General MacArthur and his staff" to end aggression on the part of Japan.
- November 5 – President Truman delivers a speech at the Labor Management Conference opening session in the Departmental Auditorium during the afternoon.
- November 7 – The White House announces that in four days President Truman, Prime Minister of Britain Clement Attlee, and Prime Minister of Canada William Lyon Mackenzie King will hold a meeting on Anglo-American policy in regards to the atomic bomb while the three are on the USS Potomac (AG-25).
- November 8 – The House holds hearings on the draft of a peacetime conscription proposal by President Truman; these sessions last two hours before ending quickly by opposition in the house military affairs committee erupting while United States Secretary of War Robert P. Patterson is testifying for congress to adopt the proposal as a guarantee of peace within the world and national defense in the future.
- November 9 – President Truman signs a tax reduction bill of US$5,920,000,000.
- November 13 – President Truman sends a message to Congress on American involvement in regards to the United Nations Relief and Rehabilitation Administration.
- November 15 – President Truman holds the thirty-third press conference of his presidency in his White House office during the morning.
- November 20 – President Truman holds a news conference, the thirty-fourth of his tenure, at his White House office in the afternoon.
- November 28 – A letter is transmitted from President Truman that details the occupation of Germany to the Secretaries of State, the Navy, and War.
- November 29 – President Truman holds a news conference, the thirty-fifth of his tenure, addressing the administration's foreign policy.

=== December ===
- December 2 – Congressional sources reveal the Truman administration is spending US$82,000 of taxpayer money on a daily basis for the broadcasting of both swing music and news summaries to other countries.
- December 3 – The US military government office announces the ordered destruction of an additional eight German war plants.
- December 4 – The US Senate votes for the US to become part of the new league of nations as well as for President Truman to have authorization to send US troops to war for foreign nations without Congress's approval.
- December 5 – A bill advocating President Truman's fact finding and cooling off in industrial disputes recommendations is introduced in the lower chamber of Congress.
- December 6 – President Truman signs the Government Corporation Control Act, requiring budgetary programs be sent to the Bureau of the Budget on the part of corporations as well as submitting to the General Accounting Office their expenditures to the audit.
- December 7 – President Truman holds the thirty-seventh news conference of his tenure at the White House in the afternoon.
- December 10 – The Allies release a joint statement on wartime trade control removal during the morning.
- December 12 – President Truman holds the thirty-eighth news conference of his presidency in the morning at the White House, speaking about domestic issues such as appointments.
- December 15 – President Truman releases a statement calling for the cessation of hostilities be arranged between the armies of the National Government and the Chinese Communists and other dissident Chinese armed forces in order to bring about the unification of the country.
- December 17 – President Truman vetoes H. R. 1862, which he says in a statement "would extend preferential rank and retirement benefits to a particular group in one of the branches of our armed forces, and would not take into account the matter of rank and other benefits for personnel holding comparable assignments within other branches."
- December 18 – The House passes the United Nations organization bill in a vote of 344 to 15; Truman is now authorized to declare war without Congress's approval.
- December 19 – President Truman sends a message to Congress endorsing the possible creation of a department for national defense.
- December 20 – President Truman declares that boards dedicated to fact finding on investigative strikes should be allowed to examine the books of employers due to his belief that the earnings of a company are relevant to wage disputes.
- December 22 – During the night hours, President Truman calls on the US to allow immigration of at least 39,000 a year as part of a quota fulfillment.
- December 23 – President Truman issues a memorandum stating the reasons behind his displease with H. R. 4407, citing its effects on appropriations through reductions and breaking up of public employment offices.
- December 26 – During a press conference at his federal building offices, President Truman announces his legislative proposals will be revealed publicly during a radio address set to be conducted in the first week of the following month.
- December 27 – President Truman talks with William Southern, and members of the staff of The Independence Examiner at the newspaper's offices. Truman leaves in the night hours to return to Washington, concluding his Christmas vacation.
- December 28 – Truman meets with members of his family at the White House before signing 61 bills and leaving for a cruise intended to last five days.
- December 29 – Secretary of State Byrnes travels on the USS Williamsburg in order to give President Truman a report on his trip to Moscow.

== 1946 ==
- January 1 – United States Secretary of War Robert P. Patterson says the war department does not believe General Douglas MacArthur should be consulted ahead of the Japanese three occupation policies.
- January 2 – President Truman returns to Washington from his vacation.
- January 3 – President Truman urges the American people to confront their representatives for the passage of legislation he says will benefit the US in a post war period during a half hour radio address.
- January 4 – The US demands the entirety of the German general staff and high command be branded as war criminals for involvement in the Nazi program by the international military tribunal.
- January 5 – General Joseph T. McNarney announces his plans for policing American occupation zones, envisioning a task force of 38,000 men with armored vehicles that would patrol during the day and night.
- January 5 – The Labor Department reports prices resumed their upward trend at the end of World War II but adds that the average wage earner receives $4.43 less a week than needed to meet the rise in the cost of living.
- January 8 – During his forty-first news conference as president, conducted in his White House office during the morning, Truman states there is consideration for an increase in steel price. President Truman releases a statement on the reduction of armed forces members and explains the process by which this is conducted.
- March 4 – President Truman proposes that not approving the $3,750,000,000 loan to Britain could be "trade warfare between nations" following the loan being approved by the advisory board of the Office of War Mobilization and Reconversion.
- March 4 – The Senate Labor committee rejects the approval of the Case anti-strike bill developed in the House, chairman James E. Murray saying that members resented the enactment of legislation that they felt would penalize labor.
- March 4 – A special Senate-House committee recommends the elimination of over half of the current congressional committees as part of an effort to reorganize the government among an increase in congressional salary and a pension plan for congressmen.
- March 5 – Secretary of State Byrnes announces China has turned down efforts by Russia to collaborate on operating major industries in Manchuria jointly and the intent of the United States to send a message to Moscow regarding the affair.
- March 5 – A State Department official confirms a note being sent by Francisco Franco to confirm his intention of remaining in office despite allied pressure.
- March 5 – Former President Herbert Hoover is announced by Secretary of Agriculture Anderson to have accepted an invitation by President Truman to travel abroad to Europe for the purpose of surveying food needs in the continent.
- March 5 – The Senate Committee on Public Lands and Surveys unanimously recommends the confirmation of Julius A. Krug as Secretary of the Interior after the nominee was called up for questioning.
- March 5 – House Republicans put forth their own substitute for the Truman administration's battered-down housing bill which if enacted would deny the government the ability to clamp price ceilings on new homes.
- June 1 – President Truman accepts an honorary degree from Washington College in Chestertown, Maryland.
- June 14 – President Truman holds a news conference in which he confirms Myron Charles Taylor will remain his ambassador to the Vatican until world peace is secured. President Truman vetoes legislation promoting navy, marine corps, and coast guard personnel who had previously been prisoners of war.
- July 15 – Truman signs a bill authorizing a loan of $3.75 billion to Great Britain.
- October 15 – Two hours before his scheduled execution, Hermann Göring commits suicide.
- November 15 – President Truman announces that President of the United Mine Workers John L. Lewis has turned down a proposal for settlement of the coal wage dispute, Truman calling for a reconsideration for what he termed a "fair and equitable" proposal by the federal government.
- November 30 – A check discloses Truman has support from Democrats and Republicans in discussions with United Mine Workers President Lewis without making compromises that may seem akin to a victory for Lewis.
- November 30 – United States Secretary of War Robert P. Patterson states prices needed to meet American occupation army expenses throughout the first six months of the following year.

== 1947 ==
- March 12 – Truman delivers his "Truman Doctrine" speech to Congress, asking for a $400 million appropriation to fight the spread of Communism in Greece and Turkey.
- May 22 – Truman approves a bill providing $400 million in assistance to Greece and Turkey.
- November 4 – The United States proposes withdrawing American and Soviet-occupation armies within 90 days following the formation of an elected and independent Korean government the following year in a United Nations resolution.
- November 4 – Undersecretary of the Treasury Lee M. Wiggins says he has no particular advice to give revising tax treatment of farm cooperatives while speaking to the House Ways and Means committee.

== 1948 ==
=== January ===
- January 2 – The United States and France sign a treaty accepting the conditions put forth by the US Congress that would allocate 522,000,000 dollars in winter aid to the latter country alongside Italy and Austria.
- January 3 – President Truman tasks four agencies with forming allocating programs that are voluntary and industry wide for scarcity items.
- January 6 – President Truman holds a meeting with his Cabinet at the White House during the afternoon.
- January 7 – President Truman delivers the 1948 State of the Union Address.
- January 8 – United States Secretary of State George Marshall says Russia and the Communist Party will attempt a backfire on the European Recovery Program but also of his conviction that the US would be able to handle the opposition successfully.
- January 9 – The United States Navy announces four of its fleet-type submarines are being supplied to Turkey under the American program for strengthening Turkey against Russia.
- January 12 – The Federal Bureau of Investigation announces the resignations of eleven individuals from government service during their ongoing investigation by the FBI under the federal loyalty program.
- January 12 – President Truman sends Congress a peacetime budget providing billions for the funding of defense that would also be used to counter totalitarianism abroad.
- January 15 – The Interior Department states its expectation that President Truman will direct conservation of petroleum supplies by each government agency to assist with relieving the critical fuel shortage within the following twenty-four hours.
- January 16 – In a letter to Senator John Chandler Gurney, President Truman describes the Senate Armed Services Committee as having done a disservice to the United States after voting against legislation allowing Laurence S. Kuter to serve as Chairman of the Civil Aeronautics Board while receiving military pay.
- January 16 – Senate Foreign Relations committee chairman Arthur Vandenberg indicates opposition to the European Recovery Program would be diminished in the event the United States could follow its funding and see where it was being used.
- January 16 – United States Secretary of the Treasury John Wesley Snyder gives an ultimatum from the Truman administration to Congress during an appearance before the House Ways and Means Committee.
- January 16 – In a statement, United States Secretary of the Interior Julius Albert Krug endorses hydroelectric projects as a partial means of answering the national petroleum shortage problem.

=== February ===
- February 9 – President Truman requests Congress extend authorization for the federal aid highway program through mid-1951 at an annual rate of 500 million during a message.
- February 9 – The White House announces President Truman will leave Washington for a trip to Puerto Rico, the Virgin Islands, and Cuba on February 20.
- February 9 – The House Expenditures committee rejected the Labor Department having the United States Employment Service and the Bureau of Employment Security transferred into it.

=== June ===
- June 9-10 – Truman campaigns across Washington, delivering speeches in Spokane, Seattle and Olympia.
- June 25 – Truman signs the Displaced Persons Act authorizing admission into the United States of 205,000 European displaced persons over the following two years.
- June 26 – Truman orders an airlift of supplies into Berlin, in conjunction with the British, in answer to a Russian blockade of the portion of that city occupied by the Western powers. The blockade lasts until May 12, 1949.

=== November ===
- November 2 – Truman, the Democratic nominee, successfully ran for election for a full term against Thomas E. Dewey, the Republican nominee, who also was the Republican presidential nominee in 1944.

== 1949 ==
=== January ===
- January 3 – President Truman attends morning services with members of Congress to pray for the successes of the 81st United States Congress at the National Presbyterian Church.
- January 3 – In a vote of 29 to 13, Ohio Senator Robert A. Taft is re-elected as Republican Party policy leader alongside the approval of a rule change that an individual can serve in the position for more than four years.
- January 4 – During his first news conference of the 81st United States Congress, House Speaker Sam Rayburn tells reporters of his conviction that the legislative proposals of President Truman will have "considerable favor" and no priority list for legislation had been assembled.
- January 5 – President Truman delivers the 1949 State of the Union Address to a joint session of Congress, calling for the repeal of the Taft–Hartley Act, aid to farmers and implementation of civil rights laws, universal training, broader social security, education and prepaid medical insurance federal aid programs, and a million new housing units over the course of the next seven years.
- January 7 – President Truman holds a news conference in which he announces the nomination of Dean Acheson for Secretary of State to replace George Marshall and insists the change will not alter policy.
- January 8 – Five members of the Senate Labor committee endorse repealing the Taft–Hartley Act and restoring the Wagner Act prior to Congress giving consideration to any new legislation pertaining to labor.
- January 8 – The United States Army announces that it will not enlist any men for the months of either February or March as a result of increases in voluntary enlistments.
- January 8 – Indiana Representative Charles A. Halleck says the economic plan outlined by President Truman during the latter's State of the Union address would bankrupt the US in addition to inflicting irreversible damage to the American free enterprise system.
- January 8 – United States Secretary of the Air Force Stuart Symington advocates for a seventy-group air force and states that the US does not have much time to prepare during his first annual report.
- January 14 – During a press conference, State Department press officer Michael J. McDermott states that countries unwilling to enter the collective defense pacts will receive no arms and defense supplies from the United States.
- January 14 – The Senate Foreign Relations Committee unanimously votes to approve Dean Acheson as United States Secretary of State.
- January 14 – United States Attorney General Tom C. Clark announces that the Justice Department has filed suit for a divorce of the American Telephone and Telegraph Company and Western Electric company.
- January 20 – Second inauguration of Harry S. Truman
- January 31 – President Truman announces the nomination of Jesse M. Donaldson for Postmaster General, the only office in his cabinet with a fixed term.

=== February ===
- February 1 – Federal Mediation Director Cyrus S. Ching states the Labor Department is unable to fulfill President Truman's recommendation for a directing of the mediation service impartially, citing the department as being too pro-labor to fulfill the wish.
- February 3 – The United States notifies the world of its intent to not allow peace maneuvers by Russia to disrupt growing alliances between western powers that are not Communist during a radio broadcast.
- February 3 – Prime Minister of Japan Shigeru Yoshida states his hope that President Truman will visit Russia to meet with Joseph Stalin and touts a potential meeting as aiding world peace by helping Russia to be more mindful of international affairs.
- February 7 – During an appearance before the Senate Labor committee, Former National War Labor Board Chairman William Davis advocates for Congress to grant President Truman to seize struck plants amid the national emergency.
- February 7 – Federal Housing expediter Tighe E. Woods predicts a fifty to sixty percent increase in rent in the event Congress does not continue strengthening rent controls and advocates for the passage of the Truman administration bill extending rent controls to the end of March 1951.
- February 12 – Hungary requests the United States withdraw the American Minister in Budapest, Selden Chapin and charges President Truman with having tried to interfere with the internal affairs of Hungary.
- February 12 – Prime Minister of Canada Louis St. Laurent meets with President Truman for the first time in Washington for discussions relating to the defense of North American.
- February 12 – United States Secretary of the Air Force Stuart Symington delivers a speech at the Lincoln Day banquet in which he promotes the strength of the B-36 bomber.
- February 21 – Defense Secretary James Forrestal requests salary boosts for the military to put service members on the pay basis of civilians and a bill before the House Armed Services subcommittee came from 18 months of study by his advisory commission.
- February 21 – The Hoover Commission recommends changes to the State Department including more personnel to allow greater attention on foreign policy.
- February 21 – It is learned that the proposed North Atlantic pact will have reassurances that the United States will not stand idly by in the event of attack.

=== April ===
- April 1 – The Commerce Department reports that the United States's unemployment rate dropped the previous month, the first decline in four months.
- April 1 – An unnamed official at the State Department asserts the North Atlantic treaty as purely defensive and that Russia only needs to not attack any country allied with the treaty.
- April 1 – President Truman meets with Secretary of the Army Royall in regards to reports that the secretary intended to resign.
- April 14 – The United States Secretary of Labor Maurice J. Tobin sets a dollar and five cents an hour as the minimum wage on government contracts for the woolen and worsted industry.
- April 14 – The House and Senate passes a compromise European Recovery Program through a voice vote.

=== May ===
- May 23 – West Germany is established.

=== June ===
- June 2 – President Truman holds a news conference in which he indicates his willingness to remain in Washington throughout the entire summer as Congress has bogged down his legislative program.
- June 2 – The United Nations outlines a plan for spending more than 85 million over the following two years to assist underdeveloped countries in response to the Truman administration's call for a new program to spread knowledge on technology worldwide as well as raise living standards.
- June 8 – Republican Senator Bourke B. Hickenlooper states that the Atomic Energy Commission sent Norway radioactive isotopes for the purpose of using them in studies on steel in both jet engines and rockets and calls the move "a violation of the spirit if not the letter of the law."
- June 8 – During a Paris session, Secretary of State Acheson demands the foreign ministers council undo a five-day deadline for a complete end to the Berlin blockade. The council agrees to discuss the matter the following day.
- June 8 – The Senate resumes debate on the Truman administration's bill to repeal the Taft-Hartley Act. Senator Robert Taft accuses Democrats of playing politics in their handling of the legislation and argues that the bill and amendments be considered on the basis of their merit.

=== July ===
- July 26 – Truman appoints Secretary of State Dean Acheson, Secretary of Defense Louis A. Johnson, and AEC Chairman David E. Lilienthal as a special committee to investigate speeding up the production of nuclear weapons.

=== August ===
- August 29 – Joe-1, first test of an atomic bomb by the Soviet Union. Detected by the United States on September 3.

=== September ===
- September 1 – Ahead of President Truman's news conference, Senator Joseph McCarthy states he is just getting started on his inquiry into Harry H. Vaughan and insists that President Truman's willingness to keep Vaughan as his military aide is an endorsement of the latter's ideals.
- September 1 – President Truman holds a news conference on the tenth anniversary of the invasion of Poland, expressing hope that the conflict between the Communist and democratic nations ends with surrender.
- September 1 – The United States Army announces that the United States and Canadian military forces will collaborate on fighting techniques during the winter to develop a combined defense of the critical Arctic frontier.
- September 2 – Truman administration sources say the president is likely sign a 75 cent minimum wage bill sent to him by Congress albeit with reservations.
- September 2 – Senator Joseph McCarthy tells a reporter that he will advocate for Frank Costello being called as a witness in the Senate investigation of "five percenters", citing Costello as "a very necessary and important witness."
- September 2 – Republican Senator Eugene Millikin promises debate in the event the Truman administration attempts lowering tariff barriers for Britain and does not heed Republican demands to protect the domestic industry.
- September 3 – Senator Elmer Thomas requests a detailed account describing air travel by the White House following the refusal of Defense Secretary Johnson to assign a military plane to senators to allow them a junket around the world.
- September 4 – Senate Democratic Leader Scott W. Lucas says Republicans will politicize the reciprocal trade program in the event of the party's curbs on President Truman's tariff cutting program being granted an extension.
- September 6 – American officials says Britain will spend Marshall Plan funding anywhere the region wants to remove itself from its financial crisis.
- September 6 – General MacArthur announces there is no intention to permit mass discharges of American civilians stationed at occupation headquarters to meet Defense Secretary Johnson's economy drive.
- September 6 – Advisors to President Truman confirm his intent to spearhead Democratic campaigns by making appearances in multiple key states and that his Labor Day speech the previous day was a sample of the techniques he will use during the 1950 midterm elections.
- September 23 – Truman discloses the successful Soviet atomic bomb test to the American public.

=== October ===
- October 6 – Truman learns for the first time that a hydrogen bomb is possible.

=== November ===
- November 25 – Truman asks the Acheson–Johnson–Lilienthal special committee to consider the issue currently under major government debate of whether the hydrogen bomb should be developed.

=== December ===
- December 22 – President Truman holds a meeting with his Cabinet to review the administration's legislative program for the following year.
- December 22 – The Commerce Department announces its intent to impose bans on exports of technical information important to national security "in exceptional cases".

== 1950 ==
- January 1 – It is learned that President Truman has been given a new plan to prevent Formosa from entering Communist hands and its implementation would see the United States obtain a long-term lease on either a single base or multiple bases on Formosa.
- January 1 – President Truman joins the congregation of First Baptist Church in D.C. in observance of New Year's Day.
- January 1 – Chairman of the Senate Appropriations Committee Kenneth McKellar announces the upcoming meeting between the group's members will be to consider House plans to combine 1951 fiscal year appropriations into one measure.
- January 31 – After hearing from the Acheson–Johnson–Lilienthal special committee, Truman orders development of the hydrogen bomb to proceed.
- February 14 – Mao Zedong and Joseph Stalin sign the Sino-Soviet Treaty of Friendship, Alliance and Mutual Assistance.
- March 3 – The White House announces President Truman will ask Congress for authority to use his powers to seize and operate coal mines.
- March 3 – The Senate Labor Committee postpones a vote on a bill by Senator Wayne Morse that would authorize government seizure of the strike-bound coal mines, citing a lack of a quorum.
- March 3 – The United States Department of the Army announces a permanent armory for the purpose of training officers and men in the Organized Reserve Corps will be established in buildings that have yet to be purchased.
- March 8 – General Omar Bradley states the United States cannot be assured against a devastating blow with its present forces while giving a speech to the Women's National Press Club.
- March 8 – Wisconsin Senator Joseph McCarthy charges State Department employee Dorothy Kenyon with having affiliation with at least 28 Communist organizations during an appearance before a Senate Foreign Relations Subcommittee.
- March 10 – Truman orders the AEC to prepare for hydrogen bomb production.
- June 25 – Korean War begins.
- August 8 – The House postpones debate on an economic controls bill.
- August 8 – President Truman completes a message to Congress in which he calls for legislation responding to combat sabotage and Communists, White House officials stating their expectation for it to be released sometime during the afternoon and that it contains a warning to the United States against being carried away by hysteria.
- August 8 – Carroll L. Wilson resigns as General Manager of the Atomic Energy Commission and Carleton Shugg is designated by the commission to serve as acting general manager.
- August 8 – FBI Director J. Edgar Hoover warns that every Communist in the United States could potentially be a spy or saboteur and states the interest of the FBI in identifying every Communist within the country.
- November 1 – Attempted assassination of Harry S. Truman

== 1951 ==
=== January ===
- January 2 – President Truman signs a bill prohibiting slot machine shipments in addition to related gambling devices across the state line, the legislation providing fines and jail terms for violations.
- January 2 – The 81st United States Congress sends a civilian defense bill granting the federal government in the event of a foreign attack on the United States to the White House.
- January 4 – President Truman states his belief that inflation will eventually have to be halted through the implementation of across-the-board price and wage controls and that he will elaborate on his position in his upcoming State of the Union address.
- January 4 – Chairman of the House Armed Services Committee Carl Vinson says Congress will be requested to grant a six-month extension to the amount of service for draftees and calls the request one of the few parts of the proposal that he can confirm will be asked.
- January 6 – President Truman sends General Dwight D. Eisenhower to Europe with assurances that his efforts to build defenses against Soviet communism are whole-heartedly supported by the American people.
- January 6 – Nevada Senator Pat McCarran rebukes the 30-day price freeze being considered by the Truman administration as ineffective and calls for price curbs that are both "immediate and systemic" to "stop the impending threat to the economic and industrial life of America."
- January 8 – President Truman delivers the 1951 State of the Union address to a joint session of Congress.
- January 9 – Wisconsin Senator Joseph McCarthy publicly discloses a letter he sent to Secretary of the Army Pace asking how classified military messages became known to columnist Drew Pearson.
- January 10 – President Truman attends the award ceremonies for the Woodrow Wilson Foundation in his White House office.
- January 11 – President Truman delivers remarks at a buffet dinner at the Shoreham Hotel in Washington held in honor of Democratic members of Congress, where he cautions them to retain their principles of "honor and justice" over "fat and ease" in trying to seek world peace.
- January 11 – Informed sources familiar with American policy deny the chances of a meeting between high-level officials of the United States and Red China that would entail the countries discussing a Korean settlement.
- January 11 – California Senator William Knowland proposes a six-to-one ratio arming Western Europe against Communist aggression that would ultimately see the US furnishing 10 divisions and the other North Atlantic nations providing 60 divisions.
- January 12 – Senator Robert Taft says the Truman administration has ended bipartisan foreign policy with President Truman's declaration that he would consult Congress in sending troops to Europe but would not be bound to do so.
- January 12 – Assistant Secretary of Defense Anna Rosenberg testifies to Congress over President Truman's increase in American fighting forces.
- January 12 – President Truman signs the Federal Civil Defense Act of 1950 into law. President Truman says the legislation is intended to protect Americans in the event of enemy assault and "affords the basic framework for preparations to minimize the effects of an attack on our civilian population, and to deal with the immediate emergency conditions which such an attack would create."
- January 12 – President Truman transmits the fifth annual Economic Report to Congress in a message, all the while stressing the need for unity for the United States to prosper on the economic front.
- January 15 – The White House announces that James G. McDonald has resigned as United States Ambassador to Israel and President Truman has responded by nominating Monnett B. Davis as his successor.
- January 15 – President Truman sends a budget message to Congress on an appropriation for flood control and river harbor projects.
- January 17 – Republican Senators Irving Ives and Andrew Frank Schoeppel demand that the inflationary effects of President Truman's defense housing program be kept to a minimum, stating that Congress must prevent the American economy from being dangerously strained by the program.
- January 17 – Chairman of the Corporation of the Massachusetts Institute of Technology Karl T. Compton calls on Congress to adopt the Truman administration-backed Universal Military Service and Training Program and advocates for an alternate service for those unable to meet the physical or mental qualifications of the service.
- January 20 – The United States demands in a resolution that China be named as the aggressor in Korea by the United Nations and that the time has come to draw the line in regard to free nations while admitting the door to a peace settlement with the UN was still possible.
- January 20 – General Douglas MacArthur says the western powers need to make up their mind what they want to do in the war with Communist China during a visit to Eighth Army Headquarters.
- January 22 – General Omar Bradley testifies before the Senate preparedness subcommittee on his view that the American military is ready to "avert disaster" for the United States.
- January 22 – Chairman of the Senate-House Atomic Energy Committee Brien McMahon calls for a $50 billion global peace plan and requests it be added to a Senate resolution expressing friendship for the Russians, adding that the United States was losing ground in its battle for the minds of men.
- January 23 – President Truman signs Executive Order 10207, forming the President's Commission on Internal Security and Individual Rights in addition to outlining its purpose and its membership of "a Chairman, a Vice Chairman, and seven other members" that are to be appointed by the president.
- January 24 – President Truman attends a dinner in honor of his banker Joshua Evans at the Mayflower Hotel in Washington.
- January 25 – President Truman holds his two hundred and fifty-third news conference in the Indian Treaty Room in the Executive Office Building. President Truman begins the conference with an address on U.S. Representative to the United Nations Warren R. Austin conveying American government views on Communist China and announces appointments to the President's Commission on Internal Security and Individual Rights.
- January 25 – President Truman signs Executive Order 10208, authorizing the Secretary of State "to perform the functions and exercise the powers and authority vested in the President by the Yugoslav Emergency Relief Assistance Act of 1950."
- January 27 – President Truman issues a memorandum to executive department and agency leadership on the need for support of "the economic stabilization orders issued today" and provides three steps the agencies should work in alignment with under the law.
- January 30 – President Truman attends a special ceremony in honor of Sam Rayburn serving longer as Speaker of the House of Representatives than any other individual in American history in his White House office.
- January 30 – President Truman and French Prime Minister Pleven issue a joint statement on their agreements over the course of their conference as well as an outline of various issues afflicting the international community such as problems in the Far East, Europe issues, defense plans for the Atlantic, and economic dilemmas.
- January 31 – In a letter to Director of the Bureau of the Budget, citing a period of national emergency, President Truman requests the establishment of "a Federal history program for all the agencies engaged in emergency activities" and asks that the "active direction of the program should be undertaken by the Bureau of the Budget, although the preparation of the studies themselves should be carried out by the individual agencies."
- January 31 – President Truman attends a dinner for the Democratic National Congressional Committee in the Caucus Room of the Congressional Hotel in Washington.

=== February ===
- February 27 – In a message to Congress, President Truman addresses the "very large deficits" arising for the United States postal service and advocates that Congress "correct the present unsound condition of the postal revenues."
- February 27 – President Truman delivers remarks to a group from the 82d Airborne Division in the Rose Garden.
- February 27 – President Truman delivers broadcast remarks on the role of the Red Cross in expressing "our basic national ideal of giving a helping hand to others" during the morning.
- February 28 – In a statement, President Truman notes the upcoming thirty-ninth anniversary of the establishment of the Girl Scouts and points out that today "more than a million and a half girls in the United States are taking part in the Girl Scout program".

=== March ===
- March 2 – The Defense Department is reported to have informed Congress of its expectation to have six American divisions in Europe by the beginning of July 1952 in the event that war does not break out.
- March 3 – In a statement, Republican Senator James P. Kem labels the Reconstruction Finance Corporation as "corrupt" in addition to demanding Congress abolish the corporation and charging President Truman with seemingly being unwilling to reform the agency.
- March 3 – The Treasury Department and Federal Reserve Board announce a settlement in their conflict on the settling of inflation.
- March 3 – The United States offers the United Nations permission to count both its armed forces and non-atomic weapons in addition to calling on Russia to do the same.
- March 3 – Representative Frederic René Coudert Jr. states his intent to introduce a constitutional amendment the following week that if enacted would allow Congress to vote the president out of office with two-thirds a vote by calling for the president to resign immediately or call for a national election for the president, vice president, or Congress.
- March 5 – The United States Navy denies through a spokesman that President Truman has ordered a special guard against submarines in the Gulf of Mexico.
- March 24 – President Truman signs Executive Order 10227, extending the provisions of Part I of Executive Order 10210 "to the General Services Administration; and, subject to the limitations and regulations contained in such part, and under such regulations as he may prescribe, the Administrator of General Services is authorized to perform and exercise, as to the General Services Administration, all the functions and authority vested in and granted by the said Part I to the Secretaries named therein".
- March 26 – President Truman delivers remarks at the opening of the meeting between the Foreign Ministers of the American Republics during an afternoon appearance in Constitution Hall.
- March 26 – In a statement, President Truman says the enactment of H.R. 2268 "will be a great convenience to Series E Savings Bond holders who desire to retain their investments in E bonds" and the legislation's authority will grant the owners of maturing Series E bonds the option of keeping the bonds and earning interest over the period of the next ten years.
- March 26 – President Truman signs Executive Order 10228, designating the Inter-American Defense Board "as a public international organization entitled to enjoy the privileges, exemptions, and immunities conferred by the said International Organizations Immunities Act."

=== April ===
- April 5 – Julius and Ethel Rosenberg are sentenced to death following their convictions on conspiring to provide secret information to the Soviet Union.
- April 11 – Truman relieves General Douglas MacArthur of all posts as commander of American and U.N. forces in the Far East for making statements critical of the government's military and foreign policies in that area. MacArthur is replaced by Lt. Gen. Matthew B. Ridgway.

=== August ===
- August 1 – In a statement, President Truman announces his intent to create "a new independent agency whose sole job will be to procure and to increase the supply of critical and strategic materials at home and abroad" that will be called the Defense Materials Procurement Agency.
- August 1 – The Defense Department calls for a draft of 41,000 men during the upcoming October for enlistment in the Marine Corps and Army, the Marine Corps' first draft since the start of the Korean campaign.
- August 1 – President Truman signs a proclamation cutting off American tariffs concessions to Czechoslovakia, marking the second time the federal government has retaliated against the country since the April arrest of William N. Oatis.
- August 1 – President Truman delivers remarks to the delegates of Girls Nation in the Rose Garden.
- August 3 – In a statement, the State Department confirms William O'Dwyer transferred a million dollars from Mexico to New York as part of a transaction between the Mexican and American governments and the transfer was conducted in normal conditions.
- August 3 – The Wage Stabilization Board recommends all workers receive living wage increases.
- August 3 – The Air Force announces its sending of the first wing of the F-86 fighter interceptors to England and that the departure can be expected soon.
- August 6 – President Truman meets with Democratic National Committee Chairman William M. Boyle, Jr., Boyle afterward confirming his intent to remain as chairman at least until the end of his term.
- August 10 – The State Department announces its belief that Russia is tightening around Communist Poland and that the Polish government has ordered a cessation of American cultural activities in Poland without alternative to complying with the order.
- August 10 – Senator Joseph McCarthy offers allowing "a good Democrat" head a committee to see who is correct in his feud with the State Department and other senators over his allegations of communism in the government.
- August 10 – Aides to President Truman state that he is personally gathering facts on the methods used in the recruitment of high school players for the Military and Naval Academies.
- August 11 – The California Democratic Party endorses Truman for re-election.
- August 13 – Senate Majority Leader Ernest McFarland sets October 1 as the target date for Congress being adjourned.
- August 13 – The Senate Finance Committee begins closed door consideration for the tax bill.
- August 20 – In a message to Congress, President Truman requests additional funding to provide relief for the Midwest stricken by a flood disaster.
- August 20 – In a message to Congress, President Truman transmits "herewith the resolution of the Presidium of the Supreme Soviet, together with the accompanying letter from Mr. Shvernik."
- August 21 – In a statement, President Truman says the enactment of H.R. 3795 "marks the fact that a significant turn of events has been reached in the relations between the United States and the Ute Indians" and allows for "a program for use of the share awarded to the Ute Indian Tribe of the Uintah and Ouray Reservation" that will grant parts of the compensation to the Ute Indians.
- August 24 – The United States declines calls by Czechoslovakia to curb broadcasts of American-operated radio Europe.
- August 24 – Chairman of the Senate Armed Services Committee Richard Russell, Jr. reports that President Truman called him to the White House to discuss a number of issues and predicts the congressional cut to the administration's foreign aid bill is going to remain in spite of Truman's opposition.
- August 30 – President Truman signs Executive Order 10283, establishing "a Board of Inquiry, consisting of such members as I shall appoint, to inquire into the issues involved in" labor disputes.
- August 31 – President Truman attends the presentation of a Floral Replica of a Defense Bond in the Rose Garden.

=== November ===
- November 1 – The White House announces President Truman's intent to recommend to Congress collectors of internal revenue being bought under Civil Service.
- November 1 – American army forces are exposed to an atomic blast for the first time in Las Vegas, the blast going off without casualty.
- November 1 – Elizabeth II places a wreath on the grave of George Washington at Mount Vernon during a ceremony.
- November 5 – The United States is reported to have proposed a worldwide census, one of the issues being a complete accounting for all atomic weapons through a strict system of verification.
- November 5 – President Truman meets with General Dwight D. Eisenhower in Washington for a discussion on Western defense issues and an upcoming foreign policy speech by Truman.
- November 5 – Wyoming Senator Joseph C. O'Mahoney confirms his cautioning of Defense Secretary Lovett and Pentagon officials about the need to cut the following year's military spending so that the pattern of tax revenues will remain consistent.
- November 6 – President Truman delivers a speech to the National Society of Cartoonists. He notably addresses the previous day's meeting with Eisenhower, saying it was in regards to Europe maintaining economic stability while rearming and that Eisenhower was fearful of "much trouble".

== 1952 – January 1953 ==
- January 2 – President Truman announces his ordering of a reorganization of the Internal Revenue Bureau.
- January 3 – President Truman holds a news conference in the Indian Treaty Room of the Old Executive Office Building during the afternoon.
- January 9 – President Truman delivers the 1952 State of the Union Address.
- January 10 – President Truman holds a new conference in the Indian Treaty Room of the Executive Office Building during the morning.
- January 12 – President Truman releases a statement on the current status and plans for the civil defense of the United States.
- January 14 – President Truman sends a message to Congress that transmits the initial report on trade agreements having escape clauses.
- January 16 – President Truman releases a statement commemorating the sixty-ninth anniversary of the Civil Service System noting the progress of the US since the program beginning in 1883. President Truman sends his annual economic report to Congress.
- January 18 – President Truman and Prime Minister Winston Churchill release a joint statement outlining their agreements regarding the United States Atlantic Command.
- March 3 – United States Secretary of the Treasury John W. Snyder tells senators that the Truman administration's plan reorganization of the Internal Revenue Service will not remove the rights of taxpayers to get local jury trials in tax cases that are disputed.
- March 3 – The Supreme Court upholds the anti-Communist teacher law in New York designed to bar subversive persons from working in the New York school system by a vote of 6 to 3.
- May 31 – Congressman Daniel A. Reed says that President Truman's announcement that he was not running for re-election to a second full term was a ploy to dissuade interest in corruption scandals while he wages a hidden campaign for another term.
- June 27 – The House of Representatives and the Senate override Truman's veto of the McCarran-Walter Act.
- September – Truman rejects the recommendation of the State Department Panel of Consultants on Disarmament to delay the first test of a hydrogen bomb.
- October 31 – Ivy Mike, first hydrogen bomb test, is staged by the United States.
- November 4 – Dwight D. Eisenhower is elected president in the United States presidential election of 1952.
- December 4 – Chairman of the Wage Stabilization Board Archibald Cox resigns in protest to coal miners receiving an extra wage boost beyond the recommendations of all top defense agency officials.
- December 4 – Truman administration officials confirm the administration will make no further efforts toward solving the Korean situation, leaving the incoming Eisenhower administration to make changes.

=== 1953 ===
- January 20 – Dwight D. Eisenhower is inaugurated as the 34th president of the United States, at noon EST.

== See also ==
- Timeline of the Franklin D. Roosevelt presidency, for his predecessor
- Timeline of the Dwight D. Eisenhower presidency, for his successor
