= Timeline of the John F. Kennedy presidency =

John F. Kennedy, a Democrat from Massachusetts, was elected President of the United States on November 8, 1960, was inaugurated as the nation's 35th president on January 20, 1961, and his presidency ended on November 22, 1963, upon his assassination and death. The following articles cover the timeline of Kennedy's presidency:

- Timeline of the John F. Kennedy presidency (1961)
- Timeline of the John F. Kennedy presidency (1962)
- Timeline of the John F. Kennedy presidency (1963)

== See also ==
- Timeline of the Dwight D. Eisenhower presidency, for his predecessor
- Timeline of the Lyndon B. Johnson presidency, for his successor
