= Timeline of the John F. Kennedy presidency (1962) =

The following is a timeline of the presidency of John F. Kennedy from January 1, 1962, to December 31, 1962.

== January ==
- January 11 – Kennedy delivers his second State of the Union address.

== February ==
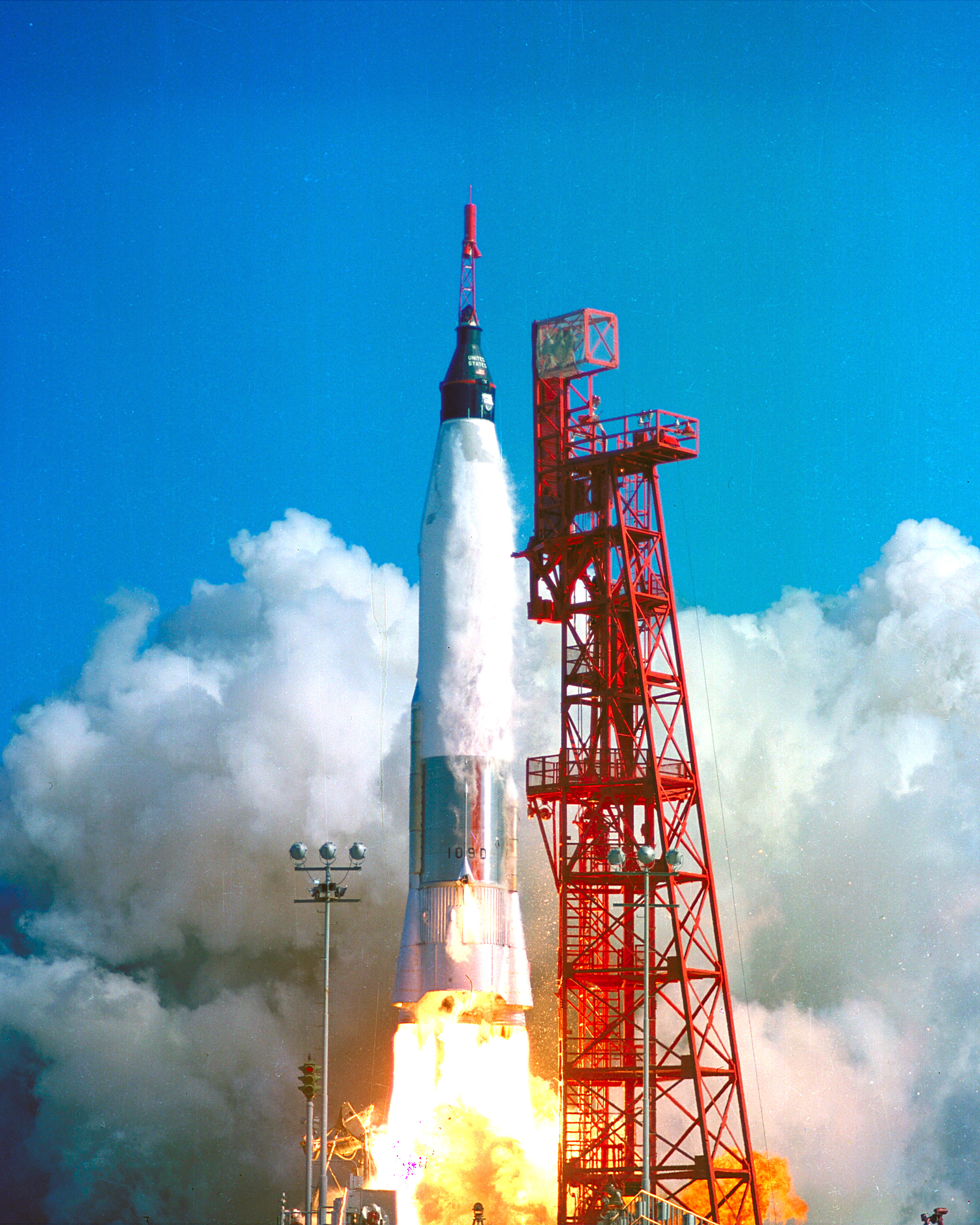
February 20: John Glenn, aboard the Friendship 7 space capsule, becomes the first American to orbit the Earth.

- February 12 – As Commander-in-chief, Kennedy commutes the military death sentence of seaman Jimmie Henderson to life imprisonment, marking the last time in the 20th century that an American president was faced with such a decision (As of 28 July 2008, the most recent such decision was when President George W. Bush decided to deny clemency to Private Ronald A. Gray).
- February 20 – John Glenn, aboard the space capsule Friendship 7, is launched into an orbital spaceflight by a Mercury-Atlas 6 rocket and becomes the first American to orbit the Earth.

== March ==
- March 22 – Kennedy signs into law HR5143 (Pub. L. 87–423), abolishing the mandatory death penalty for first degree murder in the District of Columbia, the only remaining jurisdiction in the United States with a mandatory death sentence for first degree murder, replacing it with life imprisonment with parole if the jury could not decide between life imprisonment and the death penalty, or if the jury chose life imprisonment by a unanimous vote. The death penalty in the District of Columbia has not been applied since 1957, and has now been abolished.

== April ==
- April 6 - "After yearlong negotiations between steel companies and unions--which involved the personal participation of the president [Kennedy]-- a deal was announced that prevented the rise of steel prices." The government's interest in the deal was to control inflation.
- April 10 - "U.S. Steel Chairman Roger Blough scheduled a meeting at the White House and stunned the president by informing him that he was going to announce a 3.5 percent price increase, effective at midnight". Of course this was a betrayal of the recently negotiated deal and would have a ripple effect creating inflation across the economy. Within the next three days, "the Attorney General Bobby Kennedy announced a grand jury probe of steel price-fixing." FBI agents raided the offices of steel executives and by April 12 and 14, they all caved and agreed not to raise their prices.

== May ==
- May 1 – Kennedy signs the Educational Television Facilities Act into law, marking the first time Congress provides major federal aid to public broadcasting.
- May 3 - At dinner at the White House, Arthur Schlesinger Jr. asked President Kennedy what he had said to Roger Blough, Chairman of U.S. Steel. "I told him that his men could keep their horses for the summer plowing," This was a pithy reference to the Gentlemen's Agreement between Generals Grant and Lee that ended the Civil War. Lincoln had instructed Grant to be magnanimous with the Confederates. But, just as the Confederates morphed into rifle clubs and white power groups to "redeem" the South after the Civil War, the business community closed ranks against the Kennedy administration, and made common cause against them with the aggrieved cold warriors. CIA agent, Henry Luce invoked the fate of Julius Caesar in a harsh editorial in Fortune, warning JFK that he should "beware the ides of April.'
- May 19 – Marilyn Monroe sings Happy Birthday, Mr. President to President Kennedy in Madison Square Garden as part of the President's 45th birthday celebrations (his birthday was on May 29).

== June ==
- June 29 – July 1 – Kennedy makes the fifth international trip of his presidency, travelling to Mexico City, Mexico, for a state visit. There he meets with Mexican President Adolfo López Mateos.

== July ==
- July 4 – Kennedy delivers an address at Independence Hall, Philadelphia, Pennsylvania, in which he speaks of the new movement toward interdependence that is transforming the world, and noting that the spirit of that new effort is the same spirit which gave birth to the American Constitution.
- July 10 – President Kennedy attends the All Star baseball game at D.C. Stadium, and throws out the first pitch.

== September ==
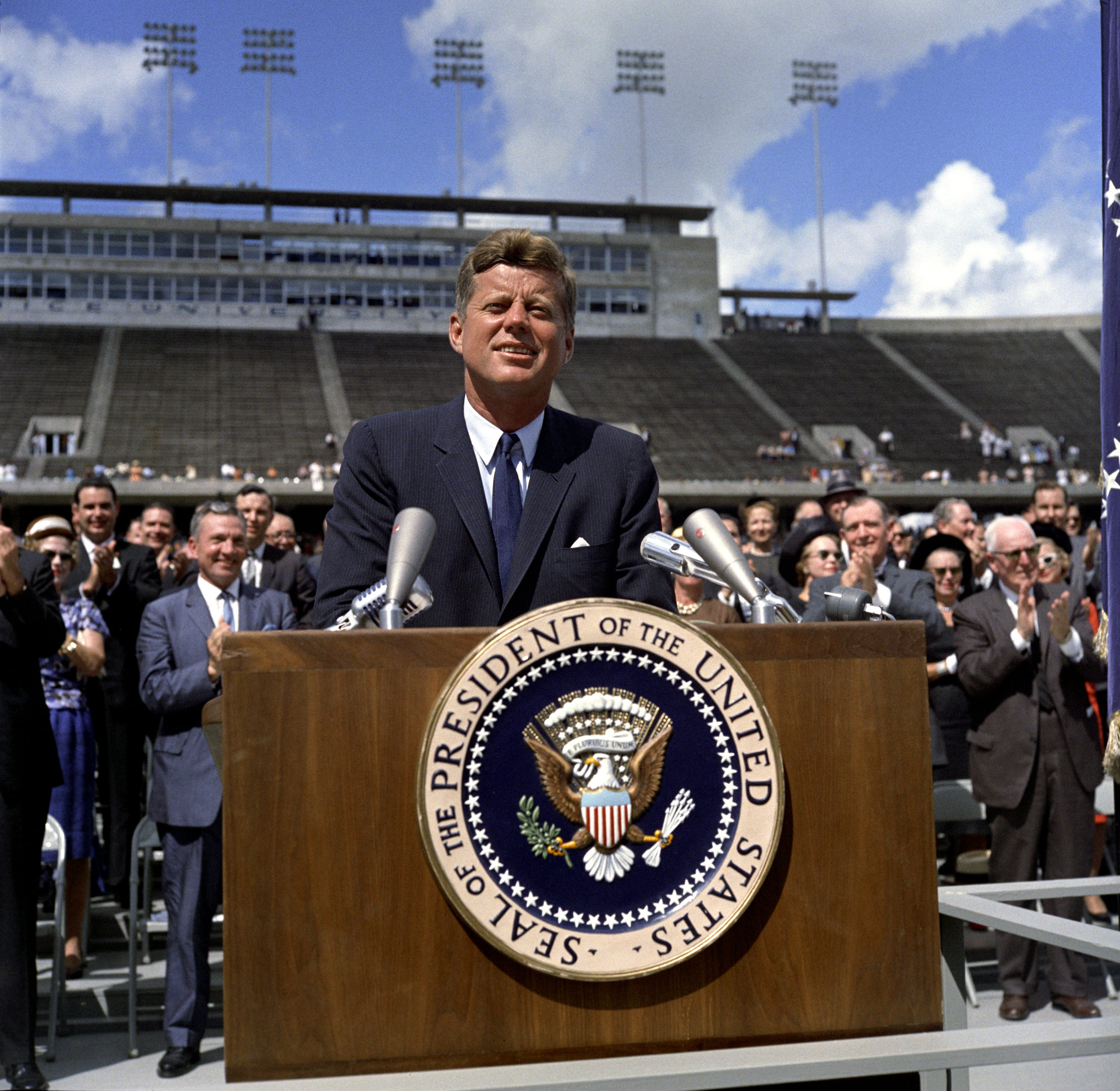
September 12: President Kennedy visits Rice University to deliver a speech on the nation's space program.

- September 12 – Kennedy delivers a speech at Rice University on the subject of the nation's plans to land humans on the Moon. Kennedy announces his continued support for increased space expenditures, saying "we choose to go to the Moon in this decade and do the other things, not because they are easy, but because they are hard."

== October ==
- October 22 – In a televised address, Kennedy announces the October 14 discovery of Soviet missiles in Cuba, making public the Cuban Missile Crisis. Kennedy also announces a naval "quarantine on all offensive military equipment" to that country.

== November ==
- November 6 – The 1962 elections are held. The Democrats lose seats in the House to Republicans, but maintain their majority; they increase their majority in the Senate. Kennedy's brother Ted wins a special election in Massachusetts to represent the state as junior senator, in the seat his brother had held prior to his election as president.
- November 22 – Kennedy is presented with the Laetare Medal by Rev. Theodore Hesburgh, the president of the University of Notre Dame. The Medal, annually awarded by Notre Dame, is considered the highest award for American Catholics. Kennedy was presented with the award in the Oval Office, by Fr. Hesburgh, who was also a member of the United States Commission on Civil Rights, and the Rev. Edmund P. Joyce, the university's executive vice president. He would be assassinated exactly a year later.

== December ==
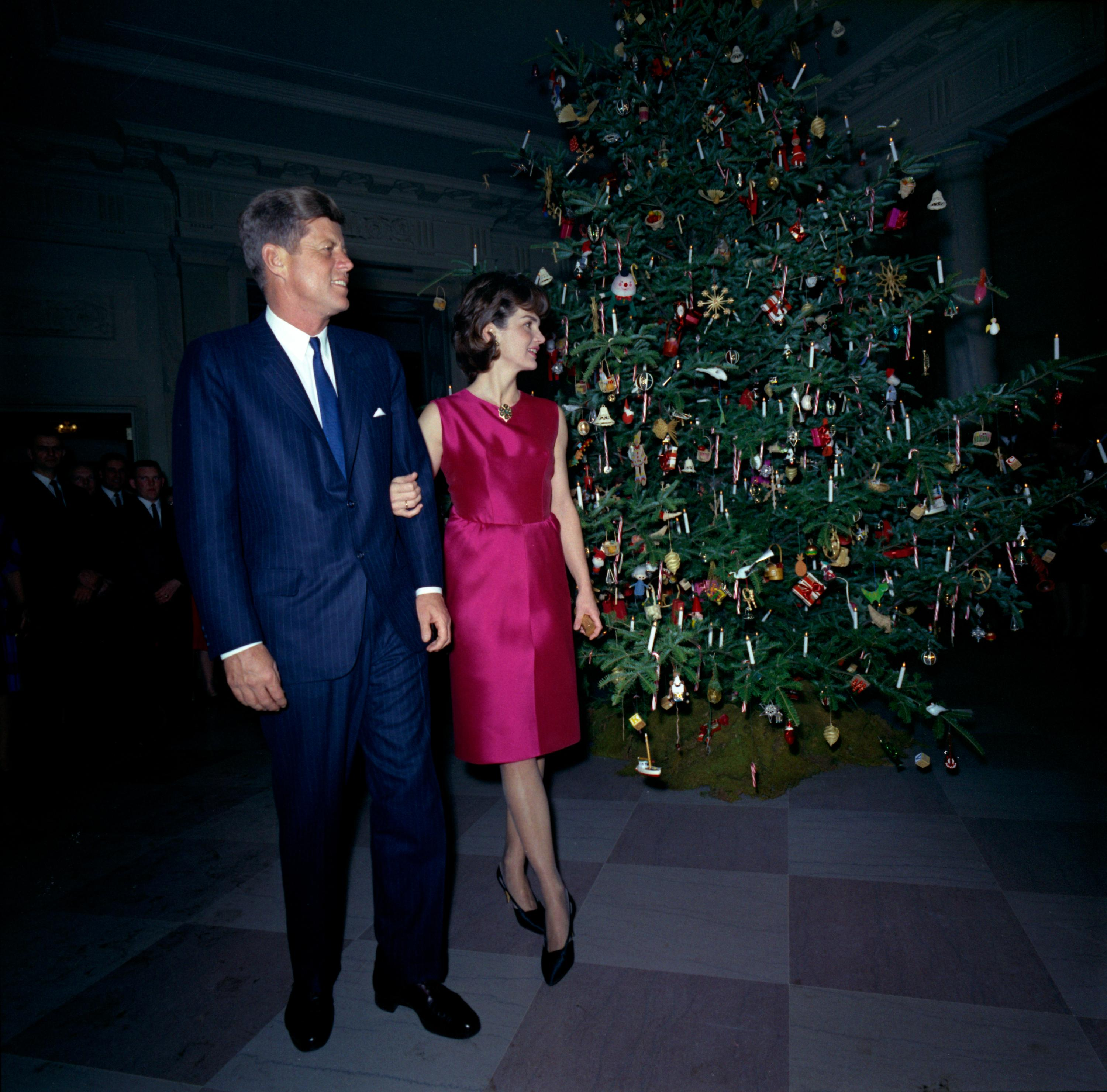
December 12: President and Mrs. Kennedy standing next to the White House Christmas tree, located in the Entrance Hall.

- December 12 – President Kennedy meets with President Jorge Alessandri of the Republic of Chile to have a working meeting to discuss the Alliance for Progress.
- December 18–21 – Kennedy makes the sixth international trip of his presidency, travelling to Nassau, The Bahamas, where he confers with British Prime Minister Harold Macmillan and concludes an agreement on nuclear defense systems.
- December 25 – President and Mrs. Kennedy attend mass at St. Ann's Church in Palm Beach, Florida. The Kennedys later hold a party for members of the Secret Service and their families.

== See also ==
- Timeline of the John F. Kennedy presidency, for an index of the Kennedy presidency timeline articles

U.S. presidential administration timelines
Preceded by Kennedy presidency (1961)	Kennedy presidency (1962)	Succeeded by Kennedy presidency (1963)
