= Timeline of the Dwight D. Eisenhower presidency =

The presidency of Dwight D. Eisenhower began on January 20, 1953, when Dwight D. Eisenhower was inaugurated as the 34th president of the United States, and ended on January 20, 1961.

== 1953 ==
- January 20 – First inauguration of Dwight D. Eisenhower
- January 21 – President Eisenhower meets with Herbert Brownell Jr. in the Oval Office for discussions on business. This is President Eisenhower's first appointment since taking office. George M. Humphrey is sworn in as the 55th United States Secretary of the Treasury, Douglas McKay is sworn in as the 35th United States Secretary of the Interior, Martin Patrick Durkin is sworn in as the 7th United States Secretary of Labor, Sinclair Weeks is sworn in as the 13th United States Secretary of Commerce, Ezra Taft Benson is sworn in as the 15th United States Secretary of Agriculture, and Arthur Summerfield is sworn in as the 54th Postmaster General of the United States during a ceremony at the White House in the evening.
- January 22 – President Eisenhower appoints Charles Erwin Wilson as the 5th United States Secretary of Defense during the evening. Wilson agrees beforehand to abandon his General Motors stock that was worth $2 and a half million. Agriculture Secretary Benson pledges to overhaul and cut expenses of the Agriculture Department and regroups the twenty agencies into four.
- January 27 – Committees vote for President Eisenhower to reorganize the government and for Congress to have an easier time vetoing reorganization moves.
- January 27 – The Senate confirms Harold Stassen for Director of the Mutual Security Agency.
- January 27 – During an evening address in Washington, Secretary of State Dulles predicts the Soviet Union regime may collapse from human rights violations .
- April 16 – Chance for Peace speech
- May 4 – President Eisenhower meets with governors of U.S. states and territories along with other federal officials behind closed doors at the State Department for what is called by Eisenhower a discussion on the peace and security of the United States.
- May 4 – Secretary of State Dulles warns that other countries will be pushed toward trade with Communist regions in the event of U.S. tariff barriers against imports being tightened and advocates for the bill by Representative Richard M. Simpson intended to bolster tariff protection for American industries in a countering of competition from less costly foreign goods.
- May 4 – The United States nominates Pakistan as the neutral custodian for Korean War prisoners declining to go home in the aftermath of an armistice.
- June 18 – President Eisenhower announces the US will be submitting 50 million dollars to West Berlin for what he says will strengthen the economy and prevent West Berlin citizens from succumbing to "the great pressures to which they are constantly exposed." Vice President Nixon breaks two-tie breaking votes in the Senate.
- June 30 – A voice vote in the Senate enables President Eisenhower to shift foreign aid funds with thinner restrictions.
- July 27 – Korean War ends.
- July 28 – Secretary of State Dulles says the US will not buy the unification of Korea if it means Communist China will receive admission to the United Nations during a news conference.
- July 29 – The Senate votes 63 to 30 in favor of emergency administration admitting 209,000 aliens to the US.
- August 12 – Soviet Union conducts first test of a thermonuclear weapon.
- October 30 – Eisenhower approves NSC 162/2, which defines Cold War national security policy during the Eisenhower administration.
- November 1 – In a Los Angeles appearance, Senator Joseph McCarthy says a member of the loyalty appeal board of the office of Army Secretary Stevens would be called to appear before his committee for questions on communist affiliations. McCarthy does not name the board member.
- November 2 – Agriculture Secretary Benson tells newsmen of his plans for the reshuffle of the Agriculture Department and his willingness to resign if President Eisenhower requests him to.
- November 3 – Senator McCarthy says a man suspected to be Abraham Brothman is working at a radar plant and announces he will be called as a witness at a subcommittee the following day.
- November 4 – President Eisenhower holds a news conference on foreign policy.
- December 8 – Eisenhower delivers "Atoms for Peace" speech to United Nations in New York.

== 1954 ==
- January 2 – It is disclosed that President Eisenhower will submit tax programs to Congress that have been modified in a message shortly after he delivers the State of the Union address and regular budget messages.
- January 4 – President Eisenhower issues a memorandum on the Red Cross to the heads of departments and agencies. President Eisenhower states his wishes for a continuation of the "consistently high standard of generous giving" to the Red Cross that has traditionally been supplied by the federal government's personnel.
- January 4 – In an evening address from the Broadcast Room of the White House, President Eisenhower notes accomplishments of the administration over the last eleven months of its existence and the goals of the administration.
- January 5 – Eisenhower orders that a "blank wall" be placed between physicist J. Robert Oppenheimer and all areas of operation of the Department of Defense.
- January 6 – President Eisenhower attends morning special church services marking the reconvening of Congress at the National Presbyterian Church in Washington. Other government officials including members of the president's cabinet and Congress were invited.
- January 7 – President Eisenhower delivers the 1954 State of the Union Address to a joint session of Congress. Eisenhower outlines a program to bolster American military might and that of countries fighting communism while maintaining a healthy economy in the United States.
- January 7 – The State Department announces that the next few days will see the United States and Russia begin preliminary discussions on the atomic pool proposal by President Eisenhower.
- May 17 – Brown v. Board of Education
- July 7 – In prepared testimony, U.S. Chamber of Commerce spokesman A.D. Marshall advocates for a bill in the House to be revised to broaden social security coverage for eight million people presently ineligible.
- July 7 – Senator Joseph McCarthy announces that he will turn over information to the Hoover Commission that will validate his claim that Communists have infiltrated the Central Intelligence Agency.
- July 7 – The federal government announces that employment has increased by nearly one million in the period between May and June while unemployment showed little increase.
- July 8 – Secretary of State Dulles announces that if necessary the United States will use its own veto to keep Red China out of the UN Security Council during a news conference.
- July 8 – President Eisenhower names the membership of a board that will investigate the atomic energy plant workers' strike.
- July 8 – American delegation officials confirm the indefinite continuance of super bomb tests on Eniwetok and Bikini while expressing regret for the injuries caused by the tests in the Marshall Islands.
- July 10 – President Eisenhower signs a bill granting disposal abroad of surplus farm commodities of up to $1 billion, Eisenhower in a statement saying the legislation is intended to assist nations friendly to the United States and form new markets.
- July 10 – The Senate Foreign Relations Committee votes to end foreign aid to France and Italy by December 31 unless the two countries ratify the European Defense plan or an alternative before the aforementioned deadline.
- July 10 – An American embassy spokesman in Prague states that the embassy is attempting to secure the release of seven American soldiers that were seized by Czech frontier guards the previous July 4.
- July 13 – The Senate Finance Committee votes to authorize farm operations and professionals to decide whether they wish to be covered by the compulsory Social Security coverage, the vote conflicting with the wishes of the Eisenhower administration.
- July 14 – The Senate Armed Services Committee holds a closed-door session with acting United States Secretary of State Walter Bedell Smith and Chairman of the Joint Chiefs of Staff Arthur W. Radford on the Eisenhower administration's foreign aid program.
- July 14 – It is disclosed that the United States has agreed to send Undersecretary of State Walter Bedell Smith to Geneva again after instigation from Britain and France.
- September 8 – The Southeast Asia Treaty Organization (SEATO) was formed on September 8, 1954, as the Southeast Asian version of NATO aimed at preventing the spread of communism.
- October 1 – United States Secretary of Commerce Sinclair Weeks arrives in Kansas for a Republican centennial dinner.
- October 2 – Supreme Allied Commander Europe Alfred Gruenther says Russia would be defeated if launching an attack on western Europe at this time and that the western allies would have a good chance of stopping a Soviet onslaught within the next three to four years.
- October 2 – The Denver White House announces that the United States will send a navy-led expedition to the Antarctic and that the decision is in line with continued American interest in the area.
- October 4 – It is disclosed that India told Pakistan that American aid to Pakistan would bring consequences that would make it necessary for India to maintain forces in anticipation of aggression.
- October 4 – The Commerce Department announces the allocation of over $20 million in airport improvements within 164 communities.
- October 4 – George McConnaughey is sworn in as Chairman of the Federal Communications Commission by Harold Burton.
- October 4 – Chairman of the Atomic Energy Commission Lewis L. Strauss says that atomic tests have indicated that "spinach removes calcium from the body" during a discussion with the District of Columbia League of Republican Women.
- October 5 – Mobilization officials maintain that the newest attempt of the Eisenhower administration to steer new defense industries into cities stricken with unemployment would not be authorized to obstruct the industrial dispersion program.
- October 5 – The government of Jordan announces its intent to create tourist offices in the United States and Europe for better organization for Jordan in international affairs.
- October 5 – The United States Army issues a draft call for 23,000 men in December.
- October 6 – Vice President Nixon delivers a morning address at Commodore Perry Hotel on the midterm elections, saying that the fundamental issue is the same as the 1952 elections.
- October 6 – Attorney General of the United States Herbert Brownell Jr. forms a new unit in the criminal division of the Justice Department to handle the increased number of scandals in the Federal Housing Administration.
- October 6 – The Senate-House Atomic Energy Committee makes public a telegram from the Atomic Energy Commission to the congressional committee requesting a waiver of the legal provision that would authorize the contract for feeding private power into the Tennessee Valley Authority from taking effect the following year unless the Senate-House Atomic Energy Committee approves an earlier date.
- October 6 – Soviet Minister of Foreign Affairs Vyacheslav Molotov proposes the United States, France, Russia, and Britain concurrently resolve an agreement that would lead to the cessation of the occupation of East and West Germany and declares that Russia is ready to discuss proposals made earlier in the year during the Berlin conference.
- October 7 – Internal Revenue Commissioner T. Coleman Andrews states that the government has a chance to collect more taxes from "windfall profits" after collecting from postwar building projects and gives appraisal to the Senate Banking Committee.
- October 13 – Representatives Carl T. Durham and Chester E. Holifield state that they will oppose the Eisenhower administration's request for prompt clearance of the Dixon-Yates contract.
- October 13 – The United States, Britain, France, and Canada call for a big-power group tackling disarmament problems.
- October 14 – Republican Senator Joseph McCarthy says the Eisenhower administration farm program has significantly hurt Republicans in their attempts to retain control of Congress in the 1954 midterm elections.
- November 1 – At a studio of the Columbia Broadcasting System in Washington, President Eisenhower delivers remarks on the completion of the election cycle and the importance of the participation voters will be making the following day.
- November 1 – The Justice Department announces the arrest of forty-four year old Martha Stone after identifying her as an underground leader of the Communist Party.
- November 17 – General J. Lawton Collins announces that he is negotiating with both France and Vietnam to get the pair of governments to authorize the United States undertaking "basic responsibility" for the training of the army of South Vietnam.
- November 17 – President Eisenhower meets with Democratic and Republican congressional leaders to express his view that there is a need for continued collaboration between both parties on foreign affairs and national security.
- November 17 – The United States asks the Soviet Union for prevention of incidents such as the shooting down of an American plane off the north-east tip of Japan earlier that month.
- November 20 – Government officials report that the United States will have six jet fighters be flown around Panama immediately as part of a peace-keeping method in preparation of a possible armed attack on Costa Rica.
- November 20 – Senator Francis Case says that members of the Pentagon have imposed a gag of secrecy on members of the Senate as it pertains to a radar chain along the Canadian Arctic while other American officials have been allowed to make broad details about the plan public.
- November 28 – Despite the efforts of British intermediaries, Communist China rejects an American note and refuses to release 13 Americans jailed on espionage charges.
- November 29 – Congress is asked by the interstate truck industry to remove federal highway aid from states such as Ohio in the event that they continue imposing third structure taxes on trucks from out-of-state.

== 1955 ==
- February 22 – Eisenhower addresses a joint session of Congress on the need to create the Interstate Highway System
- May 14 – The Warsaw Pact is formed by the Soviet Union and communist countries in eastern Europe as a military defense organization to counter NATO.
- June 2 – During an overtime session at night, in a vote of 50 to 18, the Senate approves a foreign aid bill of $3,408,000,000 backed by Eisenhower.
- July 21 – Eishenhower delivers "Open Skies" proposal to the four-power summit in Geneva.
- September 8 – It is reported that the United States and China are close to reaching a four-point agreement on the release of American soldiers being held in China.
- September 14 – American consular officials pledge to cut red tape to ensure a speedy return of some twenty Americans expected to be released from China.
- September 14 – United States Ambassador U. Alexis Johnson announces that he will refuse discussing trade or political questions with China unless China implements the agreement on American civilians made the previous week.

== 1956 ==
- June 29 – Interstate Highway System is created.
- October 29 – Suez Crisis
- November 6 – President Eisenhower wins re-election against former Governor Adlai Stevenson from Illinois, the Democratic candidate.

== 1957 ==
- January 5 – Eisenhower Doctrine is announced.
- January 20 – Second inauguration of Dwight D. Eisenhower
- September 9 – Civil Rights Act of 1957
- October 4 – Sputnik 1 is launched, the first artificial Earth satellite.
- October 5 – The White House praises Russia's launch of an earth satellite, saying that the launch was not surprising to President Eisenhower or the government. It is disclosed that the Justice Department is considering publicizing the information that motivated President Eisenhower to send federal troops to Little Rock, Arkansas.

== 1958 ==
- January 3 – President Eisenhower meets with his cabinet on the subject of the balanced budget intended to be submitted to Congress the following month.
- January 6 – President Eisenhower meets with the National Security Council for a discussion on US strategy for the Cold War and the military aspects of his upcoming State of the Union address.
- January 9 – United States Secretary of State John Dulles answers questions from senators on the Senate Foreign Relations Committee during a closed door meeting.
- July 29 – The National Aeronautics and Space Act established NASA.
- September 2 – National Defense Education Act

== 1959 ==
- January 1 – Cuban Revolution ousts Cuban President Fulgencio Batista.
- January 3 - Alaska admitted as 49th state.
- June 19 – Eisenhower's nomination of Lewis Strauss to serve as U.S. Secretary of Commerce is defeated in the United States Senate.
- August 21 - Hawaii admitted as 50th state.

== 1960 ==
- January 1– President Eisenhower spends New Year's Day in Mamie's Cabin at the Augusta National Golf club. United States Secretary of Labor James P. Mitchell holds separate meetings with steel chief industry negotiator R. Conrad Cooper and President of the United Steel Workers Union David J. McDonald in an attempt to resolve the steel dispute. The United States Department of Agriculture is announced to have donated 2,000 bales of cotton to both Formosa and offshore islands.
- January 2– President Eisenhower spends the day working on his budget and the messages to be conveyed within his State of the Union address.
- January 5 – The United States Army announces a system of streamlined management with the intent of accelerating development of the Nike Zeus anti-missile missile with Colonel John G. Zierdt being named as deputy commander of the Army Rocket and Guided Missile Agency to oversee the program.
- January 14 – United States Secretary of the Army Wilbur M. Brucker clarifies that his remarks about the intent of the US to defend nationalist China from Chinese communist aggression was not a confirmation of a change in American policy during a press conference.
- January 21 – Through comments by Secretary of State Herter and the press spokesman of the State Department, the United States formally takes the position that Red China needs inclusion in any agreement to disarm while denying that this would require diplomatic recognition.
- January 27 – Senator Olin Johnston says he will ask the Senate to have the Eisenhower administration's plan to protect voting rights for blacks and a separate plan for the appointment of federal voting registrars turned over to the Senate Judiciary Committee.
- April 7 – Republican senators propose a medical insurance plan for the elderly during a news conference, saying they regard health insurance for those over the age of 65 as a major campaign issue.
- April 8 – The White House announces that President Eisenhower intends to travel to Augusta, Georgia for a golfing vacation and that Eisenhower hopes to go to the American League opening baseball game there.
- May 2 – President Eisenhower announces the nominations of Subversive Activities Control Board member Thomas J. Donegan and Paul A. Sweeney for membership on the Federal Power Commission.
- May 3 – President Eisenhower sends a special message to Congress urging members to forget political rivalries and work toward enacting his legislative program while cautioning against overspending.
- May 3 – Six Senate Democrats introduce a bill proposing a $6 billion standby public works and housing program intended to combat future severe recessions. It is indicated by Senators Hugh Scott and Winston L. Prouty that a rival version of the bill is being drafted by Republicans.
- May 6 – Civil Rights Act of 1960
- May 7 – President Eisenhower authorizes renewed underground atom tests to improve methods for detecting underground nuclear explosions.
- May 7 – Vice President Nixon rebukes the Democratic Party-backed health care plans and differentiates the proposals with that of the Eisenhower administration.
- May 29 – A State Department official reports that a Russian would write down anything said by Nikita Khrushchev whenever he spoke to a westerner in Paris including in private sessions.
- May 29 – Chairman of the Senate Foreign Relations Committee J. William Fulbright says that a claim of the U2 spy plane being stolen by Russians would be a better theory than the one made by President Eisenhower.
- November 8 – The 44th quadrennial presidential election occurs. Democratic nominee Senator John F. Kennedy of Massachusetts wins the 1960 presidential election against Republican nominee Vice President Richard Nixon of California. Therefore, John F. Kennedy becomes President-elect. Eisenhower is the first president to be barred from seeking a third term, due to the 22nd amendment.
- December 1 – The State Department bars aliens living within the US from traveling to communist areas and requires them to obtain permits to reenter the US before leaving for the trip.
- December 2– Vice President Nixon and Governor of New York Nelson Rockefeller hold an hour and a half meeting pledging future collaborations. The US officially designates the government of Cuba as communist controlled.
- December 3– President Eisenhower directs President-elect Kennedy to be greeted with military pomp at his upcoming White House visit.
- December 6– President Eisenhower meets with President-elect Kennedy for discussions on major national issues.
- December 7– Press Secretary Hagerty denies President Eisenhower was indisposed with a stomach ache the previous night after reports emerged. President Eisenhower attends a luncheon for the American National Red Cross.

== 1961 ==
- January 17 – President Eisenhower delivers his farewell address; warns of the military–industrial complex.
- January 20 – John F. Kennedy is inaugurated as the 35th president of the United States, at noon EST.

== See also ==
- Timeline of the Harry S. Truman presidency, for his predecessor
- Timeline of the John F. Kennedy presidency, for his successor
