= Timeline of the Lyndon B. Johnson presidency =

The presidency of Lyndon B. Johnson began on November 22, 1963, when Lyndon B. Johnson became the 36th president of the United States following the assassination of President John F. Kennedy. His term ended on January 20, 1969.

== 1963 ==
- November 22 – Following the assassination of President John F. Kennedy, Johnson becomes the president of the United States. He is sworn in on Air Force One while the plane is still in Dallas, with former First Lady Jacqueline Kennedy at his side.
- November 27 – President Johnson addresses a joint session of Congress calling on legislators to fulfill Kennedy's legacy and pass civil rights and tax legislation, delivering the "Let Us Continue" speech.
- November 29 – The Warren Commission is created by President Johnson after signing Executive Order 11130.
- December 17 – Clean Air Act

== 1965 ==
- January 1 – The White House announces that President Johnson has ordered an inquiry by the government into increases in selective steel prices.
- January 3 – President Johnson attends church services and visits the grave of the late President John F. Kennedy.
- January 4 – President Johnson delivers the 1965 State of the Union Address to a joint session of Congress, launching the Great Society program and saying additional ideas will be sent to Congress within six weeks.
- January 20 – Johnson is sworn into his full term as President of the United States by Supreme Court Chief Justice Earl Warren. Hubert Humphrey is sworn in for his full term as Vice President.
- March 15 – President Johnson delivers a speech before a joint session of Congress, urging them to support the Voting Rights Act. He references the song "We Shall Overcome", commonly used by the American civil rights movement.
- March 20 – President Johnson federalizes the Alabama National Guard and orders them to protect civil rights marchers in the third Selma to Montgomery march.
- March 26 – President Johnson delivers televised remarks announcing the arrests of Klansmen responsible for the murder of civil rights activist Viola Liuzzo.
- April 7 – President Johnson delivers his "Peace Without Conquest" speech, declaring US support in assisting South Vietnam to prevent its military conquest by North Vietnam.
- April 28 – President Johnson deploys U.S. military forces to the Dominican Republic to protect U.S. civilians during the Dominican Civil War and to stabilize the nation against potential communist rebels.
- June 14 – The White House displays the work of American artists at the White House Festival of the Arts.
- July 14 – President Johnson signs the Older Americans Act.
- July 28 – President Johnson announces further deployment of U.S. military forces to Vietnam, raising U.S. presence there to 125,000 men and increasing the monthly draft call to 35,000.
- July 30 – Social Security Amendments of 1965
- August 9 – President Johnson accepts a proposal from William Womack Heath to build the Lyndon B. Johnson Presidential Library in Austin, Texas.
- August 10 – Housing and Urban Development Act
- August 11 – Watts riots result in 34 deaths, over 1,000 injuries, and widespread property damage and looting in Los Angeles.
- September 10 – President Johnson visits New Orleans shortly after it was struck by Hurricane Betsy, which flooded over 3/4ths of the city.
- October 3 – Immigration and Nationality Act
- November 8 – Higher Education Act

== 1966 ==
- January 6 – The text of a telegram by President Johnson to Carl Sandburg is released on the bulletin board in the White House's Press Room.
- January 6 – The text of a telegram by President Johnson to the ailing Chester Nimitz is released on the bulletin board in the Press Room.
- January 7 – President Johnson issues a statement on the members of the Advisory Council on Insured Loans to Students.
- January 7 – President Johnson issues Proclamation 3696, a termination of increased duty on clinical thermometers imports.
- January 10 – President Johnson releases a statement mourning the death of Prime Minister of India Lal Bahadur Shastri.
- January 10 – In a statement, President Johnson announces the appointment of James L. Goddard for Commissioner of the Food and Drug Administration.
- January 11 – President Johnson issues Executive Order 11265, amending a prior executive order to establish the National Defense.
- January 12 – President Johnson delivers the 1966 State of the Union Address to a joint session of Congress.
- January 13 – President Johnson holds his fifty-third news conference in the Fish Room during the afternoon. President Johnson answers questions from reporters on the District of Columbia, Vietnam, Housing and Urban Development Department, women in military service, and continuation of American peace efforts.
- February 5 – President Johnson meets with South Vietnamese officials, including prime minister Nguyễn Cao Kỳ and head of state Nguyễn Văn Thiệu, in Honolulu, Hawaii to discuss the Vietnam War.
- February 8 – President Johnson releases the Honolulu Declaration.
- March 28 – President Johnson signs H.R. 8030 to abolish the Postal Savings System
- July 4 – President Johnson signs the Freedom of Information Act into law.
- September 9 – President Johnson signs the National Traffic and Motor Vehicle Safety Act, noting that more Americans were being killed by automobile accidents than the ongoing conflict in Vietnam.
- October 15 – Black Panther Party is established.
- November 1 – President Johnson attends the dedication of Johnson Hill in Korea.
- November 1 – President Johnson arrives at Elmendorf Air Force Base in Anchorage, Alaska, delivering remarks on his last visit to the state and states his satisfaction with the state's choice of representatives in Congress.
- November 1 – President Johnson delivers remarks to American and Korean service members on American involvement in World War II and contemporary foreign policy issues in the Mess Hall, Camp Stanley.
- November 2 – President Johnson delivers remarks at Dulles International Airport on the four goals the seven nations that conferred during the Manila Conference agreed to and his views on developments abroad outside of American involvement.
- November 2 – President Johnson signs the Fish Protein Concentrate Act into law in the Ballroom at the Anchorage Westward Hotel. Johnson says the legislation "will make it possible to apply the results of research from the laboratory to the economic large-scale production of a wholesome, nutritious protein concentrate."
- November 2 – President Johnson addresses the Korean National Assembly reflecting on American intervention in the Korean War and speaks on advancements being taken on by the region under the leadership of President Park Chung-hee.
- November 3 – The White House announces President Johnson will undergo abdominal and throat surgery within the following fifteen days.
- November 3 – President Johnson signs two bills authorizing over 10 billion in federal aid for education, adding that the legislation represents an investment in America's youth.
- November 3 – American spokesmen confirm American warships have relocated to the shipping channels off the coast of North Vietnam along with the US forces and shore batteries having exchanged fire.
- November 30 – In a letter to Chairman of the National Advisory Council on the Education of Disadvantaged Children Meredith Wilson, President Johnson states his appreciation for the report on the summer education programs for disadvantaged children and actions relating to it being taken by the administration.
- November 30 – In a statement, President Johnson says the reorganization of the Bureau of Prisons "results from our concern over the high rate of crime among previous offenders and our determination to do something about it" and notes figures that support the notion that reducing repeat offenders will decrease the crime rate.
- December 7 – The White House announced that an agreement had been reached between United Nations member states on the Outer Space Treaty.

== See also ==
- Timeline of the John F. Kennedy presidency, for his predecessor
- Timeline of the Richard Nixon presidency, for his successor
