= 1987 Lebanon general strike =

- Part of Lebanese Civil War
- Date: 5 November 1987 – 10 November 1987
- Location: Lebanon
- Goals: An end to the civil war; Resolution of the economic crisis
- Methods: Strike action

Parties
General Confederation of Lebanese Workers	Government of Lebanon

The 1987 Lebanon general strike was a 5-day general strike in Lebanon in November 1987. The first general strike in Lebanon since the 1952 Lebanon general strike, the strike was called in opposition to the Lebanese Civil War and the ongoing economic crisis in the country.

== Background ==
The Lebanese Civil War began in 1975 and continued through the 1980s, with a wide range of different domestic and foreign factions opposing each other, including the majority right-wing and Christian Lebanese Front, the Israel Defense Forces, the majority left-wing and pan-Arabist Lebanese National Movement, the Palestine Liberation Organization, the Syrian Armed Forces, the right-wing Islamist Hezbollah, the Lebanese Armed Forces, and the United Nations Interim Force in Lebanon, among others. The civil war included occupations of part of the country by both Israel and Syria.

== History ==
=== Prelude ===
In 1987, Lebanon was undergoing a severe economic crisis as well as a civil war, including significant inflation.

As the economic and the war continued, the labour movement in Lebanon agitated against both. In June 1986, the General Confederation of Lebanese Workers (in French Confédération Générale des Travailleurs Libanais (CGTL), in Arabic الإتحاد العمالي العام في لبنان) called for a national month of action "to save Lebanon from war and impoverishment." In May and September 1987, the CGTL held National General Syndical Conferences under the slogan "no to war, yes to national consensus, no to the state’s system of starvation, yes to rightful demands for livelihood." Among the demands issued by the CGTL at the conferences were implementation of a progressive taxation system, universal healthcare, increasing funding for essential services and education, an end to the occupation of Lebanon, and non-sectarian political reforms to bring a peaceful end to the civil war. October 1987 saw an indefinite strike launched by teachers in Lebanon over wages and benefits.

=== General strike ===
On 5 November 1987, over three million workers across Lebanon walked off the job, beginning the first general strike in Lebanon in 35 years. Only pharmacies, hospitals, and bakeries remained open, with a wide range of facilities being forced to shut down, including the Port of Beirut, Beirut International Airport, and newspapers across the country.

CGTL president Antoine Bechara stated that the goal of the strike was "to stop the war and end the suffering of the people," saying it was "a last chance for the authorities to do something." On the second day of the strike, Bechara warned that "now it is a peaceful strike, but we don't know what will happen tomorrow."

On 9 November, two mass demonstrations were held in Beirut, one in the east of the city and one in the west, merging together at the National Museum of Beirut to tear down barricades marking the demarcation line of the civil war. Later that day, the CGTL leadership announced that they had reached a deal with the Lebanese government after meeting with Prime Minister Salim Al-Huss to end the strike, which would include the creation of a committee to study measures to increase the value of the Lebanese currency and allocation of financial credits to help pay for school fees.

On 11 November, workers resumed work across Lebanon.

== Assessments ==
Trade unionist and author Ghassan Slaiby, who worked as a consultant for the CGTL during the strike, has attributed the failure of the strike to pressure from the armed factions taking part in the war, saying that "if you planned on continuing, you needed to know how to face violence," but the CGTL "was not ready, there was no preparation."

== Aftermath ==
In late 1989, the Taif Agreement would be signed with the aim of starting an end to the civil war, with disarmament to be done in the early 1990s. The early 1990s also saw a significant wave of strikes and protests over continuing economic difficulties in Lebanon.

== See also ==
- Labour movement in Lebanon
