= John Deere strike =

John Deere strike may refer to one of two major labor strikes at Deere & Company:

- 1986–1987 John Deere strike
- 2021 John Deere strike
