= 1987 Arab citizens of Israel general strikes =

1987 strike by Israeli-Arabs

In 1987, Arab citizens of Israel held two notable one-day general strikes. The first, named "Day of Equality," on 24 June, was held in protest against alleged discrimination and unequal status in Israeli society. The second, named "Day of Peace," on 21 December, was held in solidarity with the protests by Palestinians in the Occupied Palestinian Territories during the First Intifada.

== Background ==
Arab citizens of Israel form the largest ethnic minority inside Israel, mostly descended from the Palestinians who were not expelled in the Nakba in 1948, representing around 20% of the Israeli population. While legally full Israeli citizens with equal rights to other Israelis, there have been persistent claims of discrimination against the minority.

== June general strike ==
Day of Equality
- Date: 24 June 1987
- Location: Israel
- Goals: Equal funding for Arab municipalities; An end to exclusion of Arabs from jobs
- Methods: Strike action, general strike

Lead figures
National Council of Arab Mayors	Government of Israel

=== Day of Equality ===
In late May 1987, prominent figures in Arab communities in Israel met in the majority Arab city of Shefa-Amr and agreed to hold a general strike to protest against alleged discrimination in Israel. The figures included representatives of the National Council of Arab Mayors, the Committee for Protection of Arab Land, MKs from left-wing parties, and prominent student activists. The strike was to be called the "Day of Equality."

The immediate issue that provoked the call for a general strike was a new policy announced by the Israeli government that would give lower university tuition fees to individuals who had served in the Israel Defense Forces, which included almost all Jewish Israelis, who are conscripted, but not Arab Israelis, who are exempt from conscription. The strike call also had two wider major demands: per capita funding for municipalities equal to those of majority Jewish cities and an end to exclusion of Arab citizens of Israel from jobs. For the first, the strike organisers complained that per-capita funding for majority Jewish municipalities was over four times higher than funding for majority Arab municipalities, leading to majority Arab municipalities facing significant budget deficits and an inability to provide basic services. For the second, the strike organisers complained that the national unemployment rate for Arabs was significantly higher than for Jewish Israelis and that Arabs were persistently excluded from higher-paying jobs, government jobs, and from certain sectors of the economy. One of the most prominent sectors of exclusion was the military-industrial sector, one of the major sectors of the Israeli economy, and which Arab citizens of Israel claimed they were exlcuded from on alleged grounds of national security. Another point of contention was a overcrowding in schools, with the strike leaders for 1500 new classrooms to be built. Drop-out rates were significantly higher among the Arab population than the Jewish population, as were juvenile crime rates.

The general strike was subsequently held on 24 June, with the vast majority of Arab citizens of Israel taking part. During the strike, most schools and businesses in majority Arab cities were closed. The strike had a particular impact on the construction and hospitality sectors of the Israeli economy.

Some small protests in solidarity with the general strike were held by Palestinians in the West Bank. One Palestinian women was injured in Nablus, after Israeli soldiers opened fire with live ammunition when protestors threw stones at them. The Israeli military also ordered An-Najah National University and Al-Quds University closed to prevent students from holding solidarity demonstrations on campus.

=== Reactions ===
Nazir Mujali, spokesperson for the committee organising the strike, stated that "we are Israeli citizens like any others, and we deserve to be treated equally. If today's strike doesn't push the government to act, there will be more strikes to come." Majid Al-Haj of the University of Haifa, another member of the strike organising committee, stated that "this is the first time in our history that the Arab community has been so united around a single issue," saying that they were "no longer prepared to put up with the government's discriminatory policies." Mayor of Kafr Yasif Nimr Morcus called for the Israeli government to "draw the necessary conclusions from the strike and from the fact that the Arab leadership was united."

In an editorial, The Jerusalem Post wrote that "any sensible discussion of the status of the Arab minority in the Jewish state must start with acknowledgment" of the fact that Arab citizens of Israel were a "separate but unequal minority in Israeli society," adding that "peace itself will not bring full equality for all the citizens of this country unless the Jewish majority come overwhelmingly to feel that the stench arising from open sewers in Arab towns and villages is Israel's national shame." Yehuda Litani of The Jerusalem Post argued that "Israel's Jewish majority is faced with a choice between two values on which the state was founded: national-Zionist interests against democratic-liberal values."

Minister without portfolio Moshe Arens described the strike as "communist incitement." Arens also accused the strike of being "political" and of promoting "PLO slogans." Victor Tayar, a Jewish Israeli and former activist with the Black Panthers stated that he was surprised by the intensity of the demonstrations, saying that "I'm not afraid of the Arab countries. I'm not afraid of the West Bankers. I'm afraid of the Israeli Arabs. They hate our guts."

== December general strike ==
Day of Peace
- Part of First Intifada
- Date: 21 December 1987
- Location: Israel
- Goals: An end to Israeli repression of the First Intifada
- Methods: Strike action, general strike, stone throwing

=== Day of Peace ===
In early December 1987, four Palestinians were killed when an Israeli truck driver ran them over. The accident sparked a significant wave of protests, strikes, boycotts, and acts of civil disobedience across Palestine, the largest in Palestinian history since the beginning of the Israeli occupation in 1967, known as the First Intifada. The Israeli government responded harshly to the uprising, including mass arrests of protesting Palestinians, forced dispersal of demonstrations, forced closures of universities, and blockading of Palestinian towns. By 20 December, 19 Palestinians had been killed by Israeli forces.

The Israeli response to the Palestinian protests triggered several solidarity demonstrations among Arab citizens of Israel in the first two weeks of the Intifada, culminating in a decision by the leaders of the Arab municipalities in Israel to call a general strike. Among the major demands of the strike was an end to repression of the Palestinian Territories and the release of Palestinian political prisoners.

The general strike was held on 21 December, named the "Day of Peace," and including minutes of silence for the Palestinians in the Occupied Territories who had been killed. The vast majority of the Arab population of Israel took part in the strike. Some Syrian Druze in the occupied Golan Heights also joined the strike. Demonstrations in several cities clashed with Israeli police, throwing stones and burning tyres, as the Israeli police attempted to disperse the protests with tear gas and water cannons. All leave for Israeli police officers had been cancelled prior to the strike.

=== Reactions ===
Minister of Defence Yitzhak Rabin warned against further unrest from Arab citizens of Israel, pledging that "every legal measure — legal from Israel's point of view — is justified to put an end to it." Media advisor to the Prime Minister of Israel Avi Pazner stated that he believed that "we are entering the phase of the last convulsion" of the First Intifada, further saying that the Israeli government was "behaving with calm and restraint in dealing with the situation." A spokesperson for the Israel Defense Forces stated that "the relative restraint the Army has shown has been misinterpreted as weakness" and pledged to "act with more determination. We will increase the use of administrative measures such as detentions, curfews and expulsions."

Israeli academic and former military governor of the West Bank Zvi Elpeleg wrote that the Jewish majority in Israel had historically "made it clear to all that the Jewish majority will not tolerate nationalist expressions from the Israeli Arab minority," further saying that "it can only be hoped that within the Arab community reason will prevail over the recent outbursts of emotion." In an editorial, Maariv wrote that there was "no point preaching to, or reminding those who have already joined the strike that that their socio-economic situation is much better today than it was when the state was established," but that instead "their attention should be drawn to the dangers that ensure from the course they are currently taking." Likud MK Haim Kaufman called for the majority Arab regions inside Israel to be placed under martial law, as they had been before 1966. One group of Israeli ultranationalists led by far-right politician Meir Kahane were arrested by Israeli police after attempting to travel with weapons into the majority Arab city of Shefa-Amr during the strike.

In a 2003 paper, Ilan Aysa of the Max Stern Yezreel Valley College argued that Israeli newspapers' coverage of Arab citizens of Israel during the FIrst Intifada were broadly aligned with the "Israeli government and of the Israeli Jewish establishment, serving to transmit on their behalf messages to Israeli Arabs," with the goal of "bringing Israeli Arabs back into line." Examples of this that Aysa highlights during coverage of the December general strike a front page headline by centrist newspaper Yedioth Ahronoth of Prime Minister Yitzhak Shamir warning against agitators as well as articles by the more right-wing Maariv that emphasised links between the Palestine Liberation Organization and Arab citizens of Israel, and suggesting that Arab citizens might represent a fifth column inside Israel.

Dan Fisher of the Los Angeles Times wrote that the strike "raised fresh questions about the loyalties of Israel's 700,000 Arab citizens who make up about 17% of the country's population and who have long complained of discrimination."

== See also ==
- 1987 in Israel
- Timeline of strikes in 1987
