= Timeline of strikes in 1986 =

Strikes in different nations

In 1986, a number of labour strikes, labour disputes, and other industrial actions occurred.

== Background ==
A labour strike is a work stoppage caused by the mass refusal of employees to work. This can include wildcat strikes, which are done without union authorisation, and slowdown strikes, where workers reduce their productivity while still carrying out minimal working duties. It is usually a response to employee grievances, such as low pay or poor working conditions. Strikes can also occur to demonstrate solidarity with workers in other workplaces or pressure governments to change policies.

== Timeline ==
=== Continuing strikes from 1985 ===
- Anti-Duvalier protest movement, including strikes, against the dictatorship of Jean-Claude Duvalier in Haiti.
- 1985–1986 Delhi University strike, by Delhi University faculty in India.
- 1984 Globe Steel strike, 4-year strike by Globe Steel Corporation steelworkers in the Philippines, the longest strike in the country's history.
- 1985–1986 Hormel strike
- 1985–1986 New Bedford fishermen's strike
- 1985–86 Nuclear Fuel Services strike, 10-month strike by Nuclear Fuel Services workers.
- 1985–87 Silentnight strike, 18-month strike by Silentnight workers in the United Kingdom.
- 1985–86 Victorian nurses' strikes
- 1985–1987 Watsonville Cannery strike

=== January ===
- One-day general strike in Argentina against austerity measures.
- Wapping dispute

=== February ===
- People Power Revolution, in the Philippines.

=== March ===
- One-day general strike by Northern Irish unionists, in protest against the Anglo-Irish Agreement.
- 1986 Subic Bay Naval Base strike, 12-day strike by Filipino workers at the U.S. Naval Base Subic Bay over severance pay.
- 1986 Trans World Airlines strike, strike by Trans World Airlines flight attendants.

=== April ===
- 1986 Belgian miners' strike, by miners in Belgium over restructuring plans.
- 1986 California lawyers' strike, by 33 attorneys in California, the first strike in State Bar of California history.
- 1986 Norwegian oil workers' strike

=== May ===
- One-day general strike by Black workers in South Africa demanding that May Day be made a national holiday.

=== June ===
- One-day general strike by Black workers in South Africa to mark the 10th anniversary of the Soweto uprising.
- 1986 Ontario doctors' strike
- 1986 Weyerhaeuser strike, 7-week strike by Weyerhaeuser lumber workers in the United States.

=== July ===
- 1986 Agence France-Presse strike, 4-day strike by Agence France-Presse journalists.
- 1986 Boise Cascade strike, 76-day strike by Boise Cascade workers represented by the United Paperworkers' International Union.
- 1986 Israeli nurses' strikes, including an 18-day strike by nurses in Israel.
- Jornadas de Protesta Nacional, including a general strike in July 1986 against the Military dictatorship of Chile

=== August ===
- 1986 California wine strike
- 1986–1987 John Deere strike
- 1986 Peru bank strike, 12-day strike by bank workers in Peru.
- Strike by Sudan Airways workers calling for security guarantees following the 1986 Sudan Airways Fokker F-27 shootdown.
- 1986 USX steel strike

=== September ===
- 1986 Atlantic City casino strike

=== October ===
- 1986 General Motors South Africa strike
- 1986 Swift Packing strike
- 1986 Temple University strike, 3-week strike by Temple University faculty.

=== November ===
- 1986–1987 protests in France

=== December ===
- December 1986 Punjab general strike, 2-day general strike by Sikhs in the Pujab, in protest against the death sentences of the assassins of Indira Gandhi.
