= CGTL =

CGTL can be an abbreviation for:

- General Confederation of Labour of Luxembourg
- General Confederation of Lebanese Workers
- Continuous Green Trough Lane, a part of a Seagull intersection, also known as Florida-T intersection
