= 2021 Mercy Hospital strike =

Strike at the Mercy Hospital, Buffalo, USA

- Part of Striketober
- Date: October 1, 2021 – November 4, 2021
- Location: Buffalo, New York, United States
- Methods: Strike action

Parties
Communications Workers of America	Catholic Health

The 2021 Mercy Hospital strike was a labor strike involving nurses and hospital workers at Mercy Hospital of Buffalo, in the United States. The strike began on October 1, 2021, and ended on November 4, 2021. It began following breakdown in collective bargaining negotiations between Communications Workers of America (CWA), the union representing the workers, and the Catholic Health System.

== Background ==
The collective bargaining agreement between the workers of Mercy Hospital of Buffalo, in the city of Buffalo in the United States, expired in 2020. However, due to the onset of the COVID-19 pandemic in the United States, the workers and the hospital agreed to sign a one-year extension to the agreement in August 2020, pushing the expiry date of the agreement to September 2021.

In June 2021, the government of New York passed a law requiring hospitals to consult nurses and other workers when creating staffing plans.

== Strike ==
In mid-June, the CWA provided the media with documentation showing unsanitary conditions in the hospital and that, despite the hospital's claim that it was having difficulty finding cleaning workers, the hospital had only hired 12 out of 89 applications across March and April 2021. In late-August, the CWA held a rally outside of the hospital, protesting against the working conditions at the hospital, including mistreatment of staff. CWA Area Director Debora Hayes stated in a speech that "our equipment is broken and we'll have speakers coming up and talking about it. We need security. Our nurses are being beaten up in Emergency Rooms (cheers). We are also [one of] the lowest paid hospital in the area."

On September 20, the CWA announced that it would go on strike beginning on the first of October if a new agreement had not been reached by then. The next day, the CWA released the results of a survey of Catholic Health workers. 98 percent of the survey respondents stated that their hospital had trouble retaining staff, 96 percent thought that the organization had not taken adequate measures to solve understaffing, 77 percent had considered quitting their job, around 70 percent had witnessed patients be neglected due to understaffing, and 58 percent had been forced to do work they were not qualified for due to understaffing.

On Wednesday September 29, the hospital announced that it would be suspending nonemergency and pregnancy delivery procedures in case of a strike. The hospital president, Eddie Bratko, released a statement arguing that it would be "inconceivable that the union would lead essential health care workers on strike in the midst of an ongoing pandemic." That evening, the hospital proposed a new agreement that would include an average raise of 4.4 percent for nurses in the first year of the contract and an average raise of 2 percent for the following two years as well as leaving health insurance premiums and pension unchanged and creating an additional 230 positions in service areas.

On Thursday September 30, the collective bargaining agreement ran out. The next day, the strike began, with almost 2,000 workers, including nurses, walking off the job. The workers released a statement that day saying that "our hospital, and the hospitals throughout the Catholic Health System, are dangerously understaffed. Every day, we are terrified of needless patient deaths in our hospital because we are stretched so thin. We have bargained for months to achieve a contract agreement that will allow us to do our jobs properly, but Catholic Health stubbornly refuses to agree to iron-clad safe staffing levels."

On Saturday October 2, the hospital administration failed to show up at a negotiation meeting with the union.

On Sunday October 31, Catholic Health cancelled health benefits for striking CWA employees.

== See also ==
- 2021 Saint Vincent Hospital strike
- Strikes during the COVID-19 pandemic
