= Timeline of strikes in 1987 =

Strikes in 1987

In 1987, a number of labour strikes, labour disputes, and other industrial actions occurred.

== Background ==
A labour strike is a work stoppage caused by the mass refusal of employees to work. This can include wildcat strikes, which are done without union authorisation, and slowdown strikes, where workers reduce their productivity while still carrying out minimal working duties. It is usually a response to employee grievances, such as low pay or poor working conditions. Strikes can also occur to demonstrate solidarity with workers in other workplaces or pressure governments to change policies.

== Timeline ==
=== Continuing strikes from 1986 ===
- 1986–1987 John Deere strike
- 1986–1987 IBP strike, 7-month strike by IBP, Inc. workers in the United States.
- 1986–1987 protests in France
- 1985–87 Silentnight strike, 18-month strike by Silentnight workers in the United Kingdom.
- 1985–1987 Watsonville Cannery strike

=== January ===
- One-day general strike in Greece against government austerity policies.
- 1987 British Telecom strike, by British Telecom workers.
- Mendiola massacre
- 1987 UNAM strike, 18-day strike by students at the National Autonomous University of Mexico.
- 1987 Rutgers University strike, 3-week strike by clerical workers at Rutgers University in the United States.

=== March ===
- 1987 Ford Mexico strike, 40-day strike by Ford Motor Company workers in Hermosillo, Mexico.

=== April ===
- 1987 American Red Cross strike, 10-day strike by American Red Cross nurses, the first nurses strike in the American Red Cross's history.
- 1987 Raša strike, 33-day strike by coal miners in Raša, Istria County, Yugoslavia.

=== June ===
- 1987 Bell Helicopter strike, 3-week strike by Bell Helicopter workers in the United States.
- 1987 Canada Post strike, strike by Canada Post workers against rollbacks of working conditions and contracting out of services.
- 1987 de Havilland Canada strike, 10-week strike by De Havilland Canada workers.
- 1987–1988 International Paper strike
- June Democratic Struggle, including strikes, against the dictatorship of the Fifth Republic of Korea
- 1987 NBC strike, 17-week strike by NBC technicians, represented by the National Association of Broadcast Employees and Technicians, the longest strike in NBC history at that point.
- 1987 Screen Actors Guild strike, 5-week strike by Screen Actors Guild members.

=== July ===
- One-day strike by students at National Autonomous University of Mexico, the Universidad Autónoma Metropolitana, and the Instituto Politécnico Nacional calling for students to have a greater say in university governance.
- Great Workers' Struggle, mass wave of strikes in South Korea demanding better working conditions and autonomous unions, inspired by the June Democratic Struggle.
- July 1987 Bangladesh general strike, 54-hour general strike in Bangladesh against the military dictatorship of Hussain Muhammad Ershad.

=== August ===
- 1987 Canada rail strike, 5-day strike by railroad workers in Canada over job security, the first national rail strike in Canada since 1973.
- 1987 South African miners' strike

=== September ===
- 1987 Detroit Symphony Orchestra strike, 12-week strike by Detroit Symphony Orchestra musicians, the longest in the Symphony's history at that point.
- Metro Toronto Elementary Teacher's strike
- 1987 NFL strike
- 1987 Oregon public sector strike, 9-day rolling strikes by Oregon public sector workers, the largest public sector strike in Oregon history at that point.

=== October ===
- 1987 Israeli broadcasting strike, 52-day strike by Israeli public radio and television.

=== November ===
- One-day general strike in Italy in protest against the government's economic policies.
- 1987 Lebanon general strike, the first general strike in Lebanon in 35 years.

=== December ===
- First Intifada, including strikes, against the Israeli occupation of Palestine.
