= Striketober =

October 2021 labor strikes in the U.S.

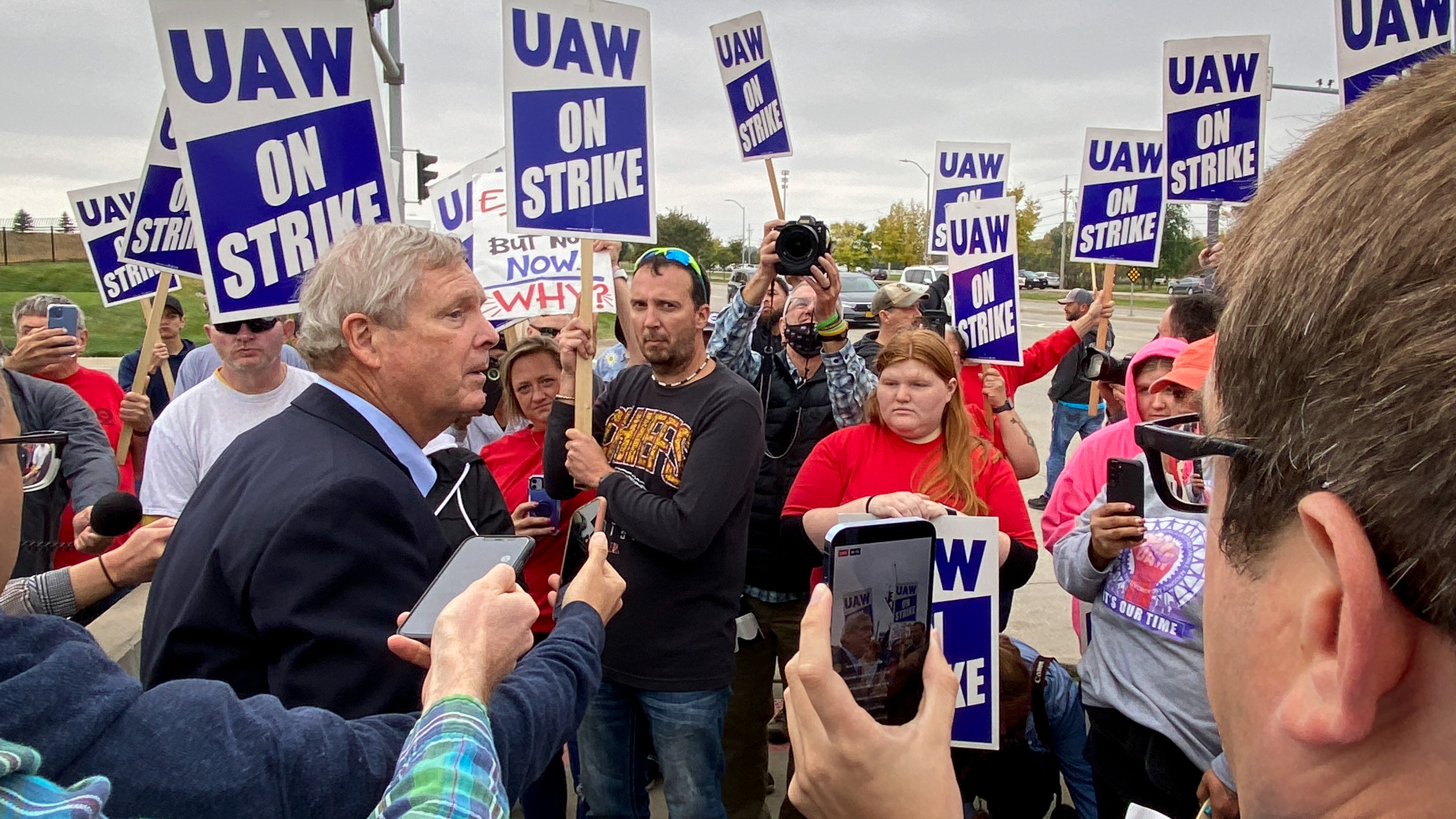
United States Secretary of Agriculture Tom Vilsack meeting with John Deere workers on strike

Striketober was a labor strike wave in October 2021 by workers in the United States in the context of strikes during the COVID-19 pandemic. During the month, approximately 25,000 workers participated in strikes.

The labor movement began with workers who were made to work long hours for low wages observing businesses making increasing profits while income inequality in the United States intensified. Due to the labor shortage of the Great Resignation – which some economists described as a general strike – workers held more leverage over companies who required additional labor.

== Background ==
The American middle class was created due to organized labor according to American historian Michael Beschloss. In the early 20th century, American workers would strike during times of economic change or crisis to earn rights and higher wages. In the 40 years preceding Striketober, organized labor had been decreasing in the United States as governmental policies and companies combatted against labor movements. Beschloss stated that since the Republican administration of President Ronald Reagan in the 1980s, organized labor had lost its bargaining power at workplaces. President Reagan's firing of 12,000 air traffic controllers who participated in the Professional Air Traffic Controllers Organization (PATCO) strike was "the beginning of the war on organized labor in this country" according to Beschloss. Into the 1990s, the Democratic Party also began to distance itself from organized labor as it sought campaign funding from corporations.

Over the period of time when participation in organized labor decreased, the wages of the average worker have remained stagnant while bosses and CEOs received larger shares of company profits; all while the profit of companies greatly increased.

=== Causes ===
Striketober began amidst the Great Resignation, a labor shortage that occurred during the COVID-19 pandemic due to the existing low wages, which some economists described as a general strike. New York wrote that the cause for the crisis was clear; "American workers are exploited, and they’ve had enough". As time progressed during the pandemic, companies continued to restrict higher wages from their workers like they had done for decades. Workers began to organize and participate in strikes as business profits rose and income inequality in the United States increased.

American workers – many paid low wages and described as "essential" during the COVID-19 pandemic – were forced into working overtime in short-staffed and underpaid conditions. Kate Bronfenbrenner, head of labor education research at the Cornell University School of Industrial and Labor Relations (ILR) explained, "Covid was a wake-up call, because it wasn't just you could get injured on the job, but going to work could kill you. ... Workers are feeling like they're working harder than ever and they put themselves out there during Covid and risked their lives for what?" Professor at University of California, Berkeley, Catherine Fisk, agreed with Bronfenbrenner's statement, saying "On the low-wage side, these workers were essential. They faced high death rates but couldn't afford housing or health care," Fisk said. "Now there's this activism borne of desperation".

Director of policy and government affairs Celine McNicholas of the Economic Policy Institute said that the workers have realized that the COVID pandemic exposed poor working conditions in the United States and that "workers are really in a system that is very much rigged against them" since companies can violate the rights of employees under current governmental regulations.

Dean of the Cornell's ILR Alex Colvin said that because of the labor shortage facing companies, workers had the potential to hold more influence over businesses by striking since the employees would be more difficult to replace.

== Timeline ==
During the Striketober period, workers from various backgrounds, including manufacturing, filmmaking, health care and others, began to organize and participate in labor strikes. Communications director of the AFL-CIO, Tim Schlittner, said that strikes would continue into 2022 through the United States mid-term elections.

As of October 15, over 100,000 workers were either on strike or preparing to strike. ABC News reported on October 22 that 43 of 255 strikes, or about 17% of strikes in 2021, occurred in October. This is compared to 54 strikes being reported in the entirety of 2020.

=== Hollywood ===
Approximately 60,000 workers from the entertainment industry were about to strike on October 18. However, the International Alliance of Theatrical Stage Employees (IATSE) managed to reach a tentative agreement with Hollywood producers for better working conditions and pay, averting the strike.

=== Nabisco strike ===
The first major strike that occurred shortly before Striketober was the Nabisco strike, when the Bakery, Confectionery, Tobacco Workers and Grain Millers' International Union (BCTGM) disagreed with an existing labor agreement with Nabisco. The strike resulted with workers higher pay, a $5,000 bonus, increased 401(k) contributions from Nabisco and the blocking of a proposed tiered-pay system opposed by workers.

=== First strikes ===
On October 1, the 2021 Mercy Hospital strike in Buffalo, New York began when hundreds of nurses belonging to the Communications Workers of America did not reach agreements with Catholic Health. The same day, 450 workers of Special Metals Corporation began a strike in Huntington, West Virginia.

=== Kellogg's strike ===
The first large-scale strike to occur during Striketober was the 2021 Kellogg's strike, with about 1,400 beginning their strike on October 4. BCTGM workers employed by Kellogg's disagreed with the employee benefits presented in a new labor contract. Workers demand an end to the two-tiered system of "legacy" and "transitional" workers, which leaves the latter with a big wage gap, long workweeks, required overtime and poor holiday pay.

=== John Deere strike ===
On October 14, 2021, the John Deere strike began when workers belonging to the United Auto Workers did not reach an agreement with John Deere regarding increased wages, pensions and removing a tiered employee structure. A total of about 10,000 John Deere workers participated in the strike.

=== Healthcare strikes ===
In the United States, dangerous working conditions, occupational burnout and overall dissatisfaction among healthcare workers has resulted in hospital staff shortages. Shortages of staff were reported before the COVID pandemic and grew worse amid the pandemic.

In California, thousands of healthcare workers began to or planned to strike as staffing shortages occurred in about one in three hospitals throughout the state. The staffing shortages were compounded by higher demand due to the COVID pandemic. Unions representing healthcare workers reported that healthcare facilities hired traveling staff, such as travel nurses, to fill understaffed positions and paid the traveling staff higher wages.

=== McDonald's strikes ===
Workers of McDonald's in ten cities across the United States announced a strike to begin on October 26 in protest against sexual harassment incidents that allegedly occurred in multiple locations. Fight for $15 supporters and others encouraged McDonald's workers to start unions while participating in the strike.

=== Higher education strikes ===
Graduate student workers at Columbia University and Harvard University, both members of the United Auto Workers, voted to begin striking in October 2021 in response to stagnation at the bargaining table. Workers belonging to the Student Workers of Columbia cited the university's inability to reach a first contract after two years of collective bargaining, including provisions such as a living wage, protection from harassment, and dental insurance, as necessitating the strike. At Harvard, workers began a three-day strike on October 27 as part of a push to negotiate a stronger contract. The Harvard Graduate Students Union had previously signed a one-year contract with the university, which many members felt was inadequate.

=== Other actions ===
In Staten Island, New York, workers at Amazon warehouses organized the Amazon Labor Union (ALU) and began their registration process with the National Labor Relations Board to achieve recognition. ALU organized themselves to achieve higher wages, safer work conditions and more vacation time. Kelly Nantel, a spokesperson for Amazon, shared opposition to a potential unionization saying the business "made great progress in recent years and months in important areas like pay and safety".

== Effects ==
Striketober has brought more attention to the proposed Protecting the Right to Organize Act (PRO Act). Bronfenbrenner said that the passing of the PRO Act would help protect workers on strike from being fired by businesses.

== Public opinion ==
At the time of Striketober, Yahoo! News noted that the support for unions was at its highest level since 1965, citing a Gallup poll from September 2021 that showed 68 percent of American respondents supported worker unions.

== Reactions ==
President Joe Biden has said that he supports the worker's right to strike, but that he is "not going to get into the negotiation." White House officials have also said that Biden wanted to leave workers and their employers to resolve both of their own labor disputes.
