= John Chase Lord =

American Presbyterian minister, lawyer and writer

- Pastor of the Central Presbyterian Church in Buffalo
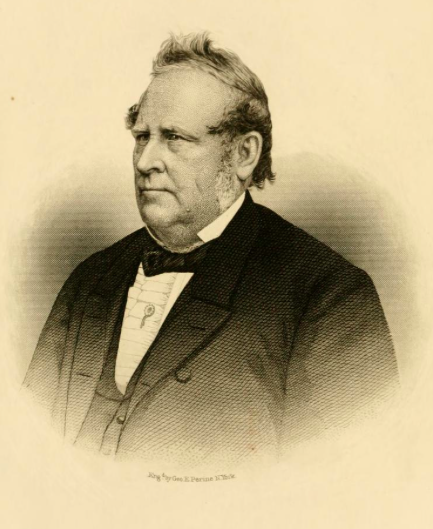
- Engraving of John C. Lord by Geoffrey E. Perine of New York.
- Church: Presbyterian Church in the United States of America
- Opposed to: Catholicism, immigration to the United States, slavery

Orders
- Ordination: September 1833

Personal details
- Born: 9 August 1805 Washington, New Hampshire, United States
- Died: 21 January 1877 (aged 71) Buffalo, New York, United States
- Buried: Forest Lawn Cemetery, Buffalo, New York
- Denomination: Presbyterianism
- Residence: Buffalo, New York
- Parents: Rev. John Way Lord; Sarah Chase
- Spouse: Mary E. Johnson (1829-)
- Education: Doctor of Divinity
- Alma mater: Hamilton College, Madison College, Auburn Seminary

John Chase Lord, AM (9 August 1805 – 21 January 1877) was an American Presbyterian minister, lawyer, writer, and poet well known for his involvement in the nativist and anti-Catholic movements in Upstate New York during the mid-1800s. He was also a leading theologian of conservative Presbyterianism in the mid-19th century, serving as Moderator of the 63rd General Assembly of the Presbyterian Church in the United States of America in 1852.

== Early life ==
John Chase Lord was born in Washington, New Hampshire on 9 August 1805 to parents Reverend John Way Lord, a Congregational minister and Sarah Chase. Born in Cornish, New Hampshire, his mother was a cousin of Salmon P. Chase, Chief Justice of the Supreme Court. He had four brothers, two who became clergymen: Claudius Buchanan Lord, who later became a Presbyterian minister in Springfield, New York, and William Wilberforce Lord, who grew up to be an Episcopal priest and writer in Vicksburg, Mississippi, and two who became lawyers: Charles Backus Lord, Judge of the Circuit Court of St. Louis, Missouri, and Scott Lord, who established the law firm of Lord & Lord in New York City.

When he was five, his family moved to the small Town of Burlington in Otsego County, New York. It was there that Lord began his education, at a local public elementary school. At age 12, he transferred to Union Academy, a boarding school in Plainfield, New Hampshire. Union Academy was founded by his uncle, Hon. Daniel Kimball, and its current title, Kimball Union Academy, bears his name. He stayed at Union Academy for three years, graduating with a class of 40 boys and five girls. He then went to Madison Academy, and later Madison College. At age 17, he went off to Hamilton College in Clinton, New York. Not caring for athletics, his two years at Hamilton were his formative intellectual years. He began writing poetry, and placed reading books of his personal interests above his class reading assignments, which was the reason for his mediocre grades.

During his college years, Lord was not a Christian and generally hostile to religion. He wrote in a memoir:

Like Augustine in the years when he studied at Carthage, he gave promise of an enemy, rather than a friend of Jesus of Nazareth. He was never dissolute, but during his collegiate course, and for some years after, he was thoroughly indifferent, and did whatever his tastes led him to believe would be pleasurable.

== Law career ==
After two years at Hamilton, Lord's growing disaffection with college life caused him to suddenly move to Canada with a friend, where he became editor-in-chief of a national newspaper, The Canadian. After just one year in that position, he decided to move back to the United States and specifically Buffalo. In his diary, he cites finances as a reason; indeed, when he arrived in Buffalo, he had enough money for just a single meal and only one night's stay in a hotel. Almost immediately after his arrival, he was hired by the law firm of Love & Tracy, then the preeminent lawyers of western New York. He quickly became a popular figure, and well respected by Buffalo society, and was chosen to represent the city in the United States semi-centennial celebrations. In 1825, at Buffalo's quarter-century celebrations, he was also chosen to speak, in which he recounted the more colorful side of Buffalo's history, recalling a panther killed in the street, the city's vicious rivalry with nearby Black Rock during its village years, and the construction of the Erie Canal.

To supplement his income, he started an academy on Main Street for one winter, and, because of his respected status, it was quite successful, producing many of Buffalo's important citizens at the time. He was made Deputy Clerk of Erie County in 1827, and on 18 February 1828 was admitted to the Bar. On 9 December 1828, he married his first sweetheart, Mary Elizabeth Johnson, the daughter of Dr. Ebenezer Johnson, who later became the first Mayor of Buffalo. The eloped with only the Lord parents present, as the Johnson's opposed their daughter's marriage. They later changed their minds and became great friends with Lord.

== Conversion and ministry ==
During this period of his life, Lord attended First Presbyterian Church, at the time the only of its denomination in Buffalo, and was elected a trustee of the congregation. Despite his clear involvement with the church, he was still not yet a deeply committed Christian, never publicly speaking at services. However, Lord's biography reports that he truly "converted" to the Christianity for unknown reasons, and offered public prayer at services one day. When his mother learned of this, she reportedly cried of happiness, and said that she was now "ready to depart in peace."

In his new religious fervor, Lord felt the calling to become a minister, and in 1830, enrolled in Auburn Seminary. After graduating in 1833, he ministered in Fayetteville, New York for several months. In September 1833, he was ordained and installed minister of Presbyterian Church of Geneseo in Livingston County, New York. From his seminary years on, Lord was known as an especially orthodox and earnestly dogmatic in his adherence to Calvinism, which he considered as truest of any Christian branch. His congregations were generally enthusiastic to receive him as a minister, for he was known as intelligent and charismatic.

In 1835, the Buffalo Presbytery voted to establish a second church in addition to the First Presbyterian Church in Buffalo. Known as the Pearl Street Presbyterian Church, it began with 33 members who had transferred from First Church, and Lord was appointed as its first minister. Upon arrival, he described the new church building: "The edifice was rudely constructed of hemlock boards doubled upon scantling, and filled in with tan-bark. It cost about three hundred dollars."

He did not desire this new post, instead hoping to pursue missionary work in Mississippi, but accepted out of duty. His first sermon to his new flock was in November 1835. A year later, the youthful, quickly growing congregation had constructed a superior church structure, costing $30,000 (Equivalent to $749,456 in 2015). He set to work creating a vibrant community at the church, creating a large choir featuring brass instruments, and offered many of the fiery sermons that made him so famous. He quickly became more popular than the Pearl Street Church, offering praise for Buffalo and its citizens, but also criticism of their common sins, that other preachers overlooked.

In 1836, he was honored as a New York representative to the General Assembly of the Presbyterian Church in the United States of America. The next year, the liberal and conservative factions, commonly called the Old and New Schools, of the Church split into two autonomous wings that would not reunite until 1869. During these tumultuous times, Lord's church was the sole bastion of Presbyterian traditionalist beliefs in Buffalo. His alma mater, Hamilton College, awarded him an honorary Doctor of Divinity in 1841.

In 1849, Lord spoke in his Quarter Century Sermon, spoke of Buffalo's experience of the cholera epidemic:

During my ministry in this city, we have at various times been visited by the pestilence which walketh in the darkness. No advent of cholera during my pastorate, has been so severe as 1849. This disease commenced its ravages early in June of that year, and did not wholly disappear before the month of November. At times, the number of deaths was from forty to fifty in a day. A general gloom spread over the city; men looked anxiously in each other's faces; those who were in full health to-day were coffined on the morrow. Every day the names of some well-known citizens were catalogued among the dead. Many who were attacked and recovered, were reported for a time as deceased. More than once I was saluted joyfully in the streets by some friend that had heard that I was dead. It was in truth, a time of mourning, lamentation, and woe; and the sadness of the people was like that of the ancient Hebrews in the valley of Hadad-rimmon. The remembrances of that disastrous summer will never be effaced from my mind.

Lord began the year 1850 with his famous New Year's Sermon, widely published by local newspapers for its eloquence:

The impressions made upon the sands by the current of human actions and human passions during the year that is passed, are now hardened and fixed in stone. As the soft substance of clay, receiving the impression of the waters and marking their motion, course and flow, becomes at length a rock, whose imperishable engravings are read by succeeding generations; and as the growth and products of trees and plants, and the anatomy of animals at different ages, make their impressions on earth, which, anon, hardening into stone, reveals their forms and characteristics to subsequent periods, so the tablets of time passed, retain and reveal the actions, the passions, the events, which are to be fully disclosed when the strata shall be broken up, and the deposit of different ages, and every race, shall be read in the great day of final revelation. This is the true eternity of temporal things. Who would think that the yielding things, in which the foot-step of the passer-by leaves its impression, should reveal that foot-print a thousand years afterward, to the men of a remote generation? Who would believe, unless it had been so abundantly proven, that the figures, wrought in the soft clay made in sport, which the next rain might be expected to wash away, should appear in another age, graven in a rock as with a pen of iron? These results science has demonstrated in a natural world. They are in the moral world indicated by experience, and attested by revelation. What an extraordinary and beautiful analogy this is. As in the natural world the most minute traces of the lowest forms of life and action, are disclosed by a process at once universal and exact; so, the words we speak, the actions we perform, falling upon the sand remain fixed in an eternal record. Philosophers say, that the earth retains and reverberates every uttered sound forever. We make our thoughts, our words and our actions, in time, our companions through eternity. With what importance does this view clothe the life that now is; with what power of things, which we are apt to regard as idle dreams, which seem to perish as they pass, but whose shadows, falling on the curtains of eternity, are fastened forever. What an event is the beginning of a new year, in which we are to write for the world to come on the strata of which—to pursue our [geology|geological] figure—all actions are to be graven, as with the point of a diamond upon a tablet of adamant, for an everlasting record. How do these thoughts dignify the passing moment, and the passage of the years of time, on whose fleeting sands are written the enduring records, which, for good or ill, we are to read throughout the cycles of our endless existence.

By now a nationally famous figure in theology, his lectures titled "The Land of Ophir," "The Progress of Civilization," "The Star Aldebaran," "The War of the Titans," and "The Romance of History" were published as a collection in 1851.

After years serving as a delegate, John Lord was chosen as the Moderator of the 63rd General Assembly of the Presbyterian Church in the United States of America in 1852, which took place in Charleston, South Carolina.

Also in 1852 was the completion of the new Central Presbyterian Church in Buffalo, which housed the congregation of the former Pearl Street Presbyterian Church, and the construction of which began in 1848. The new church was at the time the largest place of worship in western New York, an ovular structure filled with natural lighting. A newspaper at the time described it as "not unlike the famous City Temple of London."

During the winter 1859-1860, Lord took six months off from his duties at Central Presbyterian Church, staying in Mobile, Alabama and preaching weekly at the Government Street Presbyterian Church. He returned to Buffalo just prior to the outbreak of the Civil War. Lord's loyalties were strongly Unionist. While he had defended the legality of slavery in earlier years, he had also always been an implacable critic of the practice itself.

=== Sisters of Charity Hospital ===
The Roman Catholic Diocese of Buffalo was created in 1847, and Bishop John Timon, its first prelate, immediately saw the lack of an organized healthcare system in the City of Buffalo. There were some private clinics, but no large central hospital, public or private. The city's mainly Protestant and nativist leadership, of whom John C. Lord was the de facto leader did not adequately address the healthcare needs of the rapidly growing and mostly Catholic working class, partly due to prejudice. Some did try to establish a Protestant hospital, but efforts faded away for lack of popular interest. Bishop Timon took efforts into his own hands, traveling to Baltimore in March 1848, seeking a religious order to administer the new hospital. The Sisters of Charity (now known as the Daughters of Charity) agreed to the task, and on 3 June 1848,^{[3]} eight Sisters of Charity, Sisters Ursula Mattingly, Ann de Sales Farren, Hieronimo O'Brien, Anacaria Hoey, Clare McDurby, Mary Aloysia Lilly, Mary Eliza Dougherty, and Agatha O'Keefe,^{[4]} arrived in Buffalo. On 1 October 1848, Sisters of Charity Hospital officially opened as the city's first large healthcare facility, under the leadership of Sister Ursula Mattingly, DC.^{[3]} The first patients were a group of six sailors.

Very little attention at first was given to the hospital originally, with The Buffalo Morning Express reporting the news simply by writing: "The city is well received in having a hospital for its own."^{[6]} The New York State Legislature provided funding for sectarian hospitals in locations where there were no nonsectarian hospitals, and Sisters of Charity Hospital was eligible for and received $9,000 (equivalent to $266,667 in 2015 dollars). The state funding was done rather inconspicuously, and the news only gained attention a few months later, when some of Buffalo's Protestant doctors protested the state funding of a Catholic institution as the city's first hospital.

Tensions were high in New York at this time due to the recent Seneca Falls Convention, at which 68 women and 32 men out of 300 attendees signed the now-famous Declaration of Sentiments, which listed men's abuses of women's freedom and rights. The event was still fresh in the minds of the people of New York, and the Protestant men of Buffalo felt threatened, increasing their strong objection to the educated, Catholic females who were running a now-state funded hospital. Buffalo's elite began speaking out against the Sisters Hospital and its state funding, criticizing its all-female leadership, lack of physicians' influence in decision making, and small staff. In early February 1850, Protestant doctors Josiah Trowbridge, Austin Flint, and James White privately complained to Lord, possibly Buffalo's most influential citizen at the time, about the administration of the hospital, arguing that three Sisters alone was not proper for the management of an entire hospital. He was enraged, seeing it not only as a religious threat but a political concern.

==== Letter-writing feud ====
On 16 February 1850, the Saturday edition of The Buffalo Morning Express published an anonymous letter to the editor condemning the state legislature for providing public funding for Sisters of Charity Hospital "without securing the rights of the public therein or requiring any of the usual guarantees of the appropriation of that money. Much dissatisfaction has been felt and expressed in regard to the actions of the legislature."^{[8]} The letter was written by Lord under his admitted pseudonym "Constituents". The inflammatory message resulted in a series of letters from both the Diocese of Buffalo and "Constituents", all published by The Buffalo Morning Express, a Whig Party-dominated and strongly anti-Catholic publication. Bishop Timon expressed dismay when shown the letter, and two days later The Buffalo Morning Express published a reply letter, in which he wrote that the Sisters of Charity Hospital was an "institution resting on the broad lines of charity, without reference to creed, color or country." Lord wrote a heated letter in reply, calling the idea of the hospital as charitable "ridiculous". He contended that the hospital funding was granted to win political favor, as it was granted just prior to an election. Bishop Timon responded with a letter implying that bigotry towards the charity of the Catholic Church is the reason for the letters written by "Constituents."

Lord, through his pseudonym, responded in his own defense, stating that "Roman Catholic institutions, charitable if they please to call them so" are not what is opposed by Protestants, only the fact that the state legislature is "[funding] not a public hospital but a Roman Catholic one," and were "willing to do for the Papists what they have never done for their own religious institutions." He accused the government of being in collaboration with the Catholic Church, arguing that the funding was illegal. He warned that Sisters of Charity Hospital would make "citizens become subjects of Romish magic," and asked "are Roman Catholics to be almoners of Protestant charities to the poor and destitute?" In another letter, he asserted that the hospital funding was illegal because "not a single Protestant is in the Corporation or has any supervision of its affairs." In the Christian Advocate, a Protestant newspaper at which Lord was editor, he questioned why anyone who defends the Constitution "will be willing to be taxed to build up an institution the control of which is beyond the votes of a free republican people." Vicar General Fr. O'Reilly responded with a letter the next day reminding that the hospital existed to provide "corporeal mercy" for the sick and injured and that "the doors of that institution are as free to the clergy of one denomination of believers as they are to that of another."

In yet another letter, Lord wrote falsehoods about the Sisters and the hospital: "... had not the migrating body of sisters abandoned their location in another state ... May not the hospital here be closed at any time by the departure of its inmates to a new locality?" He also accused the Sisters of providing Catholic priests for patients who requested Protestant ministers and of offering patients free treatment if they converted to Catholicism. In reality, Bishop Timon, carefully recognizing the risk of proselytizing in such a hostile area, specifically forbad the Sisters of Charity from ever mentioning religion to Protestants unless one initiated the topic independently. He then published the statements of two former patients, who testified that Sister Ursula Mattingly, the director of the hospital, improperly treated non-Catholic patients, was not "properly trained in the medicines," and was a foreigner. One, named Michael Murphy, swore out an affidaviton 1 March 1850. He reported that Lord offered him clothes and enough money to travel to Canada, where he was relocating, if he would tell the "emigrant agent office" that he was treated poorly by the Sisters of Charity.

While Bishop Timon's and "Constituents"' letters were prolific during the month of February, by March Buffalo had a more pressing concern: a cholera epidemic was reaching its height after several months. Bishop Timon abruptly ceased responding to Lord's public letters; he was too busy with his efforts procuring additional state funding to expand the hospital. Also on his mind was the longterm missions of literally building a diocese from the ground up. New parishes, schools, colleges, seminaries, and an orphanage were needed to serve the growing Catholic population, who now made up more than half the population of Buffalo. Lord published one last attack in The Buffalo Morning Express on 2 March 1850, warning local Protestants that Catholic priests and nuns seek "the conversion of Protestant children to the Romish faith." He warned, "beware of the Romish priesthood," claiming they ignore their vows of celibacy and use the Catholic Church for profit.

In 1850, after months of public feuding between the Catholic and Protestant leaders of Buffalo, the New York State Legislature passed multiple bills denying additional funding to Sisters of Charity Hospital. The laws were pushed through by State Assemblyman John Putnam, a close friend of Lord, who wrote of the events in his memoir, "the apostate and tyranny of Rome was discovered and the State wisely chose to listen to the people for there is a law greater than the Constitution."

== Later life and death ==
During the American Civil War, he served as Chaplain of the Union Continentals from 1861 to 1865.

According to his biography, from 1868 on he began to feel overburdened by his pastorate, as his church was very large with only a single minister. This led to the 1870 hiring of Rev. A. L. Benton from Lima, New York. However, the co-pastor was lost in 1872, when Benton accepted a new position ministering at the Fredonia Presbyterian Church of Fredonia, New York. By now an older man, and with the difficult task on ministering to a large church without any help, Lord felt the need to leave the position of pastor to someone else. In September 1873, his resignation was reluctantly accepted by the Central Presbyterian Church, after 38 years as pastor.

Following his retirement, Lord had the honor of traveling to Cleveland, Ohio as Commissioner to the General Assembly of the Presbyterian Church in the United States of America. He cofounded a local Society for the Prevention of Cruelty to Animals, and spent much time and money on the organization. He continued attending Central Presbyterian Church when his health permitted. In the fall of 1876, Lord's health began to fail, and he acknowledged that his time was near. For two days he was unconscious, and on the evening of Sunday, 21 January 1877, he died, surrounded by his parishioners. The Revs. A. T. Chester and D. R. Frazer spoke at his funeral, with Rev. Charles Wood officiating the service.

== Beliefs ==
Addressing Hamilton College students, Lord spoke of the necessity of the inclusion of the supernatural in Christian theology:

In the nineteenth century, the grand hindrance to the progress of the Gospel is to be found in the perversion, obscuration, or open denial of the supernatural element of Christianity. The philosophy of Locke and his followers, and of Hobbes and Bentham, who have superadded the utilitarian scheme to the materialism of the former, are thought by their admirers to have disenchanted the universe of the spiritual and supernatural. There is no longer a 'divinity that stirs within us,' or without us. The innate and ideal are consigned to the tomb of the Capulets, and the mine and the cotton factory are the divinities of the mountain and rivulet. Of the effect of this philosophy upon the fine arts, this is not the time nor place to speak; it is enough to say, that this philosophy is more grossly material than polytheistic, which though it could not elevate man religiously, at least preserved his reverence for the supernatural, his conceptions of the ideal, and gave to the world those miracles of art, or, to use the words of one of our own poets: 'Those forms of beauty seen no more, yet once to art's rapt vision given.'

A strong critic of Islam, in his lecture "The Romance of History," Lord defended the Crusades and harshly condemned the control of the Holy Land by Muslims, and also encouraged the conversion of the Jews:

How is it that the Christian, and the Hebrew have alike suffered the soil sacred to both, to remain cursed by Mahomedan hordes, and all her sacred places dishonored, and blasphemed by the sign of the crescent? There is no other explanation than the prophecies of the Bible, which declare that Judea must remain in the hands of the spoiler, and the abomination of desolation continue in the holy place, until the set time for the return of the Hebrew, when he shall acknowledge him whom his fathers crucified; and so to-day, the Mosque of Omar stands on the site of the temple, and the Christian pilgrim must pay a price to behold the sacred places of Jerusalem; he must undergo the scrutiny of a bearded Turk before he can kneel at the sepulchre of the Saviour.

Lord publicized his view opposing slavery during the early 1850s, with a sermon published in newspapers in which he concludes that although God does not condone the practice, citizens have no right to oppose it as a legal and constitutional institution. The sermon caused a national controversy, as some incorrectly interpreted Lord's view as being that the government can essentially make any sinful action legal or mandatory, including murder and theft, among others. He was called a Judas and a Benedict Arnold, although the controversy simmered out fairly quickly as his true views became clarified. Indeed, he was eventually commended by fellow clerics, and by President Millard Fillmore, who sent him the following letter:

Washington, D.C., Jan. 13, 1851

Rev. J. C. Lord,

My Dear Sir: "The cares of state" leave me no time for general reading, and it was not till this evening, that I found leisure to peruse your admirable sermon on the "Higher Law and Fugitive Slave Bill." I return you my thanks, most cordially and sincerely, for this admirable discourse. You have rendered the nation a great and valuable service, and I am highly gratified to learn, that thousands and tens of thousands have been reprinted in New York, and sent here, and are now being distributed under the franks of members of Congress. It cannot fail to do good. It reaches a class of people of excellent intentions, but somewhat bigoted prejudices, who could be reached in no other way. Again I thank you for the service you have done my country, and am

Truly yours,

Millard Fillmore.

== Bibliography ==
- Annual address by the Rev. John C. Lord, D. D.: Preachers, pedagogues and poets of Buffalo in 1825 (1825)
- Sermons to Young Men (1838)
- Lectures on the Progress of Civilization and Government, and Other Subjects (1851)
- Causes and Remedies of the Present Convulsions: A Discourse (1854)
- Occasional Poems (1869)
- Memoirs and Papers of Reverend Doctor John Chase Lord
- Memoir of John C. Lord, D.D. : pastor of the Central Presbyterian Church for thirty-eight years (1878)

=== Sermons ===
- "The Character and Influence of Washington, Before the Union Continentals, of Buffalo" (22 February 1863)
- "Connection of Sacred and Profane History"
- "Descendants of Ishmael"
- "Errors in Theory, Practice, and Doctrine"
- "The Higher Law as applicable to the Fugitive Slave Bill" (30 November 1850)
- "The Justice of Our National Cause" (26 September 1861)
- "The Land of Ophir"
- "The Progress of Civilization"
- "The Romance of History"
- "Signs of the Times" (26 November 1837)
- "The Star Aldebaran" (14 February 1848)
- "The Throne of Iniquity" (26 November 1863)
- "The War of the Titans"

== See also ==
- Chase family
