= Labour movement in Lebanon =

The Lebanese labour movement dates back to the early 20th century, where in the early stages of Lebanon's conception workers started to organise to demand better protection and higher wages. For a large part of its history, the labour movement remained outside of the sectarian political system of Lebanon, being one of the larger movements through which Lebanese workers could unify along non-sectarian lines. Through the Civil War and political intervention, the labour movement has been partially integrated in the sectarian system of the country and remains fragmented today.

== History of the labour movement in Lebanon ==
=== Ottoman period (19th and beginning of 20th century) ===
At the end of the 19th century, in 1887, the Ottoman authorities made Mount Lebanon a separate province of the empire named the Mount Lebanon Mutasarrifate. With Beirut as its capital Lebanon witnessed rapid urbanisation and increasing European interest. The lack of artisan guilds and unions helped push the Lebanese economy towards the service sector and international trade, laying the foundation for Lebanon's laissez-faire economic model.

The first organised workers in Lebanon united in the Association of Printing Press Workers in 1911. The organisations that were established during the first two decades of the 20th century, like the Association of Railway Workers, organised several strikes. These strikes had limited success, due to lack of organisation. In 1913, the Committee of Union and Progress organised a general strike demanding greater autonomy from the Ottoman authorities, but the strike was heavily repressed. The People's Party was established in 1924, which one year later would become the Lebanese Communist Party. The LCP remained close to the labour movement well into the 1980's.

=== Mandate era (1922–1943) ===
Lebanon became a mandate of France in 1922. From this moment on there was an increase in print shops in Beirut, which helped the labour movement grow. In the 1930's labour movement activities were promoted through al-Yaqaza magazine, calling itself the 'voice of the working class'. The 1930's were a period of deteriorating living conditions and inflation. The 1930's were also a transformative period for the Lebanese economy, paired with social unrest due to the privileging of the (pro-)French bourgeoisie. In 1931, for example, a general strike of taxi drivers and inhabitants in Beirut and Tripoli against a French Tramway company was organised because of competition and high electricity use. The movement won after a few months.

1936 and 1937 saw an increase in demonstrations and strikes, as well as the occupation of several factories in October 1936. In 1939 the labour movement was struggling due to heavy repression by the French authorities. With the start of World War II came a revival of the industrial sector. This caused internal displacement of workers, making it harder for them to organise.

=== Post-mandate (1943–1975) ===
The first trade union federation that was established in Lebanon after the French mandate ended was the Federation of Trade Unions of Workers and Employees (FTUWE) in 1944, which was left leaning but was in its early phase considered more moderate. In the first years after its establishment, the FTUWE focused on the promulgation of a Lebanese Labour Code. After putting pressure on the government by organising a general strike, the first Labour Code was issued September 23, 1946. By doing this, the Lebanese state officially recognised trade unions for the first time. But the Labour Code also made it harder for trade unions to organise politically and for new trade unions to be established. After the Labour Code was promulgated, the Lebanese government dissolved existing unions, and authorised only unions affiliated to the government. This didn't mean organisations like the FTUWE didn't exist anymore, but they remained illegal for decades.

During the 1950's and 60's, several federations affiliated to the government were authorised, like the Federation of United Trade Unions in 1952 and, most notably, the General Confederation of Workers in Lebanon (GCWL) in 1958. This period also saw increased mobilisation from left-wing federations that were left out of the GCWL, demanding amendments to the Labour Code. At the same time, authorised unions organised themselves under the Group of Unions, and in several meetings discussed the worsening working conditions and the need for an amendment to the Labour Code. In the pre-war period, workers from the industrial and agricultural sector were well organised and conducted many strikes. Between 1954 and 1977, the labour movement organised 95 strikes, of which 38 can be considered successful. Two of the biggest strikes were the revolt of the peasants in Akkar in 1968, and the revolt against tobacco company Régie in 1973, where the army killed two protestors.

The 1960's saw some government projects on improving workers conditions under the presidency of Fouad Chehab, such as the establishment of the National Social Security Fund (NSSF) on which many Lebanese still rely today. Unfortunately, the NSSF has proved insufficient since its establishment, and in many cases isn't able to deliver. In 1970, the remaining federations outside the GCWL became a part of it, and the GCWL has remained the main representative of trade unions ever since. The number of trade unions also increased in this period, from 72 in 1956 to 117 in 1966.

=== Civil War era (1975–1991) ===
With the start of the Lebanese Civil War from 1975 to 1991 also came a stagnation in wages, high inflation, and decreasing working conditions. An increase of wages – necessary because of rising inflation – remained the main aim for the GCWL. Other points to their list of demands were end to sectarian divisions, and achieving social protection for all workers. During the war, the labour movement experienced internal conflict due to difference in political standpoints, and restrictions following militia rule. The movement also had to deal with increasing militia involvement. Still the labour movement was important in the fight against sectarian violence during the war.

One of the events that preceded and contributed to the eruption of the war was related to the labour movement: The fishermen's protest in Saida in 1975, opposing the granting of fishing rights to only one company, ended in a clash when the army intervened. Eighteen civilians were killed. During the war, the movement organised over 114 protests between 1984 and 1989. One of these actions was the general national strike in 1986, calling for an end to hunger and poverty, as well as opposing the sectarian divisions. The GCWL backed out right before the start.

=== Post-war till present ===
After the war, the Lebanese state got into a lot of debt to reconstruct the country. The consequences of this were high interest and borrowing rates, which became increasingly hard to pay for by the private sector. And although GDP also rose rapidly, this wealth wasn't distributed equally to Lebanon's citizens. Due to the predominance of workers being employed in small businesses, the number of unionised workers remained low.

The GCWL was one of the major forces behind the resignation of Prime Minister Omar Karami, as major strikes paralyzed the country. In 1994 and 1995 other general strikes were conducted, and the government put a ban on demonstrations. As a consequence, security forces acted violently towards protestors. Army intervention in labour movement actions became a regular occurrence after this.

Prime minister Rafiq Hariri's several cabinet's all had conflicts with the GCWL, and 1990's saw an increase in strikes and other actions by the labour movement. State intervention in the labour movement became more common during this time, as the government was meddling in GCWL elections. During the GCWL elections of 1997, prime minister Rafiq Hariri's cabinet successfully ousted the president of the GCWL Elias Abu Rizq. At the same time, the Ministry of Labour increasingly authorised trade unions which were first rejected by the GCWL. According to scholar Lea Bou Khater, these confrontations between the government and the GCWL in this period have less to do with labour relations, and can be seen more as a power struggle within the liberal-sectarian political system of Lebanon.

Due to an increase in trade unions, a decline in unionised workers, and political infiltration, the labour movement became fragmented from the 2000s onward. When Abu Rizq war reelected in 1998, he attempted to unify the GCWL again, but due to the internal divisions wasn't able to succeed. After 2001, state involvement was so apparent that the Lebanese government was practically in control of the GCWL. The organisation was then structured along sectarian lines.

Even though the labour movement became fragmented after the war, strikes and demonstrations were being organised. In the 2000s some demonstrations and strikes were organised, but many ended in violent intervention by the army. In 2006, a big demonstration was organised to protest against hiring on contractual basis, which barred workers from social protection. Over 200,000 people participated in the protest. Between 2011 and 2015 teachers unified to demand higher wages. In 2012, workers at Electricité du Liban went on strike for 94 days to protest against possible lay-offs.

== Labour Code and the labour movement ==
Until the Labour Code was established in the 1940's, labour related issues fel under the Ottoman Law of Associations from 1909. This legislation was not sufficient to regulate labour relations because it was too broad. The first draft law was created in 1944, to which the FTUWE proposed several amendments. The Labour Code was issued on September 23, 1946. Although this was considered as a success for the labour movement, the Labour Code still contained articles that disadvantaged workers in Lebanon.

The Labour Code consists of 114 articles, of which Article 50 was considered most problematic for the labour movement. Article 50 stated that an employer could fire any employee that didn't have a contract or agreement for a specific period or time. Other articles in the Labour Code that posed problems for the movement mostly contained basis for authorised state intervention. After decades of calling for an amendment to Article 50, the law was changed in 1974. Still, the revised version of the Labour Code only protected workers that were part of unions authorised by the Ministry of Labour.
