= Mercy Hospital of Buffalo =

Coordinates: 42°50′52″N 78°48′47″W

- Catholic Health
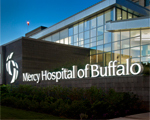
- An image of the exterior as seen from Abbott Rd. (2016)

Geography
- Location: Buffalo, New York, United States

Helipads
- Helipad: Yes

History
- Founded: 1904

Links
- Website: https://www.chsbuffalo.org/mercy-hospital-of-buffalo/
- Lists: Hospitals in New York State

Mercy Hospital of Buffalo is an acute care hospital in South Buffalo, Buffalo New York. It is managed by and the flagship facility for Catholic Health.

== History ==
In 1904, Mercy Hospital was born, when the Sister's of Mercy and Bishop Timon founded a 30-bed hospital on Tifft Street to serve South Buffalo, which ended up taking care of South Buffalo for decades.

In 2021, Mercy Hospital went through a labor strike because of difficulty finding employees, being low paid, getting beaten up in the Emergency Department, and more.

Currently, Mercy Hospital offers labor and delivery, an upgraded CT scan/imaging department., surgery, and more.

== Relations with other hospitals ==
Mercy Hospital of Buffalo is the tertiary care hospital in South Buffalo, not to be mistaken with Kenmore Mercy Hospital which is the acute care hospital in Kenmore, New York. Mercy Hospital of Buffalo is a part of Catholic Health, making it associated with hospitals like Sisters of Charity Hospital (Buffalo), and Mount Saint Mary's Hospital. Mercy Hospital of Buffalo holds a helipad, making it a main hub for Mercy Flight helicopter services. Mercy Flight issues transfer flights for ill patients from scenes to hospitals like Mercy, and transfer flights from Mercy to and from hospitals around the Western New York, and Southern Tier regions.
