= Chase family =

American family of English ancestry

- Current region: New England, New York, Midwestern United States, California, New Zealand, France
- Origin: Massachusetts and New Hampshire, originally England
- Traditions: Congregational churches, Episcopal Church, Presbyterianism

The Chase family is an English family whose members included early American pioneers and those involved in politics, the clergy, business and the military. Originating in Chesham, England, brothers Aquila Chase II and Thomas Chase journeyed to New England. In June, 1640 the brothers received land grants in Hampton, now a part of the State of New Hampshire. Most of the notable members of the family were descendants of Aquila Chase, whose children settled in Massachusetts and New Hampshire. In the late 1700s and early 1800s, members of the Chase family, who had previously been wealthy but not particularly influential, began involving themselves in law, politics, and religion. Lawyers such as Scott Lord (whose mother was a Chase) and Salmon Portland Chase, Chief Justice of the United States, were produced. Chase politicians included Dudley Chase, Champion S. Chase, Dudley Chase Denison, and Margaret Chase Smith. Though the Chase politicians were perhaps best known, the family produced several notable clergymen as well, including Episcopal bishops and educators Carlton Chase, Philander Chase and the Presbyterian theologian John Chase Lord, who were at the forefronts of their respective churches in their prime.

== Notable members and descendants ==
- Amos Chase (1718–1818) was the first deacon of the first Congregational Church and one of the founders of Saco, Maine. He was descended from Aquila Chase II.
- Champion S. Chase, first Attorney General of Nebraska. He was descended from Aquila Chase II.
- Dudley Chase, U.S. Senator, Chief Justice of Vermont. He was descended from Aquila Chase II.
- J. Richard Chase, was the sixth president of Biola University in California from 1970 to 1982 and the sixth president of Wheaton College in Illinois from 1982 to 1993.
- Gen. Jonathan Chase (colonel), was a soldier in the American Revolutionary War. He was descended from Aquila Chase II.
- Kate Chase, daughter of Salmon P. Chase. well known Washington society hostess during the American Civil War. She was descended from Aquila Chase II.
- Levi R. Chase was an American fighter pilot and double flying ace during World War II. He was descended from Aquila Chase II, of Newbury, Massachusetts.

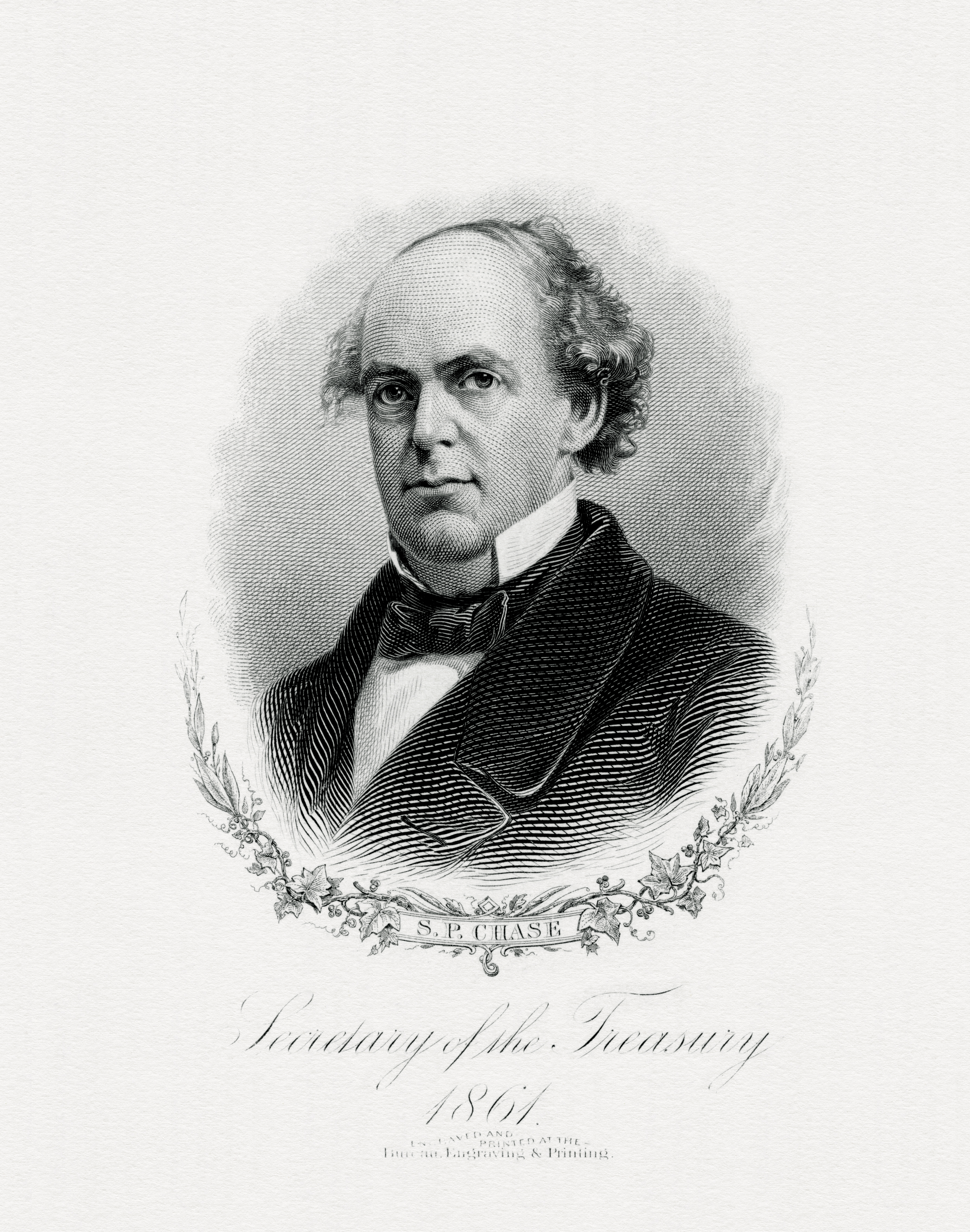
Salmon P. Chase

- Margaret Chase Smith, U.S. Senator from Maine, was descended from Aquila Chase II, of Newbury, Massachusetts.
- Bishop Carlton Chase, the first Episcopal Bishop of New Hampshire. He was descended from Aquila Chase II.
- Bishop Philander Chase, of Jubilee College, Illinois (14 December 1775), Episcopal bishop and founder of Kenyon College. He was descended from Aquila Chase II.
- Reuben Chase was an officer in the Continental Navy and served during John Paul Jones' raid into British waters. Reuben Chase was descended from Thomas Chase, of Hampton, New Hampshire.
- Salmon P. Chase, Sixth Chief Justice of the United States He was descended from Aquila Chase II.
- Thornton Chase, was a distinguished officer of the United States Colored Troops during the American Civil War, and the first western convert to the Bahá'í Faith. He was descended from Aquila Chase II, of Newbury, Massachusetts.
- Warren Chase was an American pioneer, reformer, and politician. He was descended from Aquila Chase II, of Newbury, Massachusetts.
- Stuart Chase was an American economist, social theorist, and writer. He was descended from Aquila Chase II, of Newbury, Massachusetts.
- Will Chase is an American actor, singer, and director. He is descended from Aquila Chase.
- Captain Chris Chase is a highly decorated USCG pilot receiving air medal during hurricane Katerina
