= Ursula Mattingly =

Roman Catholic religious sister and nurse

Sister Ursula Mattingly, SC
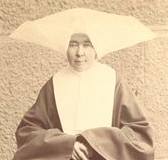
- Born: Honora Mattingly; 23 October 1808; Maryland, United States
- Died: 1874 (age 66)
- Occupations: Nurse, hospital administrator
- Organization: Daughters of Charity of Saint Vincent de Paul

Sister Ursula Mattingly, SC (23 October 1808 – 1874) was a Roman Catholic religious sister, nurse, and hospital administrator. A member of the Daughters of Charity of Saint Vincent de Paul, she is best remembered for her role as foundress of Sisters of Charity Hospital in Buffalo, New York. She has been called "one of the most successful and experienced hospital nurses in the country" and "one of God's trouble shooters".

== Biography ==
=== Early life and career ===
Honora Mattingly was born in Maryland on 23 October 1808. She entered the Sisters of Charity of St. Joseph (now known as the Daughters of Charity of Saint Vincent de Paul) on 10 October 1830. When she was clothed with the habit, she took the religious name Ursula. Her early assignments included the Baltimore Infirmary, the Philadelphia Almshouse, the Maryland Hospital for the Insane, and multiple orphanages. She served in Philadelphia during the cholera epidemic of 1832, and then at the orphan asylum at St. James in Brooklyn, after which she returned to Emmitsburg in 1846.

=== Founding Sisters of Charity Hospital ===
In 1847, John Timon, CM, the first Bishop of the Diocese of Buffalo saw the lack of an organized healthcare system in the City of Buffalo, and the additional issue of a Protestant-dominated medical field. He traveled to Baltimore in March 1848, seeking a religious order to administer the new hospital, and decided on the Sisters of Charity, based in Emmitsburg, Maryland, because they were founded by St. Elizabeth Ann Seton, the first American saint, and because they had much prior experience working with Protestants.

On 3 June 1848, Sister Ursula and eight other sisters, Sisters Ann de Sales Farren, Hieronimo O'Brien, Anacaria Hoey, Clare McDurby, Mary Aloysia Lilly, Mary Eliza Dougherty, and Agatha O'Keefe, arrived in Buffalo. The Sisters moved into an unused brick schoolhouse and adjoining cottage that had been donated by Bishop Timon, which they outfitted with 100 beds and living quarters for themselves. On 1 October 1848, Sisters of Charity Hospital officially opened as Buffalo's first large healthcare facility, under the leadership of Sister Ursula.

Their first patients were five sailors from the harbor who had cholera. Sister Ursula's willingness to take a chance on new therapies resulted in an astounding recovery of 80 of the 134 cholera patients admitted to the small center.

=== Protestant dissent ===
Very little attention at first was given to the hospital originally, with The Buffalo Morning Express reporting the news simply by writing: "The city is well received in having a hospital for its own." But, issues arose, and the presence of the nuns was especially inflammatory among the Protestant populace. In a 2009 New York History Review article titled, "John Timon — Buffalo's First Bishop: His Forgotten Struggle to Assimilate Catholics in Western New York," Paul E. Lubienecki wrote:

In antebellum America religious communities of women often absorbed the brunt of anti-Catholic prejudice. Religious orders of women, who lived and worked in a peculiar all female community, created and maintained schools, orphanages and hospitals. They also wore strange and distinctive clothing and became the object of Protestant derision. American sisters had to cope with gender, religious and ethnic bigotry while working in a patriarchal society that limited any power they might have. Rumors of evil practices and women held in convents against their will were circulated. Protestant ministers preached from their pulpit against Catholics and particularly against nuns. Sisters were often insulted or pelted in the street. Protestants, especially males, may have felt more threatened by the nuns as they perceived them to be in the process of "feminizing" the Catholic Church and usurping power. Historically, caring for the sick was perceived to be a "religious calling" not a profession. As Catholic women's religious orders began healthcare work in antebellum America, the role of women in nursing and hospital administration was gaining recognition as a profession and women were becoming empowered to take on non-traditional roles.

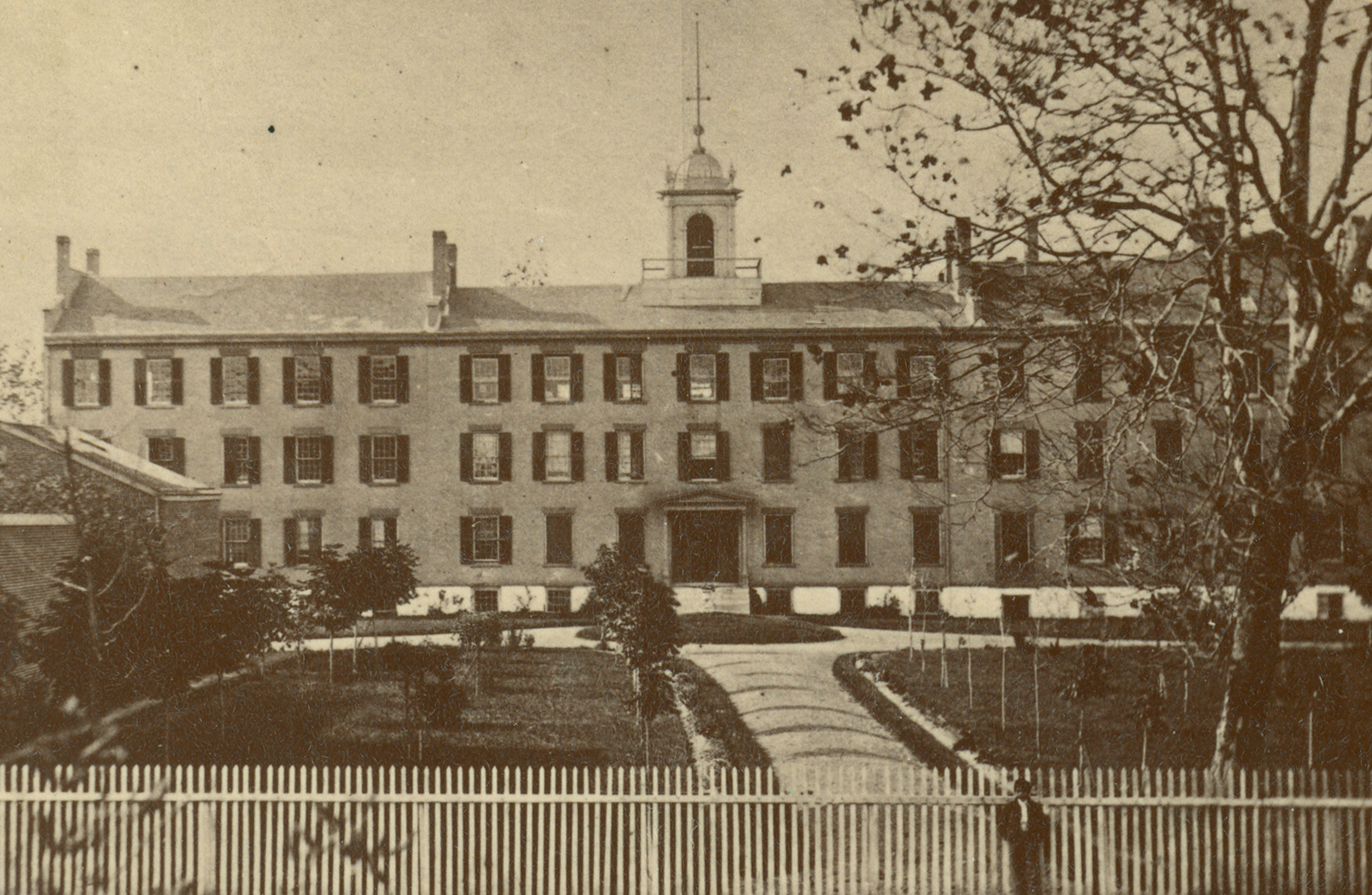
Sisters of Charity Hospital in 1870.

Buffalo's Protestant elite began speaking out against the Sisters Hospital and its state funding, criticizing its all-female leadership, lack of physicians' influence in decision making, and small staff. In early February 1850, Protestant doctors Josiah Trowbridge, Austin Flint, and James White privately complained to influential local Presbyterian minister, Reverend John C. Lord, DD, a firm nativist and anti-Catholic, about the administration of the hospital, arguing that three Sisters alone was not proper for the management of an entire hospital. He was enraged, seeing it not only as a religious threat but a political concern.

=== Letter-writing feud ===
On 16 February 1850, the Saturday edition of The Buffalo Morning Express published an anonymous letter to the editor condemning the state legislature for providing public funding for Sisters of Charity Hospital "without securing the rights of the public therein or requiring any of the usual guarantees of the appropriation of that money. Much dissatisfaction has been felt and expressed in regard to the actions of the legislature." The letter was written by Reverend Lord under his admitted pseudonym "Constituents". The inflammatory message resulted in a series of letters from both the Diocese of Buffalo and "Constituents", all published by The Buffalo Morning Express, a Whig Party-dominated and strongly anti-Catholic publication.

In yet another letter, Reverend Lord wrote falsehoods about the Sisters and the hospital: "... had not the migrating body of sisters abandoned their location in another state ... May not the hospital here be closed at any time by the departure of its inmates to a new locality?" He also accused the Sisters of providing Catholic priests for patients who requested Protestant ministers and of offering patients free treatment if they converted to Catholicism. In reality, Bishop Timon, carefully recognizing the risk of proselytizing in such a hostile area, specifically forbad the Sisters of Charity from ever mentioning religion to Protestants unless one initiated the topic independently. Lord then published the statements of two former patients, who testified that Sister Ursula improperly treated non-Catholic patients, was not "properly trained in the medicines," and was a foreigner. One, named Michael Murphy, swore out an affidavit on 1 March 1850. He reported that Reverend Lord offered him clothes and enough money to travel to Canada, where he was relocating, if he would tell the "emigrant agent office" that he was treated poorly by the Sisters of Charity.

=== Expansion ===
Sister Ursula spent much of her time as director of the hospital overseeing its large expansion. In 1852 and again in 1853, the State of New York gave $7,000 to Sisters of Charity Hospital (equivalent to $414,815 in 2015 dollars) for the hospital expansion and construction of an orphanage. The funding was independent of any State Legislature decision, and was provided in exchange for the hospital providing care for impoverished foreigners. For this service, the hospital also received annual per capita payments from 1851 to 1860 from the State Commissioners of Immigration.

In 1854, using the state funding, the Daughters of Charity began expanding in Buffalo, founding St. Mary's Infant Asylum and Maternity Hospital at Elmwood and Edward Streets. It served nearly entirely orphans and unwed mothers, leaving the main hospital more space for the average ill person. It closed in 1951.

=== Later life ===
Sister Ursula was reassigned from Sisters of Charity Hospital in 1855, after seven years at its helm. By August 1859, she was the Sister Servant in charge of St. Joseph's Hospital in Philadelphia. She died on April 6, 1874, at the age of 66 in Baltimore.

== See also ==
- Catholic sisters and nuns in the United States
