= Sisters of Charity Hospital (Buffalo) =

Coordinates: 42.9290°N 78.8502°W

- Catholic Health
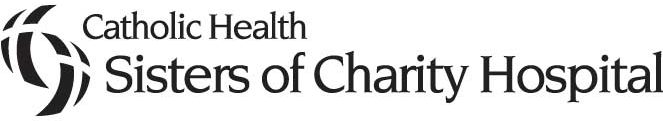

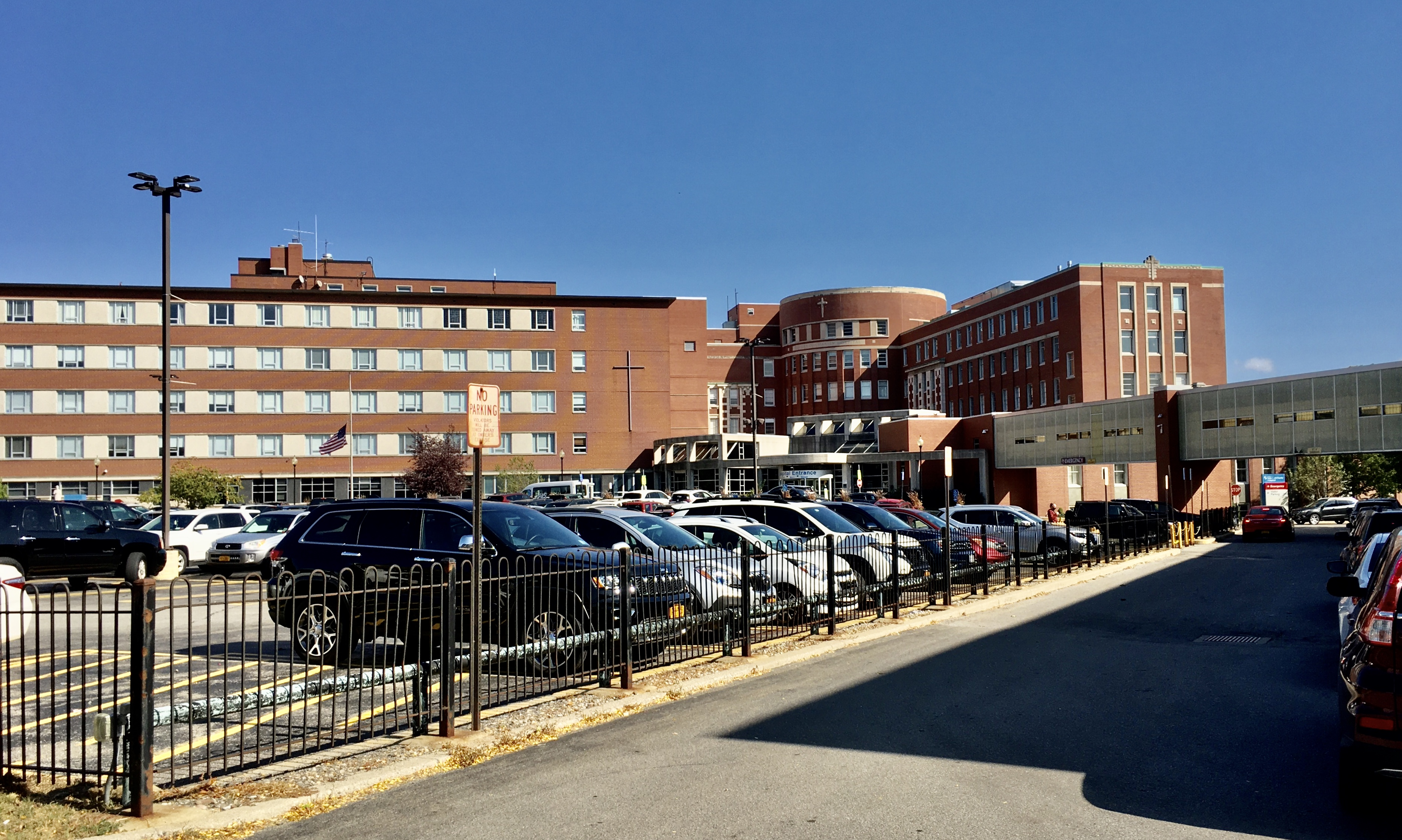
- Sisters of Charity Hospital as seen in September 2020

Geography
- Location: 2157 Main Street, Buffalo, New York, United States

Organization
- Type: Teaching
- Affiliated university: New York Institute of Technology College of Osteopathic Medicine

Services
- Emergency department: Yes
- Beds: 310

History
- Founded: 1 October 1848

Links
- Lists: Hospitals in New York State

Sisters of Charity Hospital is a general medical and surgical hospital founded in 1848 by the Daughters of Charity of St. Vincent de Paul, and the oldest hospital in Buffalo, New York. Part of Catholic Health, it is also a teaching hospital affiliated with the New York Institute of Technology College of Osteopathic Medicine as a clinical campus of the medical school to provide clinical clerkship education to osteopathic medical students. The hospital has 310 beds and specializes in women's health services.

== History ==
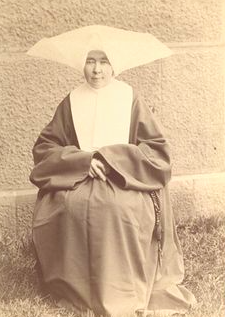
Sister Ursula Mattingly, DC, first administrator of the hospital.

=== Founding ===
The Roman Catholic Diocese of Buffalo was created in 1847, and Bishop John Timon, CM, its first prelate, immediately saw the lack of an organized healthcare system in the City of Buffalo. There were some private clinics, but no large central hospital, public or private. The city's mainly Protestant and nativist leadership did not adequately address the healthcare needs of the rapidly growing and mostly Catholic working class, partly due to prejudice. Some did try to establish a Protestant hospital, but efforts faded away for lack of popular interest. Bishop Timon took efforts into his own hands as he saw the pressing need of Buffalo's Catholics for proper healthcare. He traveled to Baltimore in March 1848, seeking a religious order to administer the new hospital. He especially wanted the Sisters of Charity (now known as the Daughters of Charity), who were based in Emmitsburg, Maryland, because they were founded by St. Elizabeth Ann Seton, the first American saint, and because they had much prior experience working with Protestants. He believed these qualifications made them the ideal religious congregation to work in such a hostile anti-Catholic atmosphere as Buffalo was at the time.

On 3 June 1848, eight Sisters of Charity, Sisters Ursula Mattingly, Ann de Sales Farren, Hieronimo O'Brien, Anacaria Hoey, Clare McDurby, Mary Aloysia Lilly, Mary Eliza Dougherty, and Agatha O'Keefe, arrived in Buffalo. Bishop Timon had purchased an unused brick schoolhouse and adjoining cottage at Pearl Place, which he gave to the Sisters to use. They outfitted it with 100 beds and living quarters for themselves. On 1 October 1848, Sisters of Charity Hospital officially opened as Buffalo's first large healthcare facility, under the leadership of Sister Ursula Mattingly, DC. The first patients were a group of six sailors.

=== Protestant dissent ===
Very little attention at first was given to the hospital originally, with The Buffalo Morning Express reporting the news simply by writing: "The city is well received in having a hospital for its own." The New York State Legislature provided funding for sectarian hospitals in locations where there were no nonsectarian hospitals. Sisters of Charity Hospital was eligible and received $9,000 (equivalent to $359,617 in 2024 dollars). The state funding was done rather inconspicuously, and the news only gained attention a few months later, when some of Buffalo's Protestant doctors protested the state funding of a Catholic institution as the city's first hospital. Especially inflammatory was the presence of Catholic nuns. In a 2009 New York History Review article titled, "John Timon — Buffalo’s First Bishop: His Forgotten Struggle to Assimilate Catholics in Western New York," Paul E. Lubienecki wrote:

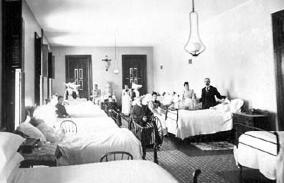
An inpatient room at the original hospital

"In antebellum America religious communities of women often absorbed the brunt of anti-Catholic prejudice. Religious orders of women, who lived and worked in a peculiar all female community, created and maintained schools, orphanages and hospitals. They also wore strange and distinctive clothing and became the object of Protestant derision. American sisters had to cope with gender, religious and ethnic bigotry while working in a patriarchal society that limited any power they might have. Rumors of evil practices and women held in convents against their will were circulated. Protestant ministers preached from their pulpit against Catholics and particularly against nuns. Sisters were often insulted or pelted in the street. Protestants, especially males, may have felt more threatened by the nuns as they perceived them to be in the process of "feminizing" the Catholic Church and usurping power. Historically, caring for the sick was perceived to be a "religious calling" not a profession. As Catholic women’s religious orders began healthcare work in antebellum America, the role of women in nursing and hospital administration was gaining recognition as a profession and women were becoming empowered to take on non-traditional roles."

Tensions were high in New York at this time due to the recent Seneca Falls Convention, at which 68 women and 32 men out of 300 attendees signed the now-famous Declaration of Sentiments, which listed men's abuses of women's freedom and rights. Lubienecki wrote that the event was still fresh in the minds of the people of New York, and that the Protestant men of Buffalo felt threatened, increasing their strong objection to the educated, Catholic females who were running a now-state funded hospital. Buffalo's elite began speaking out against the Sisters Hospital and its state funding, criticizing its all-female leadership, lack of physicians' influence in decision making, and small staff. In early February 1850, Protestant doctors Josiah Trowbridge, Austin Flint, and James White privately complained to influential local Presbyterian minister, Reverend John C. Lord, DD, a firm nativist and anti-Catholic, about the administration of the hospital, arguing that three Sisters alone was not proper for the management of an entire hospital. He was enraged, seeing it not only as a religious threat but a political concern.

=== Letter-writing feud ===
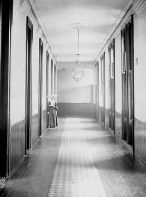
A hospital hallway

On 16 February 1850, the Saturday edition of The Buffalo Morning Express published an anonymous letter to the editor condemning the state legislature for providing public funding for Sisters of Charity Hospital "without securing the rights of the public therein or requiring any of the usual guarantees of the appropriation of that money. Much dissatisfaction has been felt and expressed in regard to the actions of the legislature." The letter was written by Reverend Lord under his admitted pseudonym "Constituents". The inflammatory message resulted in a series of letters from both the Diocese of Buffalo and "Constituents", all published by The Buffalo Morning Express, a Whig Party-dominated and strongly anti-Catholic publication. Bishop Timon expressed dismay when shown the letter, and two days later The Buffalo Morning Express published a reply letter, in which he wrote that the Sisters of Charity Hospital was an "institution resting on the broad lines of charity, without reference to creed, color or country." Reverend Lord wrote a heated letter in reply, calling the idea of the hospital as charitable "ridiculous". He contended that the hospital funding was granted to win political favor, as it was granted just prior to an election. Bishop Timon responded with a letter implying that bigotry towards the charity of the Catholic Church is the reason for the letters written by "Constituents." Bishop Timon then tasked Vicar General Fr. Bernard O'Reilly with the letter-writing feud while he focused on acquiring further state funds to expand the hospital and build an orphanage and school for the deaf.

Reverend Lord, through his pseudonym, responded in his own defense, stating that "Roman Catholic institutions, charitable if they please to call them so" are not what is opposed by Protestants, only the fact that the state legislature is "[funding] not a public hospital but a Roman Catholic one," and were "willing to do for the Papists what they have never done for their own religious institutions." He accused the government of being in collaboration with the Catholic Church, arguing that the funding was illegal. He warned that Sisters of Charity Hospital would make "citizens become subjects of Romish magic," and asked "are Roman Catholics to be almoners of Protestant charities to the poor and destitute?" In another letter, he asserted that the hospital funding was illegal because "not a single Protestant is in the Corporation or has any supervision of its affairs." In the Christian Advocate, a Protestant newspaper at which Reverend Lord was editor, he questioned why anyone who defends the Constitution "will be willing to be taxed to build up an institution the control of which is beyond the votes of a free republican people." Vicar General Fr. O'Reilly responded with a letter the next day reminding that the hospital existed to provide "corporeal mercy" for the sick and injured and that "the doors of that institution are as free to the clergy of one denomination of believers as they are to that of another."

In yet another letter, Reverend Lord wrote falsehoods about the Sisters and the hospital: "…had not the migrating body of sisters abandoned their location in another state… May not the hospital here be closed at any time by the departure of its inmates to a new locality?" He also accused the Sisters of providing Catholic priests for patients who requested Protestant ministers and of offering patients free treatment if they converted to Catholicism. In reality, Bishop Timon, carefully recognizing the risk of proselytizing in such a hostile area, specifically forbad the Sisters of Charity from ever mentioning religion to Protestants unless one initiated the topic independently. Lord then published the statements of two former patients, who testified that Sister Ursula Mattingly, the director of the hospital, improperly treated non-Catholic patients, was not "properly trained in the medicines," and was a foreigner. One, named Michael Murphy, swore out an affidavit on 1 March 1850. He reported that Reverend Lord offered him clothes and enough money to travel to Canada, where he was relocating, if he would tell the "emigrant agent office" that he was treated poorly by the Sisters of Charity.

While Bishop Timon's and "Constituents," or Reverend Lord's letters were prolific during the month of February, by March Buffalo had a more pressing concern: a cholera epidemic was reaching its height after several months. Bishop Timon abruptly ceased responding to Reverend Lord's public letters; he was too busy with his efforts procuring additional state funding to expand the hospital. Also on his mind was the longterm missions of literally building a diocese from the ground up. New parishes, schools, colleges, seminaries, and an orphanage were needed to serve the growing Catholic population, who now made up more than half the population of Buffalo. Reverend Lord published one last attack in The Buffalo Morning Express on 2 March 1850, warning local Protestants that Catholic priests and nuns seek "the conversion of Protestant children to the Romish faith." He warned, "beware of the Romish priesthood," claiming they ignore their vows of celibacy and use the Catholic Church for profit.

In 1850, after months of public feuding between the Catholic and Protestant leaders of Buffalo, the New York State Legislature passed multiple bills denying additional funding to Sisters of Charity Hospital. The laws were pushed through by State Assemblyman John Putnam, a close friend of Reverend Lord, who wrote of the events in his memoir, "the apostate and tyranny of Rome was discovered and the State wisely chose to listen to the people for there is a law greater than the Constitution."

In 1851, the esteemed Buffalo Medical Journal published an assessment of Sisters of Charity Hospital's performance during the 1849–1850 cholera epidemic, giving the Daughters of Charity (the Sisters of Charity changed their name in 1850) overwhelming praise, stating that:

"each patient admitted to the Hospital was at once placed under the charge of one of the Sisters and received her unceasing care. The degree of patience and endurance exhibited by the Sisters of charity in their unwearied labors of mercy was a matter of astonishment not less than of admiration."

The report also praised the hospital in its continuation "that whatever credit is due to the Institution for the large proportion of recoveries belongs to those under whose immediate charge the Institution is placed."

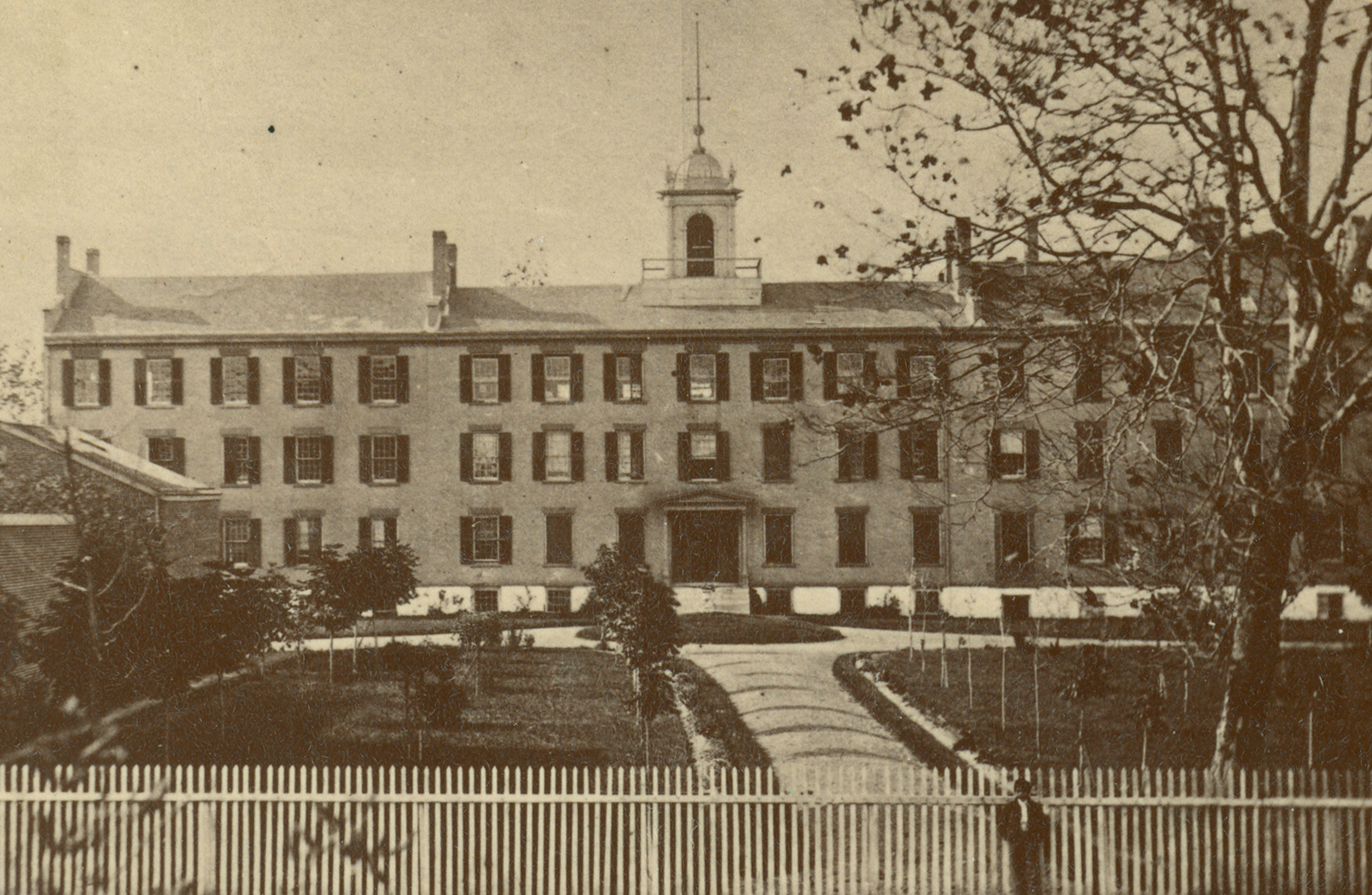
Sisters of Charity Hospital in 1870.

=== Expansion ===
In 1852 and again in 1853, the State gave $7,000 to Sisters of Charity Hospital (equivalent to $414,815 in 2015 dollars) for the hospital expansion and construction of an orphanage. The funding was independent of any State Legislature decision, and was provided in exchange for the hospital providing care for impoverished foreigners. For this service, the hospital also received annual per capita payments from 1851 to 1860 from the State Commissioners of Immigration.

Meanwhile, things were looking up both politically and socially for the hospital and its public image. The famously anti-Catholic and nativist Whig Party was largely declining in Erie County, with the rise of the more tolerant Democratic and Republican Parties. Even Whig-Catholic relations were somewhat improved, with one faction of the party promising state funding for Catholic schools and institutions. Buffalo's Protestants no longer openly protested Sisters of Charity Hospital's state funding, and Bishop Timon began strengthening his ties to Protestants, to the point where he was able to construct a Catholic cathedral right near the Episcopal cathedral with no significant fanfare.

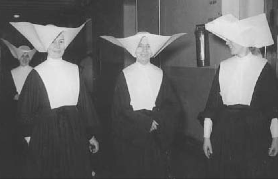
Three Daughters of Charity at the hospital during the late 1800s.

In 1854, using the state funding, the Daughters of Charity began expanding in Buffalo, founding St. Mary's Infant Asylum and Maternity Hospital at Elmwood and Edward Streets. It served nearly entirely orphans and unwed mothers, leaving the main hospital more space for the average ill person. It closed in 1951. In 1860, Bishop Timon requested the Daughters of Charity open an institution for the mentally ill. They obliged, and Providence Retreat was established that same year at the current Sisters of Charity Hospital location at Main and Humboldt Streets, a 30-acre site purchased from Dr. Austin Flint, who was the first chief of medical staff at the hospital.

Even with multiple specialty facilities, Buffalo was growing faster than the healthcare system could. It was clear that the Sisters of Charity Hospital's original location, at Pearl Place, was much too small. A new site at Main and Delvan Streets was acquired, and a new 300-bed hospital was finished in 1876. From the five-year period of 1877–1882, 4,420 patients were cared for at a total expense of $19,000, half of whom were charity cases.

By 1884, the Daughters of Charity in Buffalo ran four hospitals: Sisters of Charity hospital for the sick, St. Mary's Infant Asylum and Maternity Hospital for orphans and unwed mothers, Providence Retreat for the mentally ill and Emergency Hospital, which opened in 1884. The Diocese of Buffalo took possession of Emergency Hospital in 1954. Today it is a private institution called Sheehan Memorial Hospital. Providence Retreat closed in 1940, and two years later the Sisters Hospital opened a branch, the St. Louise de Marillac Maternity Hospital in its former building. In 1948, Sisters of Charity Hospital moved to its present location. It merged St. Louise de Marillac Hospital with its own maternity unit, and the Daughters of Charity were back to running a diverse centralized hospital as they did in their early years.

=== Recent years ===
In 2002, Sister Sue O'Neill, DC, founded Sisters Hospital's groundbreaking massage therapy program, the first of its kind in the region. It has since expanded from just her to an entire department, and has spawned similar programs and nearby hospitals. O'Neill commented on the program to The Buffalo News in 2014: "When I started, it was just myself, and it was with a lot of resistance. Now, it’s huge. It’s a whole wing of the hospital."

As years went by, Sisters of Charity Hospital has added many additions to its facilities. The first, a 1948 addition, currently houses the hospital's Emergency Department, Family Health Center, patient rooms, and outpatient treatment areas. In 1965, a five-story addition was built, and contains administrative offices, the Maternity Department, patient rooms, conference areas, the Medical Record Department and physician lounge. Another 1967 addition holds the Pharmacy, Central Supply, Diagnostic Imaging, and Purchasing Departments. In 1974, two new additions were constructed. The first, the Seton Professional Building, contains medical and commercial offices and hospital extension offices. The St. Catherine Laboure Health Center, originally called the Skilled Nursing Facility, contains rehabilitative services, social work, and 80-bed skilled nursing center. Re-Vision 2000, a modernization push by the hospital, included a 1994 renovation, 1992 two-story addition containing new intensive care and coronary care units, 1992 new information services and finance building named after Sr. Mary Charles Dever, DC, former hospital President and CEO, and in 1993, a new Surgical Department. A new entrance, lobby, Admissions Department and ambulatory care wing were also constructed as part of Re-Vision 2000.

In 2009, St. Joseph Intercommunity Hospital in Cheektowaga, New York merged with Sisters Hospital, having St. Joes becoming Sisters of Charity Hospital, St. Joseph Campus.

In early June 2013, it was announced that the Daughters of Charity would be leaving Sisters of Charity Hospital for other ministries later that month after 166 years staffing the institution. Five Daughters, Sisters Mary Grace Higgins, Claire Edwards, Ann Paul Chenard, Sue O'Neill, and Mary Anne Brawley, were living and working at the hospital at the time of the move. Sister Janet Keim, DC, Provincial Councilor for the Daughters of Charity Province of St. Louise, cited the declining and aging number of Daughters, and a desire to staff current and new missions serving the materially poor. President and CEO Peter U. Bergmann expressed surprise and sadness at the news, although he affirmed that the order would continue their sponsorship of the hospital and membership on the Catholic Health System board. Over 850 Daughters of Charity have served at Sisters of Charity Hospital since its founding, and continued to lead the hospital as Presidents until 1992, when the first layperson assumed the post. Bishop Richard Malone celebrated a Mass in commemoration of the Daughters' long service at the hospital.

== Operations ==
=== Present day ===
Survey data for the latest year available shows that 69,806 patients visited the hospital's emergency room. The hospital had a total of 18,587 admissions. Its physicians performed 6,586 inpatient and 19,720 outpatient surgeries.

== List of administrators ==
The following is an incomplete list of the administrators of Sisters of Charity Hospital. Throughout much of the hospital's history and until the mid-20th Century, the hospital's leaders went by the title of Sister Servant. Only in later years was the title President and CEO used.

Sister Servants

- Sr. Ursula (Honora) Mattingly, DC (1848–1855)
- Sr. Camilla O'Keefe, DC (1859–1860)*
- Sr. Louisa, DC (1864–1865)*
- Sr. Mary Florence, DC (1880–1897)*
- Sr. Felicite, DC (1901)*
- Sr. Mary Laura, DC (1905)*
- Sr. Mary Genevieve, DC (1909)*
- Sr. Mary Gertrude, DC (1920)*
- Sr. Angelica Howard, DC (1921–1922)*
- Sr. Vincent, DC, RN (1935)*

*Full tenure of leadership unknown

Presidents and CEOs

- Sr. Rosa (Eileen) Daly, DC (1957–1969)
- Sr. Mary Charles Dever, DC (1972–1983)
- John J Maher, (1993-1998)
- Peter U. Bergmann, FACHE (2006 – 2017)
- Martin Boryszak, (2017–Present)

== Sisters of Charity Hospital-St Joseph Campus ==
In 1960, St. Joseph Intercommunity Hospital opened in Cheektowaga, New York and accepted its first patient. In 2009, St. Joseph Intercommunity Hospital in Cheektowaga, New York merged with Sisters Hospital, causing St. Joes to become Sisters of Charity Hospital, St. Joseph Campus.. In 2020, during the COVID-19 pandemic, St Joes became the nation's first COVID-only treatment facility, even to the point of closing its Emergency Department. That forced people to have to go farther to hospitals for care. Like to Mercy Hospital of Buffalo and Erie County Medical Center. St Joseph Campus has since transferred out of that mindset, and is an outpatient and ambulatory care center for Cheektowaga, and close suburbs. St Joseph Campus now has an Emergency Department, an orthopedic care center.
