= 1991–1992 Lebanese protests =

The 1991–1992 Lebanese protests was widespread demonstrations, nationwide strikes, protest rallies, labour marches and a wave of popular and unprecedented wave of economic protests and countrywide uprising against the government of Omar Karami in Lebanon and his cabinet due to serious issues and political problems.

The protests would be the biggest since the food riots of 1987 or even further, the protests of 1952. The protests directed at better wages, better jobs and conditions, labour unions attention and the resignation of the entire government.

Demonstrators also marched in support of the Gulf War and Iraq’s invasion of Kuwait and participated in protests against the occupation of southern Lebanon by Israel and Syrian occupation of Lebanon, starting during the Lebanese Civil War and the protest actions occurred in 1991.

Bank employees, retirees and bank unions led strikes in Beirut in protest at the economic turmoil. In May 1992, a national movement and popular demonstrations erupted as part of a 4-day strike movement against the economic crisis, leading to the resignation of the government of Omar Karami and the rise of wealthy businessmen Rafic Hariri.

== See also ==
- 2019–2021 Lebanese protests
