= 2021 John Deere strike =

Nationwide labor strike in the United States

- Part of Striketober
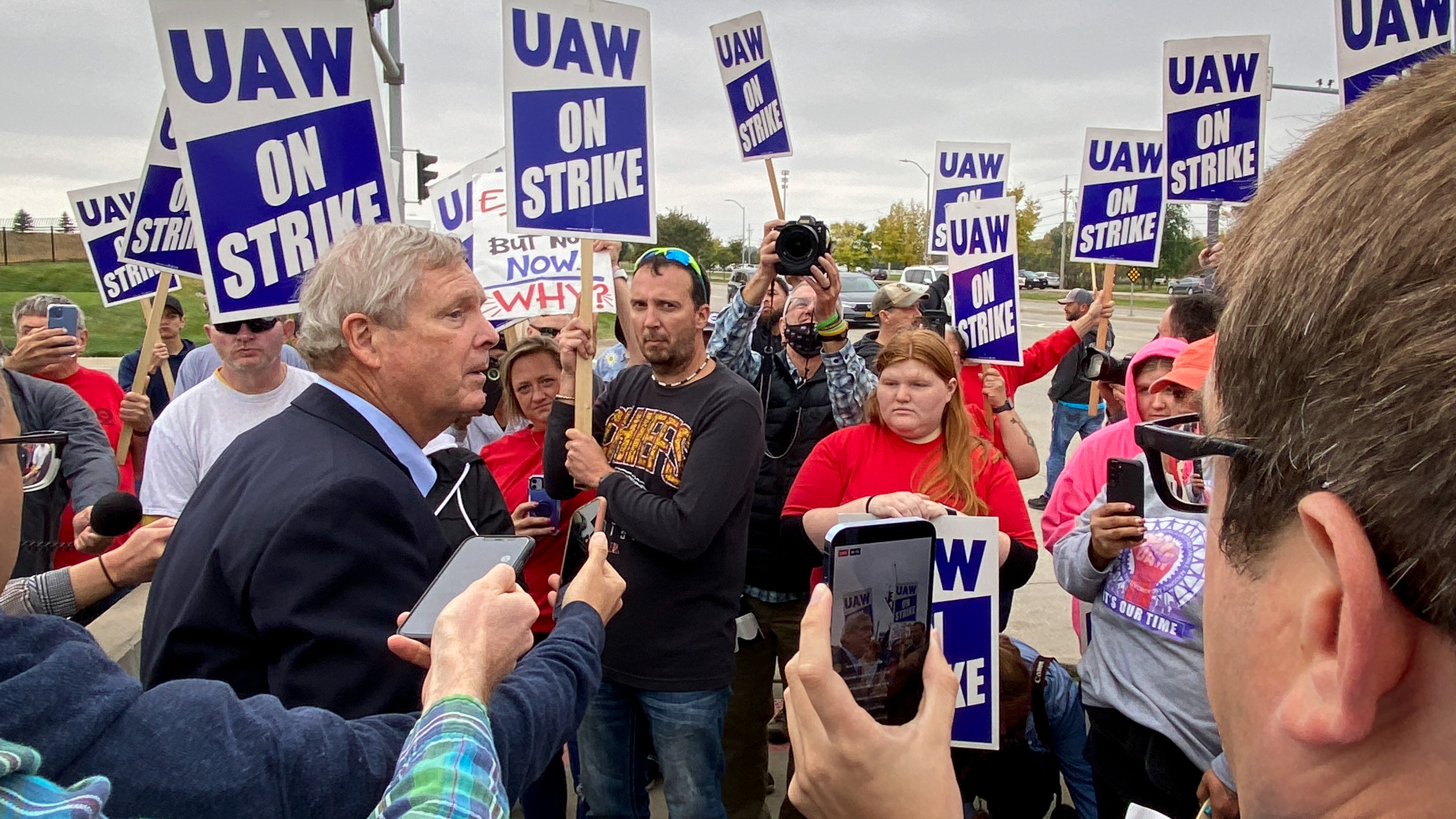
- United States Secretary of Agriculture Tom Vilsack meeting with strikers in Ankeny, Iowa, October 20
- Date: October 14 – November 17, 2021
- Location: United States: Colorado; Georgia; Illinois; Iowa; Kansas
- Caused by: Disagreements over terms of a new labor contract
- Goals: Higher wages; Pensions for new hires; Removal of the two-tier employee system
- Methods: Picketing; Strike action

Parties
United Auto Workers	John Deere

The 2021 John Deere strike was a labor strike in the United States that began on October 14 and ended on November 17, and involved about 10,000 employees for John Deere, a manufacturer of agricultural and heavy machinery. These employees are members of the United Auto Workers (UAW) labor union, which had been negotiating a new contract with John Deere for several months. On November 17, the workers approved a new 6-year contract officially putting an end to the strike. The strike was John Deere's first in over three decades.

== Background ==
John Deere is a United States–based agricultural and heavy machinery manufacturer. The company is the world's largest manufacturer of farm equipment and employs about 27,500 people in the United States and Canada. 10,000 of its employees at 14 different facilities in the United States (including 7,200 at seven factories in Iowa, three in Illinois, one in Kansas, and one distribution center in Colorado, Georgia, and Illinois) are represented by the United Auto Workers (UAW) labor union. Going into October 2021, the UAW had been negotiating a new labor contract with John Deere for several weeks, and the previous month, they submitted a proposal that union and company negotiators had agreed upon to the union members for a vote. However, after receiving the proposal, the UAW members voted by about 99 percent to authorize strike action against the company. Additionally, on September 14, some John Deere workers picketed the John Deere World Headquarters in Moline, Illinois in response to some of the issues they had with the company.

On October 1, the existing contract between the union and company expired, but the two sides agreed to a temporary extension while negotiations continued. Despite UAW negotiators stating that the deal would result in "the highest quality health care benefits in the industry" and "significant economic gains" for the workers, on October 10, union members voted by over 90 percent to reject the contract proposal. The proposed contract would have enacted immediate wage increases of 5 to 6 percent for all workers and subsequent 3 percent raises in both 2023 and 2025. This would have meant an hourly pay of $30 for the top-tier workers at the plants, which would rise to $31.84 after five years. Additionally, the contract maintained the workers' premium-free health care plan, included a cost of living adjustment, and guaranteed a retirement bonus of up to $50,000. However, union members stated that the proposal did not include large enough wage increases and did not meet their goals with regards to retirement benefits. Specifically, the contract would result in new hires receiving lower retirement benefits than existing employees. Instead of a pension, employees hired after November 1 would instead receive matching contributions to a 401(k) account. This two-tier system stems from a previous agreement that the union had made with the company in 1997 that saw new hires receive lower pay and benefits, and while many union members were hoping to get rid of this tier system, the new contract would have expanded it.

As a result of the proposal's rejection, the workers set a deadline of 11:59 p.m. on October 13, after which they would go on strike. Speaking about the proposal's rejection, several union members criticized the concessions that the union had made in previous contract renewals, such as in 1997 and 2015. In 2015, the contract proposal barely passed by about 200 votes following several rounds of layoffs. However, while these contracts had been negotiated during difficult times for the company, 2021 was a profitable year for John Deere, with revenue up 11 percent and net income up 84 percent compared to the previous year. For 2021, John Deere was expecting to make a record $6 billion in profit. In addition, workers expressed dissatisfaction with their work schedules during the COVID-19 pandemic, with many working 10 to 12 hours per day and on weekends. One worker, speaking to The Guardian, stated, "It goes way deeper than just not liking a contract. It's the summation of years of negative wage movement and probably would've happened last contract had the layoff situation not happened." On October 13, the day before the strike was set to commence, multiple John Deere facilities told some workers not to come to work for their shifts in preparation for the strike action. The strike was the first at John Deere since a 163-day one in 1986 and was the largest private-sector strike in the United States since a UAW-led strike at General Motors in 2019.

== Course of the strike ==
As the deadline passed with no new contract proposal, the workers went on strike on October 14, 2021. At the plant in Milan, Illinois, strikers almost immediately began picketing, and UAW President Ray Curry voiced his support for the strike, saying, "The almost one million UAW retirees and active members stand in solidarity with the striking UAW members at John Deere." For the duration of the strike, the union members received a weekly strike pay of $275 from the UAW. At the Ottumwa, Iowa, plant, picketers convinced a semi-trailer truck delivery driver to turn around, with reports of similar events at the Davenport and Dubuque, Iowa, plants. A company spokesperson said that they were looking to resolve the strike and stated, "Our immediate concern is meeting the needs of our customers, who work in time-sensitive and critical industries such as agriculture and construction". The company also stated that they would continue operations for the duration of the strike. Speaking about the strike, economist Dave Swenson of Iowa State University stated that John Deere's increased sales in 2021 could allow them to meet some of the union members' demands, saying, "They can afford to settle this thing on much more agreeable terms to the union and still maintain really strong profitability." Other economists predicted that the strike may not last long, given the high demand for agricultural equipment and a well-performing agricultural sector. Shortly after the strike began, many elected officials and candidates in the Iowa Democratic Party voiced their support for the strikers. Additionally, Kim Reynolds, Governor of Iowa, stated she hoped that John Deere and the UAW could come to an agreement soon. On October 16, KWQC-TV reported that many small businesses in the Quad Cities area (where several of the John Deere plants are located) were offering discounts, and in some cases, free food for strikers.

On October 17, the Associated Press reported that some agricultural groups and businesses associated with John Deere were concerned about the effects of a lengthy strike, with the president of the Iowa Corn Growers Association stating that a shortage of John Deere parts could significantly impact the farmers' harvests. Several days later, on October 22, ABC News reported that a GoFundMe campaign organized to help the strikers had accumulated more than $80,000 in donations from over 2,000 donors over a four-day period. On the morning of October 27, a striking worker who was reporting to the picket line outside the Milan plant was killed in a traffic accident outside the facility. Following the incident, Curry stated that the striker had "made the ultimate sacrifice in reporting to picket for a better life for his family and coworkers" and ordered the UAW flag to fly at half-staff for the day.

On November 2, strikers rejected a new contract. The vote was split with 45% in favor of the contract and 55% against.

== Outcomes and impacts ==
Strikers accepted a third proposed contract from Deere, voting 61% for to 39% against, ending the strike on November 17. The accepted deal boosted worker pay over a period of six years, with a 10% increase in the first year, followed by a 5% increase in the contract's third and fifth years. Additionally, workers will receive an $8500 signing bonus. Investment bank William Blair & Company estimated that the strike likely reduced Deere's output by 10–15% for the fourth quarter of 2021 and the first quarter of 2022.

The strike led to an increase in the already-inflated auction prices of used Deere equipment such as tractors and other used agricultural machines.

The increase in wages achieved through the strike meant an increase in the purchasing power of workers and their families and a strengthening of local economies.

== See also ==
- 1986–1987 John Deere strike
- Strikes during the COVID-19 pandemic
