= Catholic Health =

Healthcare system in New York, US

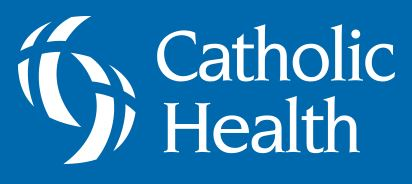
- Type: Non-profit healthcare system
- Industry: Healthcare
- Founded: 1998
- Headquarters: Buffalo, New York, US
- Area served: Western New York
- Key people: Joyce Markiewicz, President & CEO
- Products: hospitals, primary care centers, diagnostic and treatment centers, home care agencies, long-term care facilities
- Website: www.chsbuffalo.org

Catholic Health is a non-profit comprehensive healthcare system formed in 1998 under Catholic sponsors in Western New York, United States.

== Description ==
The organization provides health services through their hospitals, primary care centers, diagnostic and treatment centers, home care agencies, long-term care facilities and other programs. The system brings together more than 9,000 associates and 1,300 physicians to the Western New York market. Its Sisters of Charity Hospital in Buffalo, New York is a clinical affiliate of the New York Institute of Technology College of Osteopathic Medicine, one of the largest medical schools in the United States.

== Hospitals and facilities ==
Catholic Health currently manages over 30 facilities in the eight counties of Western New York.

=== Hospitals ===
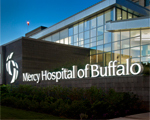

- Kenmore Mercy Hospital (Kenmore) - A 184-bed hospital opened on October 7, 1951 on a parcel of land given to the Sisters of Mercy by James Sullivan, a former student of Sr. Mary Bernadine at St. Brigid’s School in Buffalo.
- Lockport Memorial Hospital - A 10-bed inpatient hospital with a 18-bed ER that opened on October 10, 2023 after the sudden closure of Eastern Niagara Hospital in June 2023.
- Mercy Hospital of Buffalo - A 387-bed hospital, originally opened in 1904 as a 30-bed hospital by the Sisters of Mercy to serve the South Buffalo community. The original Mercy Hospital opened on Tifft Street then later moved to its current location on Abbott Road.
- Mount St. Mary's Hospital & Health Center (Lewiston) - A 175-bed hospital, originally opened in 1907 in Niagara Falls, NY by the Sisters of St. Francis of Williamsville. In 1965, a new hospital was opened on a 30-acre campus in Lewiston. The old Mount St. Mary's Hospital became St. Mary's Manor, a 104-bed nursing home in 1966 and closed in 2003. Mount St. Mary's Hospital joined Catholic Health on July 1, 2015.
- Sisters of Charity Hospital (Buffalo) - A 310-bed hospital, originally chartered as the first regional hospital in October 1848.
- Sisters of Charity Hospital, St. Joseph Campus (Cheektowaga) - A 103-bed hospital opened in 1960 by the Franciscan Sisters of St. Joseph. After being slated for closure, St. Joseph's Intercommunity Hospital merged with Sisters of Charity Hospital in 2009.

=== Other facilities ===
Some of the other facilities managed by Catholic Health include:

- Father Baker Manor - a 160-bed, residential nursing facility located in Orchard Park named after Father Nelson Baker
- McAuley Residence - a 160-bed nursing home located in Kenmore named after the foundress of the Sisters of Mercy, Catherine McAuley.
- Mercy Ambulatory Care Center - is a licensed 2 bed hospital that differs from an urgent care center because it is classified as a hospital, and therefore, can receive ambulances and patients with severe and/or life-threatening illnesses and injuries. It provides outpatient services and 24/7 emergency care services to patients in the Southtowns. It is a division of Mercy Hospital of Buffalo.
- Mercy Comprehensive Care Center - a state of the art facility in Buffalo's Old First Ward that provides an array services including primary care, pediatric care, OB/GYN services, orthopedic services, laboratory services and imaging services.
- OLV Senior Neighborhood - facilities include the Mercy Nursing Facility at OLV and Catholic Health's PACE program, known as LIFE (Living Independently for Elders) on the campus of the former Our Lady of Victory Hospital in Lackawanna.
- Mercy Nursing Facility at OLV - a 4 floor, 84-bed nursing home. It has been consistently rated one of the top nursing homes in the country.
- Partners in Rehab - a multi-disciplinary rehab location in West Seneca, offering patients several different types of therapy services.
- St. Catherine Labouré Health Care Center - a skilled nursing and rehabilitation facility located on the Sisters of Charity Hospital site on Main Street in Buffalo named after St. Catherine Labouré, Daughter of Charity who devoted her life to providing care for the elderly.
- St. Vincent Health Center - a community health center located in Buffalo offering primary care services and addiction management services.

== Corporate members and sponsors ==
- Diocese of Buffalo
- Trinity Health (Catholic Health Ministries)
- Franciscan Sisters of St. Joseph

== Leadership ==
Joyce Markiewicz - President & CEO, Catholic Health
