= 1986–1987 John Deere strike =

1980s United States manufacturing strike

- Date: August 23, 1986 – February 1, 1987 (163 days); 12:01 a.m. CDT
- Location: (Initially) 3 facilities in Waterloo and Dubuque, Iowa, and Milan, Illinois; (After lockout) 14 facilities located in Iowa, Illinois, Tennessee, Georgia, Colorado and Minnesota
- Caused by: Labor contract expiration; Disagreement over subsequent contract provisions regarding benefits; Proposal not patterned with recent Caterpillar Inc. contract
- Goals: Improved job security, retirement benefits, and cost of living adjustments (UAW); "Cost-of-living and work-rule concessions" (Deere)
- Methods: Strike action (UAW); Lockout (Deere)
- Result: Longest strike experienced by Deere & Company; Dividends for Deere stock halved; Deere fiscal year 1986 finances losses magnified; Deere inventory reduced by large amount; Strike-ending contract offered increased job security, employee insurance benefits, pension, and profit sharing

Parties
United Auto Workers	Deere & Company

Lead figures
Owen Bieber (UAW President); Bill Casstevens (UAW Vice President / Chief Negotiator); Jim Hecker (UAW Representative / Negotiator)	Boyd C. Bartlett (President and CEO) (Note: While Bartlett announced retirement on August 28, 1986, he maintained the position until March 31, 1987.); Bob Shoup (Spokesman)

Number
≈4,300 (authorized striking); ≈8,000 (disputed) (Note: The UAW's position was that they were locked-out by Deere. Deere's position was that all workers were striking.)	

Casualties
- Injuries: WQAD-TV A/V engineer allegedly assaulted

The 1986–87 John Deere strike and lockout was a conflict between Deere & Company, more commonly known as John Deere, and its employees. The workers, unionized as part of the United Auto Workers, began selective strikes at three Deere facilities on August 23, 1986. The selective strikes prompted Deere to close the rest of the facilities under the same labor contract as the original three striking locales, which the UAW, and later The New York Times, called a lockout. On February 1, 1987, workers ratified a tentative agreement which provided stronger benefits to Deere production employees. The conflict was the longest strike ever against Deere, lasting 163 days, or more than five months.

UAW Deere employees would not strike again until the 2021 John Deere strike began on October 14, 2021, 35 years later.

== Background ==
At the time of dispute, the 1980s Farm Crisis (a.k.a. Farm Depression) was occurring. Deere had been experiencing what The New York Times called "heavy losses" for years. As Bob Shoup, Deere's spokesman, said of the union's initial proposals, "They wanted more, and we had no more to give. Our business is off for six years in a row now". Shoup said in December 1986 that Deere's economic issues were present in 1982 and 1983. In August 1986, Jerome K. Green, President of Case IH, one of Deere's competitors, declared "The farm equipment market will bottom out in 1986, and there are some good things going on that will make 1987 begin to turn up." Deere's fiscal 3rd Quarter for 1986, which ended July 31, reported a loss of $39.6 million (equivalent to US$116,300,000 in 2025).

=== Pre-strike negotiations and extensions ===
UAW and Deere began negotiations for a subsequent contract early in 1986 on April 7; negotiations lasted 138 days. The contract officially expired June 1, however contract extensions were agreed upon pushing the date of expiration first to June 27 and second to October 17. The Deere workforce at the time of negotiation was 22,000 wage workers (12,000 active, 10,000 laid-off) and represented workers at facilities in Iowa, Illinois, Tennessee, Georgia, Colorado and Minnesota. According to Deere, the average wage was US$14.85 per hour (equivalent to US$43.62 in 2025).

== Course of the dispute ==
=== August 1986 ===
On Saturday, August 23, 1986, at 12:01 a.m., a selective/partial strike of about 4,300 unionized Deere & Company employees (reflecting the respective sum of 565, 3,033, and 715 of the UAW Locals 838, 94, and 74) began striking at Waterloo (foundry) and Dubuque, Iowa (industrial equipment production) and Milan, Illinois (parts distribution), respectively. UAW Vice President Bill Casstevens, one of the contract negotiators, speaking of the motivations for the strike said, "The major issues are still job security, adequate improvements in the pension and the company's attempt to emasculate our cost-of-living provisions." Casstevens stated the three plants were selected "for strategic reasons". Deere workers represented by 11 other Locals totaling around 8,000 were told to still report to work despite an expired, extended contract. Bob Shoup, spokesman for Deere, spoke of the strike saying "Deere and Co. is very disappointed that the union chose to strike, especially after so many months of attempting to arrive at an equitable new labor agreement".

On Monday, August 25, Deere & Company stopped production at the 11 other facilities covered under the union contract. Deere spokesman Bob Shoup said "Deere & Company considers the union's decision to strike three of its facilities as a strike against all Deere factories under the U.A.W. master agreement". The UAW released a statement declaring the company's action a lockout saying "If the members arrive at work and the company locks them out, the U.A.W. will consider this a lockout and the members are then instructed to apply for unemployment benefits." Shoup stated Deere did not consider the action a lockout. Deere employees who were salaried or wage employees for other/no unions continued to work after the shutdown.

Following the lockout, the UAW instructed the 8,000 workers who weren't part of the original 4300 authorized to strike to file for unemployment benefits. The 4,300 workers authorized to strike received weekly strike pay from the UAW of $100 (equivalent to US$294 in 2025). The 8,000 workers were offered $100 interest-free loans from the UAW in lieu of strike pay. All workers were asked to contribute to a newspaper advertising campaign in support of workers. UAW Local 434 President Bob Bowling stated the campaign was a reaction designed to counter Deere's press appearances regarding the dispute.

=== September 1986 ===
On Tuesday, September 2, the UAW alleged that Deere was delaying negotiations to allow itself to sell off inventory saying "Management's approach to these negotiations appears to have been designed to avoid reaching an agreement and forcing us into a protracted strike, all in a misguided effort not only to pressure your union into accepting a substandard agreement but to reduce swollen inventories of unsold equipment ... something which management has repeatedly assured us it would not do." Deere denied the allegation. The same day, Deere also did not allow 850 Ottumwa Works employees, who had been temporarily laid-off on a routine summer production shutdown, to return to work. On Wednesday, September 3, the UAW authorized 48 members of the UAW Local 1710 working at a Deere parts distributor in East Moline, Illinois to strike as well, however did not authorize 1710 members assigned to other Deere facilities.

On Tuesday, September 23, unemployment officials in Iowa and Illinois sided with Deere's position to consider all 8000 workers as striking for the purposes of unemployment and denied their claims. Deere spokesman Bob Shoup made a statement saying "The company regrets the circumstance, mainly the unnecessary strike. The employment compensation agency really had no other choice". The UAW made no comment on the decision. Unemployment coverage for the UAW workers was an issue which affected the 1986 Illinois gubernatorial election.

At an unknown time during the strike, WQAD-TV (known as "News 8"), a local news station in Moline, Illinois, reported one of their audiovisual engineers was allegedly assaulted by three union members who pushed them to the ground. Archival footage shows police warning off news media from a picket line of UAW Local 79 members. The engineers were unable to identify their alleged assailants to police.

=== October 1986 ===
By the week of October 5, the seventh week of strike, communication between the UAW and Deere had been minimal. Winston Williams, writing for The New York Times, saw Deere's behavior as part of a pattern of corporate lockouts to "force further concessions from giveback-weary unions" citing lockouts and lockout threats affecting previously implacable unions such as the United Steelworkers, the Oil, Chemical and Atomic Workers International Union, Transport Workers Union of America, and the International Longshoremen's Association around the same time period. Williams also saw the UAW as surprised by Deere's "newfound feistiness", quoting UAW Vice President, Administration John Collins saying, "What do you do? You can't control the actions of management."

At 10:00 a.m. on Tuesday, October 28, UAW and Deere representatives reopened negotiations after discussing rules and scheduling the previous day. There had been no communication or negotiation since the strike began. Karl Mantyla, a UAW official, stated information about negotiations would be minimal saying "In terms of substantive information from the negotiating sessions, there just won't be any, I think both sides are going to try to confine activities to the bargaining table".

=== November 1986 ===
On Friday, November 21, the UAW indefinitely recessed negotiations with Deere citing a complete lack of understanding by the company in the 26 days. UAW official Bill Casstevens said the union found "no meaningful progress toward an equitable settlement", and accused the company of bad-faith negotiations saying "It is now apparent that Deere's request to resume negotiations, and a recent letter sent to Deere employees, amounted to nothing more than a cruel public relations ploy by the company". Deere spokesman Bob Shoup said "'Deere & Co. deeply regrets the union decision to end negotiations for a new contract. In the end, the stumbling block was the cost to the company of the union's current demands." Deere had also proposed a further contract extension to February 27, 1987, which the union rejected.

On Wednesday, November 26, Deere proposed reopening negotiations with the UAW by the beginning of December. The company offered what Deere spokesman Bob Shoup called a "comprehensive new contract proposal", and wished the union to review it. The UAW first learned of the new proposal through the news media, a fact Jim Hecker, UAW representative and negotiator, lamented saying "I don't appreciate that" but despite that the union was "ready, willing and able to meet with (the company) all weekend if that's what it takes". That Friday, November 28, the UAW stated they would examine the proposal before agreeing to talks. The UAW's Jim Hecker stated, "A settlement needs to be within the perimeters of the most recent settlement with Caterpillar, and the company has stated its willing to do that. This proposal does not show that interest on their part, so I don't know what the company's up to". Deere's Bob Shoup stated the company's offer was sincere.

=== December 1986 ===
A two-hour negotiation session on Wednesday, December 3 between the UAW and Deere resulted in another suspension of negotiations as both sides found the other immovable: Deere saying the UAW's proposal was "totally incomprehensible" and the UAW, in the words of Bill Casstevens, called Deere's proposal "woefully inadequate to meet the needs of our members".

The next day on Thursday, December 4, an estimated 700 striking UAW members held a peaceful mock funeral at Deere company headquarters in Moline, Illinois. One worker's sign epitomized the mood of the event reading, "Your trust was buried here today. Your team work is a flop. If your ship is sinking, it's because it is leaking from the top". UAW Local 94 (Dubuque, Iowa) president Pat Dillon told the assembled workers "The mutual relationship between Deere and Company and the union has been non-existent the last four months. They reap what they sow". The demonstration involved a hearse, coffin, pallbearers, the bugling of Taps, headstone reading "RIP UAW-JD team work", and a Christmas tree covered in worker's John Deere hats. Upon laying the symbolic coffin to rest, workers proceeded to burn the coffin and tree, loudly crying, "the winning team has just gone up in smoke", before planting fourteen white crosses representing the elapsed weeks of conflict. The Rock Island County deputy sheriffs and Illinois State Police observed alongside Deere's private security without interacting.

On Wednesday, December 10, Deere's fiscal year 1986 financials were released showing a loss of $229.3 million (equivalent to US$649,800,000 in 2025), its first year reporting a loss since 1933 during the Great Depression. Most of the financial losses were experienced during the 4th Quarter, which ended on October 31, during which North American sales decreased 37 percent. The company stated most of the losses were due to the strike and attributed $139.7 million (equivalent to US$395,900,000 in 2025) due to it. However, losses were also due to the ongoing 1980s Farm Crisis. In comparison, in 1985, the company had profited $30.5 million (equivalent to US$86,400,000 in 2025). Company inventory decreased significantly due to both the strike and sales losses, and Deere declared the inventory reductions would endure into 1987. The UAW had previously accused the company of using the strike to reduce inventory in September.

The day after on Thursday, December 11, Deere's Board of Directors reduced stock dividends from 12.5₵ to 6.25₵ per share. The same day, the strike, at 111 days in length, became the longest the company had ever endured, a record Jim Hecker, a UAW representative, called "a dubious honor". The previous record was a 1950 dispute also involving the UAW. The same day, Deere's Board allowed UAW officials, most notably Bill Casstevens, to present directly to them in a private session lasting 50 minutes. Casstevens reported, "The board was very courteous, they listened very attentively to our presentation. They asked questions to make sure they understood our position. ... We went in there to make sure they knew exactly where the union stood on this proposal because we have believed for a long time now that company negotiators have been making worst case scenarios out of all of our proposals". Casstevens also stated that Deere was profiting in 1982-3 while competitor Caterpillar Inc. was experiencing losses, to which Deere spokesman Bob Shoup stated the 1980s Farm Crisis was ongoing when the current, expired contract was being developed in 1982 and signed in 1983.

=== Early 1987 and strike end ===
On Monday, January 26, 1987, a state court ordered the resumption of negotiations between the UAW and Deere. The following day, a tentative agreement was announced after a seven-hour mediated (Note: Mediator was W.J. Usery) session of negotiations. The agreement had potential to end the strike pending ratification by a union member vote, which was scheduled to take place the following weekend. Deere spokesman Bob Shoup stated the company was "very pleased" with the agreement, but that the strike had injured company-union relations, which he said would require "a little time to heal, and they will".

On Sunday, February 1, the tentative agreement, a 20-month contract, was ratified with the support of 84 percent of the 10,651 UAW member votes ending the strike. only being rejected by UAW Locals 434 and 1710 in Moline and Milan, Illinois, respectively, who felt the job security provisions were substandard and allowed for slower, gradual job loss through consolidation or deprecation. The contract, based on a UAW contract with Caterpillar Inc., included job security for 90 percent of employees, health and life insurance, retirement pension, profit sharing, maintained cost-of-living adjustments, and a one-time payment of $735 (equivalent to US$2,080 in 2025). However, it did not change general wage rates.

On February 2, approximately 9,250 (Note: Source said roughly 75% of 12,300 active workers, this is just a simple computation of this for clarity.) active UAW members returned to Deere facilities, some overnight shifts as early as midnight. Deere spokesman Bob Shoup said the company believed production would be back to normal "in a matter of a couple weeks". Jim Hecker, UAW spokesman, stated regarding the strike ending, "I'm glad it's done – get everybody back to work and get things settled back down. It's going to take a while for everything to settle down, but we'll just have to work through it." The strike, the longest in Deere's history, lasted 163 days. The same day, Deere began recalling or planning to recall laid-off workers across the Midwest, 600 in Waterloo, Iowa and nearly 400 in the Quad Cities area. Deere's salaried workers expressed relief, as they had been required to work jobs during the strike previously done by the UAW workers. Workers lost a maximum of $10,000 (equivalent to US$28,300 in 2025) in foregone wages during the strike. Shearson-American Express estimated the economic losses in the Quad Cities area to be about $40 million (equivalent to US$113,400,000 in 2025) with a larger economic effect of at least $100 million (equivalent to US$283,000,000 in 2025).

On March 12, 1987, an Associated Press article published in The New York Times tied the recently resolved Deere dispute, which it called a "combination strike and lockout", with a month-long strike at the American Telephone and Telegraph Company and a six-month lockout by USX Corporation of the United Steelworkers of America. The Times wrote, "In all three cases, the companies were demanding further wage and benefit cuts, elimination of annual cost-of-living adjustments, or an end to restrictions on their ability to farm out work to nonunion suppliers". Prof. Leo Troy, an economics professor at Rutgers University, told the Times that the concession-weary unions faced a struggle given the economic conditions at the time.
