= General Confederation of Lebanese Workers =

CGTL
- General Confederation of Lebanese Workers
- Confédération Générale des Travailleurs du Liban
- Location: Lebanon
- Members: 200,000
- Key people: Ghassan Ghosn, president

The General Confederation of Lebanese Workers (CGTL) (in French Confédération Générale des Travailleurs Libanais (CGTL), in Arabic الإتحاد العمالي العام في لبنان) is a national trade union center in Lebanon. It was founded in 1958, and has a membership of 200,000. The original president of the confederation, Antoine Bechara, was president from 1983 to 1991 and created its logo.

During the 1996 economic crisis the Confederation of Trade Unions (CTU) called a general strike on 28 November with the slogan “Bread, Education, Freedom”. The demonstrations were broken up by the army and police with 50 detained.

The following spring Ilyas Abu Rizq, the newly re-elected President of the Lebanese General Labour Confederation (GLC) was arrested by the security forces and charged with “usurping political authority “ and “disseminating false Information”. He was re-arrested in May and June and was adopted as a prisoner of conscience by Amnesty International. He was replaced as leader of the GLC by Ghanim Zughbi in a ‘sham’ election. Zughbi called a general strike which was mostly ignored. He was criticised for failing to condemn security service violence. Abu Rizk launched a rival organisation the Independent GLC which was recognised by the ILO and supported by the National Federation of Workers and Employees, the largest member organisation of the GLC.
