= 2012 timeline of the Somali Civil War =

This is a 2012 timeline of events in the Somali Civil War (2009–present).

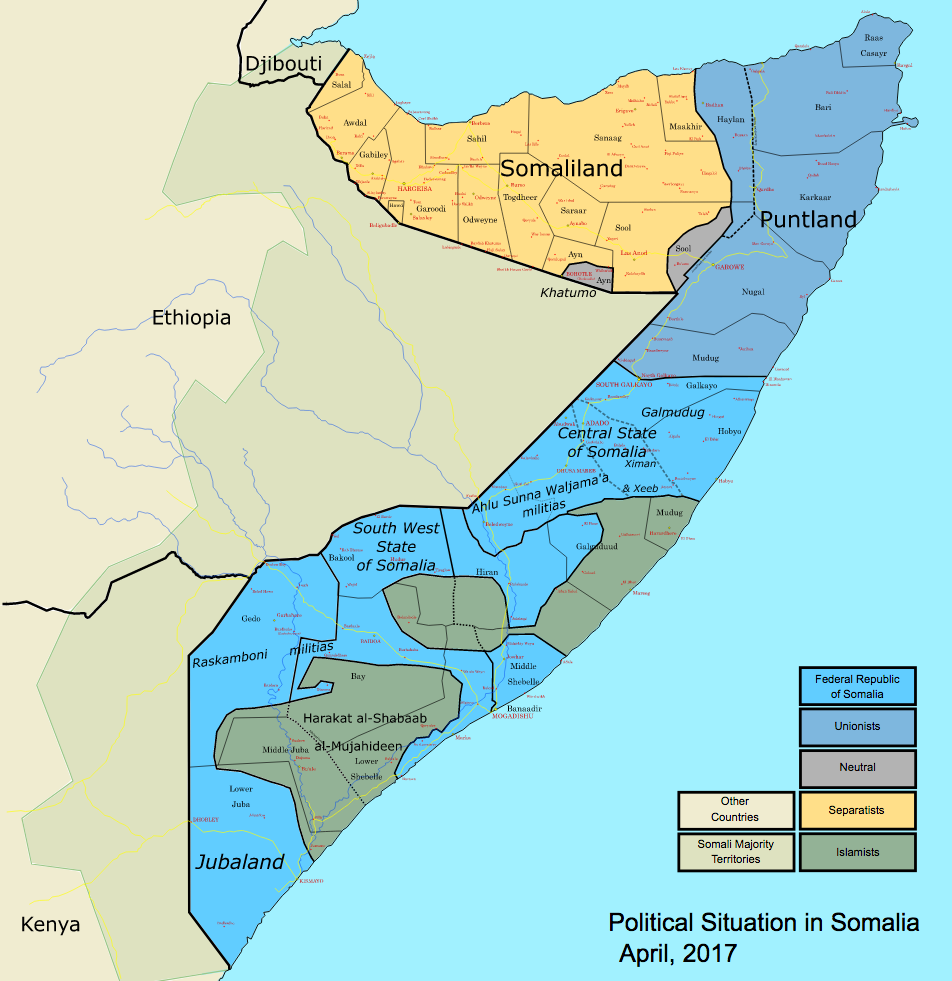
Current situation in Somalia

== January ==
=== January 7 ===
- Kenyan military claims that it had killed 60 Al-Shabaab fighters with an air strike. A Kenyan army spokesperson also said that 20 al-Shabaab fighters had defected.

=== January 20 ===
- Transitional Federal Government forces and their AMISOM allies launch a successful offensive against al-Shabaab positions on the northern outskirts of Mogadishu. The move was intended to secure the city's outer perimeters from external attack. Two AMISOM soldiers were wounded in the ensuing battle.

=== January 24 ===
- Al-Shabaab launches a suicide attack against an Ethiopian military base in Beledweyne. The group claims it killed 10 Ethiopian soldiers.

== February ==
=== February 15 ===
- African Union forces say they launched a major assault on Afgoye, an important al-Shabab base in Southern Somalia. A BBC Correspondent said an African Union force of 100 tanks and armoured vehicles were within 10 km of Afgoye.

=== February 18 ===
- Somali police arrested a suspicious driver. While waiting for a bomb disposal unit in front of the criminal investigations department a bomb in the car detonated injuring two police officers. Al-Shabab claimed the bomb was detonated remotely.

=== Februdary 22 ===
- Reuters report Ethiopian and Somali troops seized the strategic city of Baidoa after al-Shabab withdrew earlier in the day.

=== February 24 ===
- An air strike in the al-Shabab-held K60 region destroyed two cars and killed at least six people including foreigners. It is unknown who carried out the attack. Kenya denied any involvement.

== March ==
=== March 2 ===
- African Union forces and pro-government militia captured Maslah, an important al-Shabaab base 5 km north of Mogadishu.
- Al Shabaab fighters attacked Puntland checkpoints at Bosasso on March 2 and Baliqadar on March 3 morning. Al Shabaab spokesman said the group has killed 32 Puntland soldiers and lost three of its own fighters. Puntland soldiers pursuing the militia after the attack killed seven insurgents.

=== March 3 ===
- Militants from al-Shabaab took over Diif in Lower Juba. Kenyan army along with TGF and Ras Kamboni clan militia managed to retake the village the following day after several hours of fighting.

=== March 10 ===
- Al-Shabaab fighters clashed with Ethiopian army in the village of Yurkut in what is described "the most intense fighting since Ethiopian forces entered Somalia" that left 40 Ethiopian soldiers killed.

=== March 19 ===
- Dozens of mortar rounds were fired at Somalia's presidential compound in Mogadishu but missed and landed on a nearby refugee camp, killing six civilians. Al-Shabaab claimed responsibility for the attack, the first of such kind since August 2011.

=== March 20 ===
- Al Shabaab raided Dhusamareb at dawn, briefly captured the city then fled after intense fighting with Ahlu Sunna Waljama'a (ASWJ) fighters, which claimed 100 Al Shabaab militants were killed. Al Shabaab denied the claim and announce it had killed 15 ASWJ troops and captured 6 vehicles.
- Al Shabaab fighters again recaptured Diif in Lower Jubba region, without any resistance, from Raskamboni militia led by pro-Somalia government Sheik Ahmed Modobe, who abandoned the area before insurgents poured in. Al Shabaab militants however fled the town after briefly occupying it for few hours, paving way for TFG and Raskamboni troops to return taking full control of the town. There are reports of air strikes bombing Diif in the aftermath of its capture, killing 37 al-Shabaab fighters.

=== March 22 ===
- Ethiopian and Somali troops seized Hudur, the administrative headquarters of Bakool region from al-Shabaab militants.

=== March 23 ===
- Kenyan jets carried out an airstrike on the outskirts of Fafadun town near Kenya border, hitting three al-Shabaab training camps. At least 10 al-Shabab fighters were killed and 25 others, including woman and children, were injured.

=== March 24 ===
- Central Somalia front: ASWJ fighters liberate Waradhumale and Gobo from al-Shabaab forces while large Ethiopian forces begin to move into Guri'el and Dhusamareb, prepare for an offensive on the al-Shabaab controlled town of El Bur situated 100 km away.

=== March 26 ===
- Ethiopian troops and the pro-government militia Ahlu Sunna Waljama'a seize the Central Somali town of El Bur.

=== March 30 ===
- AMISOM reported that African Union troops and Somali government forces attacked and seized the key district of Deynile near Mogadishu, which served as a staging ground for al-Shabaab forces attacking Mogadishu, Afgoye, Balad, and other major cities. Despite denials by al-Shabaab spokesmen, African Union troops claimed to have captured the entire area, including an airstrip and a local hospital. 20 al-Shabaah fighters and one Burundian soldier were reportedly killed.

=== March 31 ===
- Fresh fightings erupted east of Jowhar in region of Middle Shabelle between al-Shabaab and local militia, leaving 8 people dead.

== April ==
=== April 4 ===
- A bomb exploded at the reopened national theater in Mogadishu, where Somali Prime Minister Abdiweli Mohamed Ali and several other dignitaries were commemorating the first anniversary of the launch of Somalia's first national television station. Eight people were confirmed to be killed in the blast. Among the dead were Aden Yabarow Wiish, who served as President of the Somali Olympic Committee, and Said Mohamed Nuir, Chief of the Somali Football Federation. Prime Minister Mohamed escaped unharmed. Al-Shabaab claimed responsibility for the attack, having used improvised explosives rather than committing to a suicide attack.

=== April 9 ===
- An explosion occurred in a busy marketplace in the city of Baidoa after a bomb planted in a basket was detonated; the local governor reported that at least twelve people were killed in the blast, most of them allegedly women and children. The bombing occurred just as Somali forces loyal to the government and African Union peacekeepers arrived to reinforce their hold on the city. It has yet to be determined who's responsible for the blast, though most suspect al-Shabaab as the likely culprit.

=== April 11 ===
- To reinforce their ties with al-Qaeda elements in nearby Yemen, militants loyal to al-Shabaab are reportedly moving northward towards the Golis mountain range, located in the Bari and Sanaag regions. The President of the autonomous Puntland region Abdirahman Farole has announced his intention to deploy military forces to respond to any threat posed by the insurgents to the territory.

=== April 28 ===
- A South African private security contractor is killed by gunmen while on a mission targeting pirates in Puntland.

=== April 29 ===
- Al Shabaab insurgents clashed with Somali and AMISOM forces in Dharkenley and Hoosh district, north of Mogadishu, killing 4 civilians. In a separate incident, 3 people are killed and 10 injured in Hodan district when Al Shabaab attacks a movie theater by grenades.

=== April 30 ===
- At least 11 people were killed when Al Shabaab insurgents clashed with Somali and Ethiopian troops in an overnight attack at Hudur.

== May ==
=== May 1 ===
- Seven people, including two MPs were killed in a suicide bombing in Dusa Mareb. Several other MPs and prominent politicians, including former Security Minister Ahmed Abdi Salam, were also injured. Al-Shabaab claimed it was behind the attack.

=== May 19 ===
- Multiple explosions in various locations in Mogadishu kills 7 TFG and AMISOM troops in addition to 1 civilian, and injures at least 15 other people. Meanwhile, joint Somalia-Kenya forces took part in heavy fighting against al-Shabaab near the village of Tabta.

=== May 25 ===
- Somali government forces backed by African Union tanks reportedly capture the Islamist stronghold of Afgooye, located on the outskirts of Mogadishu. The town was considered strategically important, as it offered al-Shabaab insurgents direct access to the capital. Thousands of people on the outskirts of the town fled toward Mogadishu and Afgooye ahead of the offensive, with international aid now likely to reach them. No civilian casualties were reported. According to the BBC, securing Afgooye essentially cuts the militant group's controlled territory in half.

=== May 29 ===
- Kenyan naval forces shell Kismayo after al-Shabaab insurgents opened fire on Kenyan patrol vessels on the Somali littoral.
- Militants ambush a convoy of vehicles carrying President Sharif Ahmed travelling from the newly liberated town of Afgoye back to Mogadishu. The attack was repelled and Ahmed returned safely to the capital.

=== May 31 ===
- Somali government forces and African Union troops from Kenya capture Afmadow from al-Shabaab, a southern town considered important in the military campaign owing to its network of roads that grant access to many different parts of the country. Prime Minister of Somalia Ali also announces that Kismayo, situated 115 km (71 miles) to the south and the seat of al-Shabaab's headquarters, would be the next likely target, followed by other towns and cities in the larger region.

== June ==
=== June 6 ===
- Tensions reported by local residents in the Bari province of Puntland, after the autonomous region's government forces clashed with Ras-Casayr militias. Puntland officials indicate that they entered the town of Bargaal to repel pirates.

=== June 11 ===
- Self-appointed President of Ras-Casayr enclave in the Bari province renounces sovereignty claims, indicating that he is content with the Puntland government's development projects in the region and averring that he will now support the administration.

=== June 16 ===
- A suicide car bombing at a military base in Afogye where Somali and African Union soldiers were staying kills two Somali soldiers and injures three civilians. Al-Shabaab assumes responsibility for the explosion. No AU injuries were reported, but al-Shabaab claims that it killed several AMISOM soldiers.

=== June 22 ===
- Al-Shabaab fighters ambush a Somali military convoy in the Elasha Biyaha neighborhood of Mogadishu, killing the local police chief.

=== June 23 ===
- AMISOM troops wrest control of the Middle Shabelle region's Esaley Airstrip and Elma'an Port from al-Shabaab. Situated about 37 km northeast of Mogadishu, the Esaley Airstrip was strategically important for the insurgent group since it was used by the militants to transport illicit weapons and to fly in foreign fighters from the Gulf of Aden.

=== June 26 ===
- Somali government forces assisted by AMISOM soldiers and tanks capture the al-Shabaab stronghold of Balad, situated 30 km (20 miles) to the north of Mogadishu, in addition to the surrounding villages. The insurgents reportedly fled the area prior to the arrival of the allied troops. Securing Balad gives the Somali authorities and AMISOM control of a key bridge over the Shebelle River leading toward Jowhar and more northerly areas.

== July ==
=== July 11 ===
- AMISOM and pro-government forces captured the al-Shabaab stronghold of Lanta-Buro 25 miles (40 km) west of Mogadishu; the city had been one of al-Shabaab's primary training bases for militant forces across the country. The city was reportedly abandoned by al-Shabaab before the offensive force arrived and no fighting was reported. According to the combined Somali-AMISOM leadership, the next target of the offensive would be the coastal city of Merka.

== August ==
=== August 4 ===
- Somali forces engaged in battle with al-Shabaab insurgents in the town of Qansah Dhere, at least 15 people were killed.

=== August 8 ===
- Kenyan jets bombed an al Shabaab base near the Birta-Dheer village north of Kismayu. Kenyan forces also reportedly massing tanks and artillery around Biibi village, 85 km north of Kismayu in an attempt to take this port town.

=== August 12 ===
- Two Uganda People's Defence Force MI-24 helicopters flying from Entebbe, Uganda to Somalia crashed in rugged terrain in Kenya. They were found two days later, burned out, with no likely survivors from the 10 Ugandan servicemen on board. Another aircraft from the same flight crashed on Mount Kenya and all of its seven Ugandan servicemen were rescued a day later.

=== August 16 ===
- Kenyan Defense Forces stationed in Southern Somalia as part of AMISOM were reported to have engaged in combat with as many as a thousand al-Shabaab militants who attempted to assault the Kenyan garrison in Fafadhun. The Kenyan forces however were said to have successfully repulsed the attack, with at least two Kenyan soldiers and at least 73 al-Shabaab militants reported dead as a result of the fighting. After the remaining attackers fled, the Kenyan forces reportedly captured forty guns and six trucks abandoned by al-Shabaab in their retreat. The increased Kenyan presence in the area is part of Kenya's effort to reinforce the security of its southern border with Somalia and as part of AMISOM's effort to eventually retake the al-Shabaab stronghold of Kismayo.

=== August 27 ===
- Somali government forces assisted by AMISOM troops capture the port town of Merca from al-Shabaab. Residents indicate that the militants had fled a few hours earlier to Kismayo, which represents the outfit's last major stronghold.

=== August 29 ===
- Somali government forces backed by African Union troops battle al-Shabaab militants in the villages of Aglibah, Janaay, Abdulle and Birta Dheer, situated between Afmadow and Kismayo. According to General Ismail Sahardiid, the commander in charge of Somali Army troops in the Lower Jubba region, over 60 insurgents died in the crossfire. Al-Shabaab claims in turn to have killed dozens of government soldiers in the ensuing gun battle. With the allied forces reportedly around 50 kilometers (31 miles) near Kismayo, General Sahardiid indicates that his men are advancing toward the stronghold with caution but expect to capture it within a period of seven days. According to a local resident, al-Shabaab have also positioned armored vehicles on the circumference of the town and are patrolling the area in heavy battle gear and wagons.

== September ==
=== September 1 ===
- Somali government forces assisted by African Union troops continue their march toward Kismayo, capturing the southern town of Miido, situated 86 km from the al-Shabaab stronghold. As many as 36 insurgents were reportedly slain in the assault. AMISOM also deny claims that the insurgents had seized back Afmadow, and dismiss as "untrue Al Shabaab propaganda" reports that the militant group had gunned down an AU helicopter. Additionally, an AMISOM spokesman characterizes as a "very despicable and a shameful act" photos released by al-Shabaab showing bodies of four allied soldiers being dragged through the Kismayo streets.

=== September 3 ===
- In support of the Somali army's offensive in Kismayo against al-Shabaab, AMISOM soldiers backed by KDF vessels and helicopters reach the nearby town of Harbole. The move comes after intensive attacks since August 31 by allied forces against nearby Islamist bases, which resulted in 36 militant casualties. Ugandan and Burundian AU troops are reportedly making their way southward toward the stronghold, with the Kenyan contingent within AMISOM providing facilitative assistance. The combined forces are awaiting for military authorization to launch the ground offensive.

=== September 4 ===
- As part of an offensive by AMISOM, the Kenyan navy shells the Islamist stronghold of Kismayo. According to local residents, hundreds of people begin fleeing the area ahead of an expected land-based assault, with most heading for Jilib to the north and the Somali government-controlled port of Merca.
- Somali government forces assisted by African Union troops capture the port of El-ma'an from al-Shabaab, situated on the outskirts of Mogadishu. According to Daud Hajji Iro, the Middle Shabelle region's spokesman, the insurgents abandoned the town after a bout of fighting. The Islamist group was reportedly unavailable for comment.

=== September 5 ===
- Somali government forces and allied AMISOM troops continue their march toward Kismayo, advancing from the liberated Miido to the nearby town of Biibi. Around 200 al-Shabaab insurgents and a few senior commanders in Afmadow also surrender to the coalition forces. The defections are interpreted as substantially enhancing the allied offensive since the insurgents could provide details on al-Shabaab's combat strategy. Additionally, AMISOM's Ugandan and Burundian contingents in Harbole await clearance to attack Kismayo, with Kenyan AU troops preparing to launch an assault from Jilib and Bulla-Hajji in the Jubba region. Residents of Kismayo simultaneously continue to leave the port for the eastern cities of Barawe and Merca ahead of the planned offensive.

=== September 18 ===
- Somali government forces assisted by AMISOM troops continue their march towards Kismayo. Local residents report that al-Shabaab militants are leaving the port in trucks and buses with heavy weaponry in tow, in the direction of Jilib to the northeast. The insurgents also reportedly free some prisoners before exiting. Al-Shabaab dismiss the claims as "blatant lies" and suggest that affairs in Kismayo are "business as usual." An estimated 5,200 people have fled the town since the start of the month ahead of the offensive. According to Somali National Army General Ismail Sahareed, his forces defeated the insurgents in confrontations a few days earlier, and the SNA, which is positioned about 67 km away, is now preparing to close in on Kismayo; AMISOM forces are in turn reportedly stationed about 39 km from the city, in the town of Jana Cabdalla. Al-Shabaab claim instead to have killed around 100 Somali government soldiers and AU troops from Kenya. Additionally, a spokesperson with the US Navy admits that an American warship is positioned near the port, but suggests that it is there for maintenance purposes. He also asserts that he does not know if the vessel intends to alight on the city.

=== September 22 ===
- An additional 200 al-Shabaab insurgents in the town of Garsale near Jowhar surrender to allied troops. This followed a round of internal battles between rival militants, which left eight of the outfit's fighters dead, including two top commanders. AMISOM announces in a press statement that it expects the total number of al-Shabaab defections in the area to reach 250 men.

=== September 24 ===
- Somali National Army spokesman Adan Mohamed Hirsi accuses Kenyan troops of intentionally killing seven Somali civilians in a joint Somali-AMISOM operation in Janay Abdalla village. The murders came after an earlier ambush attempt by al-Shabaab against Somali and Kenyan soldiers. The young men were in the process of buying sugar when they were shot down, and two other civilians were reportedly also injured. According to BBC correspondent Gabriel Gatehouse, Kenyan forces have already been accused of indiscriminately killing civilians when they shelled Kismayo from warships operating off of the port city's coastline. Hirsi condemns the latest murders and requests that the Somali authorities take action. AU spokesman Col. Ali Aden also indicates that an investigation into the incident has been launched and appropriate action will be pursued once it concludes.
- Hizbul Islam spokesman Mohamed Moallim announces that his group is discontinuing its association with al-Shabaab, an outfit that he asserts his organization had only nominally united with. Moallim cites the significant political changes happening in Somalia as well as al-Shabaab's reported issuance of propaganda against Hizbul Islam as the primary reasons for his group's decision to leave the coalition. He adds that his organization does not share al-Shabaab's political philosophy, and that he feels the militant group has been considerably "weakened". Moallim also indicates that Hizbul Islam is open to talks with any political actors in the country working for a common good.

=== September 25 ===
- Fighter jets belonging to AMISOM's Kenyan contingent bombard an airport armoury and warehouse in Kismayo that was used by al-Shabaab. Although casualty figures are uncertain, Ali Mohamud Rage, a spokesman for the Islamist group, indicates that there are no deaths or property damage, but that "the Kenyan airforce was maybe trying to boost the morale of its demoralised soldiers." Kenyan troops are reportedly positioned around 40 km from Kismayo. They have been striving to defeat al-Shabaab militants in the city since they first deployed soldiers to southern Somalia in 2011.

=== September 28 ===
- According to AMISOM official Col. Cyrus Oguna, the Somali National Army and Kenyan AU naval, air and ground forces launched a surprise attack on Kismayo, capturing the city with little resistance mounted by al-Shabaab. The spokesman asserts that the insurgents incurred "heavy losses" during the offensive, whereas no allied soldiers were wounded or killed. Fighters from the Ras Kamboni militia also reportedly assisted the SNA and AU troops, who led the charge. Al-Shabaab's military operations spokesman Sheikh Abdiasis Abu Musab states that "fierce fighting" is underway between his comrades and the Somali and AMISOM forces. Local residents similarly indicate that the allied troops have seized the port, but the militants are still present elsewhere in the town and are quickly making their way toward the frontlines in vehicles. The Islamist group's propaganda radio station is also still reportedly broadcasting material and allegedly attempting to trick residents into fleeing toward the oncoming Somali government and AMISOM troops. Kismayo is regarded as al-Shabaab's last major stronghold on account of the revenue that the group has been able to generate for itself through exporting charcoal and levying port taxes on imported goods. Col. Oguna indicates that capturing the city "may signal the end of al-Shabab because Kismayo has been the bastion which has financed activities of the al-Shabab in other regions of Somalia". Owing to uncertainty as to who will administer the town after the Islamists have been completely ousted, the AU spokesman adds that the offensive was "meticulously planned".

== October ==
=== October 14 ===
- Somali government soldiers assisted by AMISOM troops capture the strategically important town of Wanla Weyn, located 93 km northwest of Mogadishu. The victory permits a direct route connecting the capital with the recently secured city of Baidoa. According to Somali government and AU officials, it also cuts off al-Shabaab's access to other regions, and denies the militants another key source of funds. Additionally, the allied forces seize control of a former Somali Air Force (SAF) base, situated within 15 km of Wanla Weyn.

=== October 29 ===
- Somali military sources report that General Mohamed Ibrahim Farah (Gordan) is killed in an ambush attack by al-Shabaab insurgents. The surprise assault occurred in the town of El Waregow, near the port of Marko (Merca). Al-Shabaab did not comment on the assassination.

== November ==
=== November 12 ===
- At least 7 soldiers and 3 civilians were killed in an ambush by al-Shabaab insurgents on an Ethiopian convoy near Baidoa.

=== November 25 ===
- Al Shabaab fighters attack Bulohawo near the border with Kenya. They briefly took control of the small town before retreating to the Somali army. Twelve people from both sides were reportedly killed.

== December ==
=== December 9 ===
- Somali government forces assisted by AMISOM troops capture the al-Shabaab stronghold of Jowhar, situated 90 kilometres (60 miles) north of Mogadishu.

=== December 17 ===
- Al-Shabaab posts a message on Twitter publicly chastising the group's senior American commander Abu Mansoor al-Amriki (Omar Shafik Hammami) for releasing videos in a "narcissistic pursuit of fame." The tweet also asserts that attempts behind the scenes by the outfit to talk to al-Amriki were in vain, so al-Shabaab was morally obligated to divulge his "obstinacy".

=== December 18 ===
- Somalia national army (SNA) and Kenya defense forces have taken control of Kudha and Madhawa islands which are some 130 km (81 miles) to the West of Kismayo. Al-shabaab militants withdraw from Kudha island before the allied forces entered. But there was fighting in Madhawa.

== See also ==
- Somali Civil War (2009–present)
- 2009 timeline of the Somali Civil War
- 2010 timeline of the Somali Civil War
- 2011 timeline of the Somali Civil War
- 2013 timeline of the Somali Civil War
