= 2011 timeline of the Somali Civil War =

This is a 2011 timeline of events in the Somali Civil War (2009–present).

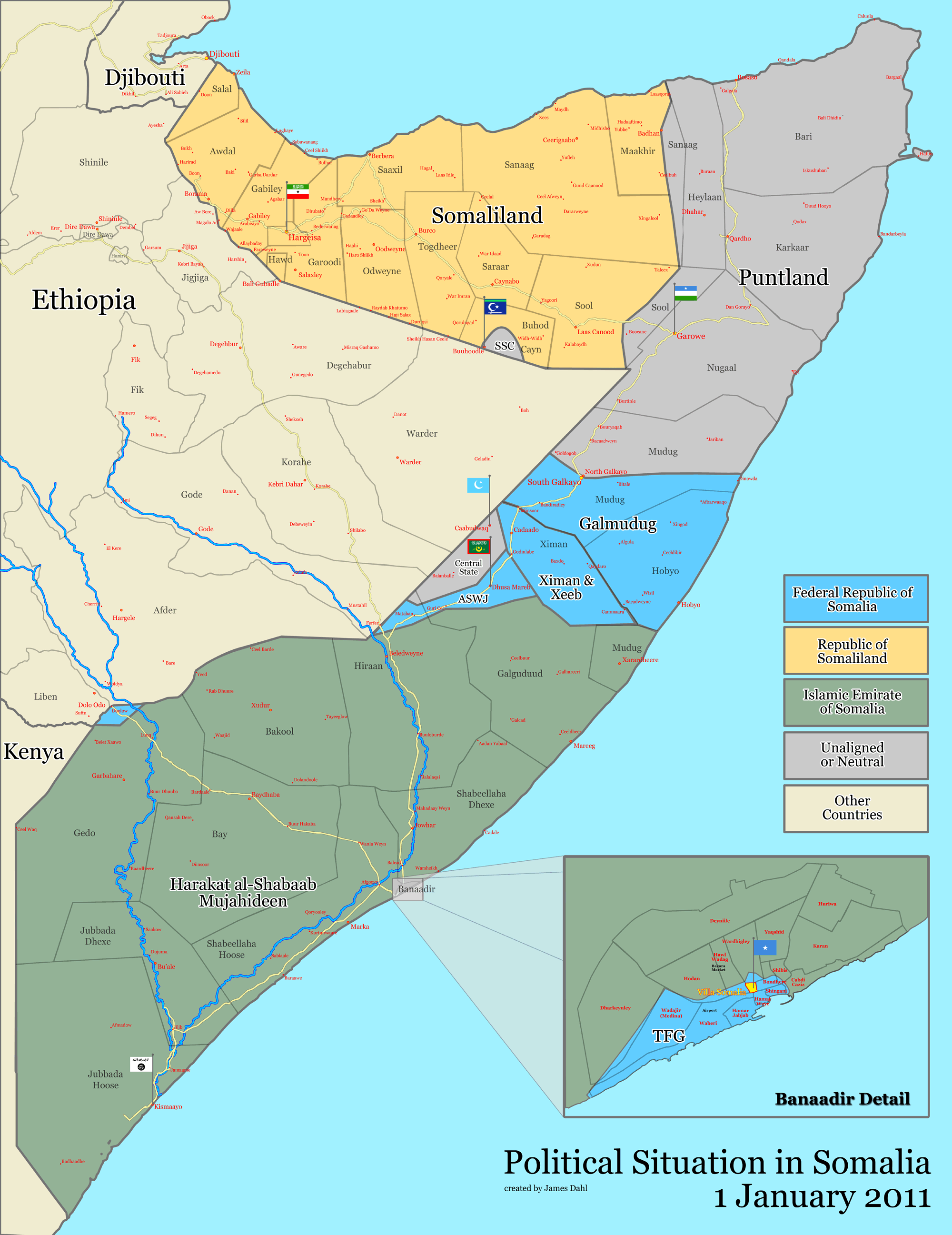
Situation in Somalia as of January 1, 2011

== January ==
=== January 3, 2011 ===
- 3 TFG soldiers killed, 7 injured.

TFG soldiers mutinied in Mogadishu near the presidential palace due to non-payment of wages. Witnesses say the mutiny caused 3 TFG soldier deaths and injured another seven.

- 1 Ahlu Sunna Waljama'a militant killed, 2 injured.

A bomb exploded at a checkpoint in Dharkenley District of Mogadishu, when Ahlu Sunna and TFG soldiers were searching the scene after the first explosion when a second bomb exploded. The blast killed one Ahlu Sunna militant and injured another two.

=== January 5, 2011 ===
- 1 person killed, 3 others injured.

Al-Shabab militants attacked TFG and AMISOM military bases in Mogadishu's Hodan District, killing 1 person and injuring 3 others.

- disputed, 3 civilians injured, or two people killed and 1 injured.

In Mogadishu's Banadir intersection, TFG soldiers in an armed government vehicle were attacked by a hand grenade.

=== January 6, 2011 ===
- 4 civilians killed, 3 injured.

Fighting between TFG soldiers in Mogadishu's Wadajir district killed 4 civilians and injured 3.

=== January 10, 2011 ===
- 1 Burundian soldier killed.

A Burundian soldier was ambushed by an al-Shabab militant in Mogadishu. This was the first reported death among the AMISOM soldiers in 2011.

=== January 13, 2011 ===
- 2 TFG soldiers injured, 1 civilian injured.

A roadside bomb injured three people, including two TFG soldiers in Mogadishu. Witnesses said after the bombing TFG soldiers opened fired indiscriminately, and later temporarily detained everyone in the area.

=== January 14, 2011 ===
- 1 civilian killed, 4 wounded.

Al-Shabab clashed with AMISOM peacekeepers and TFG soldiers in Mogadishu, with most clashes occurring in the Hodan District. Al-Shabab started the clashes by launching hit and run attacks on AMISOM and TFG positions, causing both sides to later exchange artillery fire. Some initial reports suggested that stray mortars hit Bakaara market.

=== January 18, 2011 ===
- 3 Somali soldiers killed.

In Mogadishu, 3 TFG soldiers were executed by the Somali government. Abdul Azeez for killing another soldier, Wowlid Mohammed for confessing to murdering a government civil servant in 2010, and Antob Arabow for murdering Hassan Mohammed, a civilian.

- Over 30 people killed, 60 injured, mostly civilians.

Al-Shabab bombarded the TFG parliament building with mortars, which AMISOM responded to by continuously firing shells for several hours. During the engagement, al-shabab and AMISOM exchanged mortar fire and heavy shelling in Mogadishu, mostly in Siiney and Bakaara market. Witnesses said over 30 people died and 60 were injured, most deaths being civilians.

=== January 20, 2011 ===
- 4 people killed, 8 injured.

TFG and AMISOM troops clashed with al-Shabab, killing 4 and injuring 8, according to locals and witnesses. Al-Shabab started the clashes by launching hit and run attacks on Somali military bases in the districts of Hodan, Howlawdag and Bondhere. In Mogadishu, heavy gun fire and artillery fire could be heard.

- 2 Somali soldiers, 3 injured.

TFG soldiers clashed among themselves in the Hiran region of central Somalia, leaving at least two soldiers dead and 3 injured. The confrontation is said to have broken out after some soldiers tried to take over a checkpoint at the Kalabeyrka junction outside Beledweyne.

=== January 21, 2011 ===
- 8 Somali pirates

A raid launched by the South Korean army backed by a helicopter of the U.S. military to rescue a hijacked ship with its 21 crew members on board has resulted in 8 deaths among the pirates.

== February ==
=== February 9, 2011 ===
- 14 Somali soldiers killed

A battle between a Somaliland militia backed by the Somaliland military fought against a Puntland militia leaving a confirmed 5 Somaliland soldiers dead and 12 Dhulbahante militia members dead. Estimates for total dead are 87.

In Mogadishu, insurgents attacked a government military base killing 14 soldiers, four of them officers.

=== February 16, 2011 ===
- 13 Somali soldiers and 4 civilians killed

13 government soldiers and four civilians were killed and 25 civilians were wounded in street fighting in Mogadishu.

=== February 20, 2011 ===
- 53 civilians killed

53 people were killed and 81 wounded, most of them civilians, in street fighting in Mogadishu.

=== February 22, 2011 ===
- 16 Somali soldiers, 12 civilians and 8 insurgents killed

16 government soldiers, 12 civilians and 8 insurgents were killed in street fighting in Mogadishu.

=== February 23, 2011 ===
- 70 Somali soldiers, 60 insurgents killed

70 government soldiers and 60 insurgents were killed in street fighting in Mogadishu.

=== February 25, 2011 ===
- 10 Ugandan soldiers and 88 civilians killed

Rebels attacked the Presidential palace in Mogadishu in a large-scale attack that left 10 Ugandan AU soldiers and 88 civilians dead.

=== February 26, 2011 ===
- 69 civilians and 25 insurgents killed

69 civilians were killed and over 100 wounded in a rebel artillery attack on the town of Balet Hawo. Also, 25 insurgents were killed and over 30 wounded when government troops took control of the rebel-held town of Wardhumadle.

== March ==
=== March 5, 2011 ===
- 50–120 Somali soldiers killed

Soldiers of the Transitional Government and AMISOM reportedly captured the border town of Bulo Hawo from al-Shabaab after two years of rebel occupation. Casualties from al-Shabaab were reportedly in the "dozens" and the combined TFG/AMISOM forces reportedly lost about 50 soldiers in the battle; Ethiopian troops also are said to have taken part in the offensive. It was also reported that the combined UN/Government forces now control seven of Mogadishu's sixteen districts, with three currently contested with militia forces.

In Mogadishu, two suicide car bombers attacked two government military bases in Mogadishu. There were reports that up to 70 government soldiers were killed and 160 wounded in the attacks, but the government denied this.

=== March 8, 2011 ===
- 10 civilians killed

10 civilians were killed in clashes between government forces and insurgents in Mogadishu.

=== March 9, 2011 ===
- 5 Somali soldiers killed

Five government soldiers were killed and four wounded when a bomb exploded near the Kuliyada military base in Mogadishu.

=== March 10, 2011 ===
- 51 civilians and 20 TFG militiamen or insurgents killed

51 people were killed in street fighting in Mogadishu. Also, 20 combatants were killed in fighting between a pro-government militia and insurgents in villages in the Galgaduud region of central Somalia. At least 28 civilians were also wounded in the fighting.

=== March 12, 2011 ===
- 44 TFG militiamen, insurgents and civilians killed

44 people were killed infighting in Diif between a pro-government militia and insurgents.

=== March 13, 2011 ===
- 23 Somali soldiers and insurgents killed

23 government soldiers and insurgents, but mostly insurgents, were killed in fighting in Beledweyne.

=== March 14, 2011 ===
- 62 Somali soldiers and unknown number of insurgents killed

62 government soldiers and an unknown number of insurgents were killed in street fighting in Mogadishu.

=== March 16, 2011 ===
- 13 Somali soldiers and 9 civilians killed

13 government soldiers and nine civilians were killed in street fighting in Mogadishu.

=== March 17, 2011 ===
- 9 Somali and 6 AU soldiers and 7 civilians killed

Six AU soldiers and seven civilians were killed in street fighting in Mogadishu. At the same time the insurgents claimed they killed nine government soldiers in missile attacks on their bases.

=== March 18, 2011 ===
- 29 TFG militiamen and 9 civilians killed

Inter-factional fighting between pro-government militiamen in Luuq left 29 militiamen and nine civilians dead.

=== March 20, 2011 ===
- 35 insurgents, 28 civilians and 3 Somali soldiers killed

42 people, including 35 insurgents and four civilians, were killed in street fighting in the town of Dhobley.

Also, 24 people were killed and 27 wounded in AU shelling of rebel-held districts of Mogadishu.

=== March 23, 2011 ===
- 50 civilians and 11 Somali soldiers killed

61 people, including 11 government soldiers, were killed in street fighting in Mogadishu.

=== March 25, 2011 ===
- 12 civilians killed

12 civilians were killed in street fighting in Mogadishu.

=== March 28, 2011 ===
- 58 Somali soldiers, 51 insurgents and 43 civilians killed

152 people, including: 58 government soldiers, 51 insurgents and 43 civilians, were killed in street fighting in Mogadishu.

== April ==
=== April 1, 2011 ===
- 21 insurgents and 17 Somali soldiers killed

21 insurgents and 17 government soldiers were killed in street fighting in Mogadishu.

=== April 3, 2011 ===
- 77 Somali soldiers, 57 civilians and 44 insurgents killed

178 people, including: 77 government soldiers, 57 civilians and 44 insurgents, were killed in fighting for the towns of Dhobley and Liboi. At the end of the day, government troops took control of the towns from insurgent forces.

=== April 8, 2011 ===
- 45 insurgents, 9 civilians and 6 AU soldiers killed

45 insurgents, 9 civilians and 6 AU soldiers were killed in street fighting and shelling in Mogadishu.

=== April 9, 2011 ===
- 15 government soldiers and 13 civilians killed

15 Somali soldiers and 13 civilians were killed in street fighting in the town of Baladweyn.

=== April 27, 2011 – Ongoing ===
- 46 government soldiers, 35 TFG militiamen, 165 insurgents and 27 civilians killed

== June ==
=== June 20, 2011 ===
- 3 killed and 10 wounded in a gun battle between joint TFG-ASJW forces against extremist al-Shabab Islamist group in Southern Somalia's Gedo region. The extremist group suffered heavy losses.

=== June 23, 2011 ===
- A US drone fires a missile at two senior al-Shabaab members driving in a convoy. The two people were injured. This is the first US drone attack inside Somalia.

== October ==
=== October 4, 2011 ===
- A bomb on a lorry kills more than 70 people in Mogadishu near a compound containing government buildings.

=== October 10, 2011 ===
- AU troops claim to have driven al-Shabab fighters from their last stronghold in Mogadishu.

=== October 11, 2011 ===
- The SOS Children hospital on Mogadishu closes after being hit by shells. The attack killed one staff member.

=== October 16, 2011 ===
- A coordinated incursion in southern Somalia between Kenyan troops and the Somali army begins as a response to alleged kidnappings of foreigners by al-Shabaab militants in Kenya.

=== October 18, 2011 ===
- A car bomb kills at least two people in Mogadishu.

=== October 21, 2011 ===
- Al-Shabab fighters present the bodies of at least 70 people who they claim are African Union peacekeepers from Burundi. However the African Union said that they only lost ten soldiers and two were missing.

=== October 23, 2011 ===
- African Union announced that it had advanced towards the outskirts of Mogadishu

=== October 24, 2011 ===
- A fighter jet bombed the town of Kismayo, an al-Shabab stronghold. The origin of the jet could not be determined, and al-Shabab said that the attack has caused no casualties.

=== October 28, 2011 ===
- A Kenyan supply convoy traveling 60 km inside Somali territory in the direction of Kismayo comes under attack from al-Shabaab fighters. The fight lasts for 30 minutes. According to the Kenyan military nine al-Shabab fighters are killed and two Kenyan soldiers wounded. Al-Shabab denies those figures and claims 20 Kenyan soldiers were killed.

=== October 29, 2011 ===
- The US confirms that it operates MQ-9 Reaper drones from an Ethiopian air base near Arba Minch to conduct missions over Somalia.
- Al-Shabaab fighters dressed as AU soldiers try to storm the AMISOM base in Mogadishu. In the resulting gun fight, at least 10 people are killed.

== November ==
=== November 19, 2011 ===
- According to witnesses Ethiopian troops with at least 20 vehicles cross into Somalia near Guri'el and Beledweyne. The Ethiopian government however denied the incursion.

=== November 24, 2011 ===
- 10 Al Shabaab killed, 8+ wounded.

On Thursday morning Kenyan jets bombed the areas around Wamaitho and Kisima, located in southern Somalia. Kenya claimed the bombing killed 7 Al Shabaab and wounded 8. Kenyan and TFG troops attacked an Al Shabaab training camp in the town of Hawina, where Kenya claimed three Al Shabaab deaths and two AK-47's captured. Several Al Shabaab fighters escaped with injuries. The Kenyan army spokesperson claimed KDF air strikes destroyed 2 Al Shabaab camps.

- 1 Kenyan soldier killed, 4 wounded

Five KDF soldiers were seriously wounded in a bomb attack against 13 KDF riding a military truck. The IED bombing occurred near the Kenyan border town of Mandera. A senior police officer said the attackers opened fire after the bombing. One KDF soldier later died of their wounds.

=== November 25, 2011 ===
- 2–3 civilians killed, 27 injured.

Around 8 pm two grenade attacks occurred in the eastern Kenyan city of Garissa. A grenade was hurled at the Holiday Inn, killing 2, while a blast on Ngamia road killed 1. 15 people received minor injuries while 12 people received serious injuries.

=== November 30, 2011 ===
- 4 government soldiers killed, 12 wounded.

A suicide bomber attacked Villa Baidoa, a government military compound in Mogadishu. The attack narrowly missed General Abdikarim Yusuf, who said the attacker took advantage when the compound guards were changing shifts at the main gate.

- 4 people killed, 39 wounded.

A roadside bomb in Mogadishu's Dharkenley district exploded, killing 4 and injuring 39, according to a local police officer.

== December ==
=== December 6, 2011 ===
- Five people are killed by a suicide attack in the Hodan district in Mogadishu.

=== December 7, 2011 ===
- Al-Shabab fighters attack an AU training camp in Wadajir.

=== December 8, 2011 ===
- Heavy fighting between al-Shabab and AU troops in Mogadishu's Karan and Huriwa district.

=== December 20, 2011 ===
- 9–14 civilians killed.

An unidentified jet bombed the al-Shabab controlled town of Hosungow, located near the Kenyan border. Local residents said 12 to 14 civilians were killed. An al-Shabab spokesperson confirmed that a group of al-Shabab was targeted, but said 9 civilians were killed.

- 1 al-Shabab commander killed, 17 al-Shabab fighters killed.

Kenya said it carried out 2 air raids, claiming more than a dozen al-Shabab deaths. Kenya denied the 2 air raids killed any civilians.

- The first of a 900 strong Djiboutian force arrived in Mogadishu to augment African Union peacekeepers.

== See also ==
- 2009 timeline of the Somali Civil War
- 2010 timeline of the Somali Civil War
- 2012 timeline of the Somali Civil War
- Somali Civil War (2009–present)
