= 2009 timeline of the Somali Civil War =

The 2009 timeline of events in the Somalia War (2006–2009) during January 2009 is set out below. From the beginning of February the timeline of events in the Somali Civil War (2009–present) is set out following the conclusion of the previous phase of the civil war.

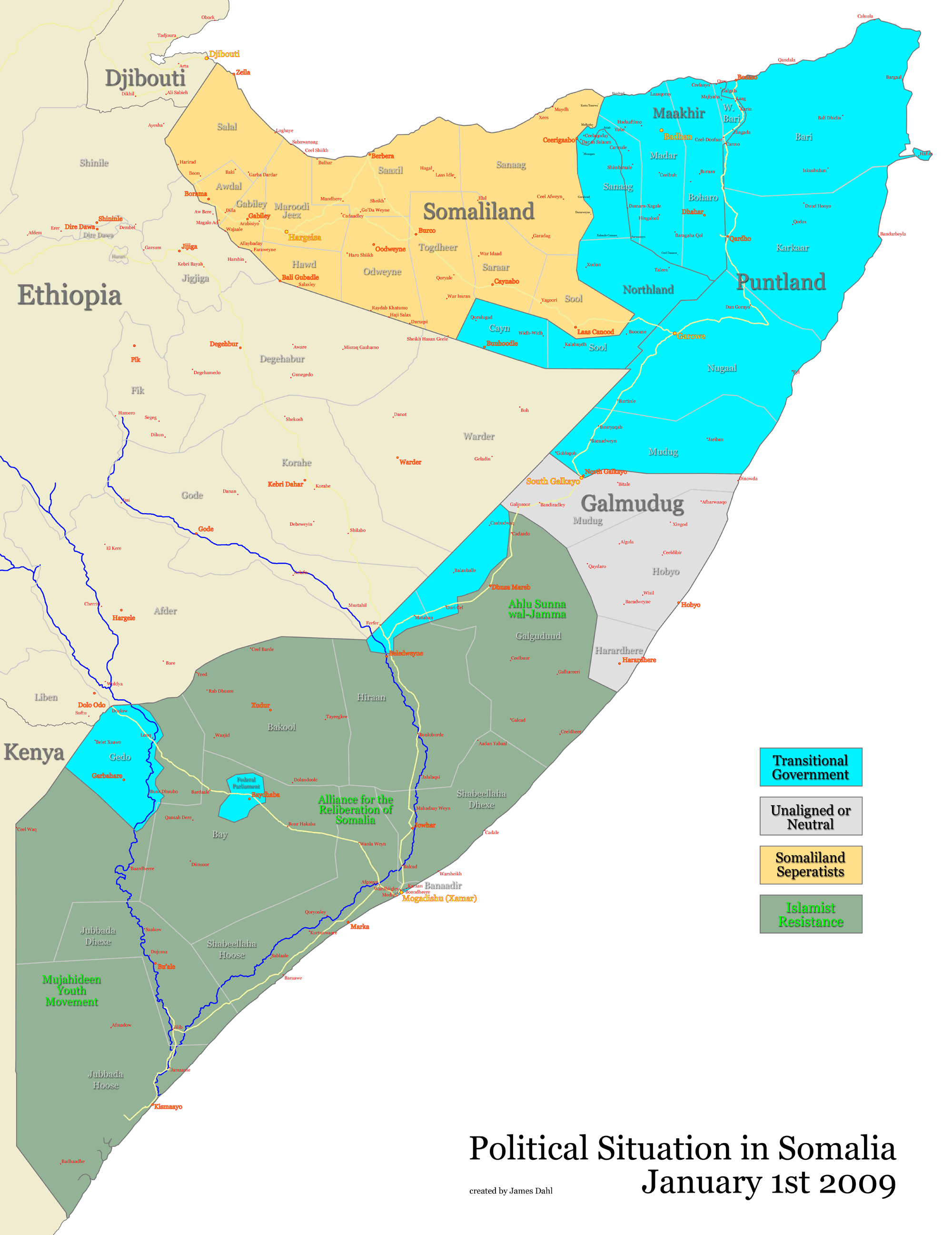
Situation in Somalia on January 1, 2009

== Casualties ==
Fatality reports – (A minimum – based on news reports published in this timeline)
Month	Ethiopian soldiers	Somali soldiers*	Other soldiers**	Pro-government Islamists	Insurgents	Pirates	Somali civilians	Total
January	14	76	1	1	35	5	462	594
February	None	19	11	3	28	2	177	240
March	None	46	1	19	40	3	59	168
April	6	6	unknown	unknown	26	8	108	158
May	2	18	1	29	113	unknown	233	395
June	unknown	21	1	31	36	unknown	171	260
July	unknown	7	8	6	57	unknown	154	232
August	unknown	unknown	unknown	unknown	unknown	unknown	unknown	unknown
September	unknown	unknown	unknown	unknown	unknown	unknown	unknown	unknown
October	unknown	unknown	unknown	unknown	unknown	unknown	unknown	unknown
November	unknown	unknown	unknown	unknown	unknown	unknown	unknown	unknown
December	unknown	unknown	unknown	unknown	unknown	unknown	unknown	unknown
TOTAL	22	193	21	88	335	18	1,364	2,041
Sources:Garowe Online Shabelle.net Google News UN OCHA Somalia *The number includes policemen, militiamen and intelligence personnel **Other soldiers killed: 8 (Uganda) Ugandan 16 Burundi ***Other civilians killed: 2 (Ethiopia) Ethiopian 1 (France) French

== January ==
=== January 1, 2009 ===
- 9 civilians killed, 1 TFG official killed

In Afgoi District eighteen miles south of Mogadishu, a Somali journalist covering fighting between al-Shabaab members and a moderate Islamist group was shot and killed in the cross-fire of a vicious firefight. No other casualties are known.

A Transitional Federal Government parliamentarian was assassinated in Baidoa as the TFG's care-taker President promised the appointment of a new President soon as attacks increase on TFG and Ethiopian soldiers.

Insurgents attacked and killed eight civilians in an attack on Bakara Market.

=== January 2, 2009 ===
- 2 Ethiopian soldiers, 7 civilians, 2 TFG officials killed

A roadside bomb exploded killing two Ethiopian soldiers hours before Ethiopian troops began to withdraw from the capital of Mogadishu. Soldiers then opened fire into a crowd of civilians killing at least 5.

Four assassinations were carried out in Mogadishu and Baidoa killing two TFG government officials and two civilians, including a powerful Sufi sheik.

=== January 3, 2009 ===
- 3 TFG Sufi militiamen, 2 insurgents, 1 civilian killed

Fighting occurred in northern Somalia in the community of Guri'el 270 miles north of Mogadishu between Sufi militiamen nominally in support of the transitional government under the banner of Ahlu Sanah Waljama'ah against Al Shabaab insurgents that resulted in the deaths of six people mostly on each side except for one civilian that had been shot to death earlier in the day by Ethiopian soldiers.

=== January 4, 2009 ===
- 4 Ethiopian soldiers, 2 Somali soldiers, 3 civilians killed

A roadside bomb on the outskirts of Mogadishu killed four Ethiopian soldiers as they were heading out of the city on a military withdrawal convoy. Elsewhere in Mogadishu three civilians were shot to death by mutinous TFG soldiers who were trying to extort these civilians and soon after the shooting other government soldiers opened fire on the mutinous soldiers resulting in the deaths of two TFG soldiers, not known if they were mutineers or TFG supporters.

=== January 5, 2009 ===
- 1 Ethiopian soldier, 40 civilians killed

40 civilians were confirmed killed in recent fighting in the Galgaduud region.

Also, a brief firefight erupted in Qansah Dheere resulting in the death of one Ethiopian soldier that was assisting the takeover of the town from Al Shabaab militants. Al Shabaab withdrew and there isn't any information on insurgent casualties.

=== January 6, 2009 ===
- 1 Ugandan soldier, 4 Sufi TFG militiamen, 2 insurgents killed, 1 civilian killed

A roadside bomb on the outskirts of Mogadishu struck a Ugandan patrol vehicle killing one Ugandan soldier and injuring another. In south-western Somalia, gunmen shot and killed a World Food Program officer.

In Guriel, fighting between insurgents and government backed moderate militiamen resulted in the deaths of six people, four believed to be militiamen and two thought to be Al Shabaab insurgents.

=== January 7, 2009 ===
- 2 Ethiopian soldiers, 4 Somali soldiers, 3 TFG militiamen, 1 insurgent killed

A roadside bomb exploded in the community of Towflig in the Yagshid district which is north of Mogadishu killing four TFG soldiers and injuring two others.

On the road between Baydao and Diinsoor in the Bay region of South-western Somalia, an al-Shabaab ambush hit a militia driven out of Kismayo in September and Ethiopian troops in support of the militia. This militia is independent of the transitional government and it has recently seized at least two towns in the Bay Region to further the conflict with Ethiopian backing. In this attack insurgents reported heavy enemy casualties, 3 militiamen, 2 Ethiopians seen dead and a fellow insurgent killed in the exchange of fire.

=== January 8, 2009 ===
- 1 Somali soldier, 1 U.N aid worker killed

A Somali national working for the World Food Program was shot and killed in the village of Daynile. His body was placed into a vehicle after he was shot and then dumped on the highway where other aid workers collected it. This is the second U.N official killed in Somalia this week.

Fighting in Mogadishu between government soldiers and Al Shabaab insurgents left one soldier dead and another seriously wounded.

=== January 9, 2009 ===
- 1 Moderate ICU official killed

In the district of Cabud Waaq, an Islamic Court Union official was shot and killed and another seriously injured.

- 5 Somali soldiers, 1 civilian killed

The mayor of Garbaharey town in Gedo region where fighting has been ongoing between al-Shabaab forces and Ethiopians for the last two weeks and resulted in the deaths of 5 bodyguards.

=== January 10, 2009 ===
- 5 Somali pirates killed

A small skiff connected with the ransoming of a Saudi supertanker capsized killing five pirates in the Sea of Aden.

- 4 civilians killed

The town of Balad 45 kilometers east of Mogadishu fell to heavy-armed Islamic Court Union (ICU) forces after an intense firefight with Al Shabaab militants. Four civilians are reported dead and an unknown number, thought to be high, dead on both insurgent sides.

=== January 11, 2009 ===
- 3 Somali soldiers, 3 Ethiopian soldiers, 25 TFG militia, 18 insurgents, 4 civilians killed

The town of Guriel was occupied by Sufi transitional government militiamen early this morning after Al Shabaab fighters left the town thinking Ethiopian troops were coming. At day break, Al Shabaab fighters returned to the town and retook the community from government forces leaving 41 fighters dead in total, 25 suspected TFG fighters and 16 Al Shabaab fighters.

In Mogadishu, three government soldiers were shot and killed in the K4 area of the city in fighting that also left two insurgents dead, the four remaining insurgents who attacked the soldiers grabbed rifles and ammunition from their corpses before other troops arrived on the scene. A rocket-propelled grenade struck an Ethiopian convoy in another part of the city killing three Ethiopian soldiers. Elsewhere 4 civilians were killed in a grenade attack.

=== January 12, 2009 ===
- 2 Ethiopian soldiers, 4 Somali soldiers, 5 insurgents, 11 civilians killed

Islamic insurgents launched mortars onto the Presidential Palace in Mogadishu when Prime Minister Hussein was in the building resulting in a government return of fire into Bakara market that resulted in the deaths of 8 civilians. In total, 2 Somali soldiers and 3 more civilians were killed in the mortar attack on the palace.

Meanwhile, in fighting 12 kilometers north of Bardhere town in southern Somalia 9 fighters, including at least 5 insurgents, were killed. The fighting occurred on Kilaliyow Mountain and Ethiopian and Somali troops were victorious.

=== January 13, 2009 ===
Ethiopian troops started to withdraw from Mogadishu, pulling out of their two main bases in the city overnight, and were heading back into Ethiopia. There were scenes of jubilation among Mogadishu residents as the troops left.

=== January 14, 2009 ===
- 14 civilians killed

Insurgents fired mortars at the presidential palace in Mogadishu to which government forces retaliated with their own mortar fire which killed five civilians. Also, in fighting in the Wardigley district another nine civilians were killed.

=== January 15, 2009 ===
- 11 Somali soldiers, 2 insurgents, 2 civilians killed

Fighting between Al Shabaab forces and a government backed militia in the Lower Shabelle region of KM60 resulted in the deaths of 7 Somali militiamen and 2 Al Shabaab insurgents and the capture of at least 100 militiamen as prisoners. In Bardhere Town SW Somalia, an explosion killed 4 Somali militiamen including a commander and killed 2 civilians and injured two civilians.

=== January 16, 2009 ===
- 1 civilian killed

Abdirahaman Xaji Mohamed known as Wadiiro was executed in Kismayo by Islamic insurgents after being convicted in a kangaroo setting of being against the Al Shabaab government in the Lower Shabelle region. He was then shot and killed by gunmen.

=== January 17, 2009 ===
- 310 civilians killed

310 civilians in two different incidents drowned trying to cross the Sea of Aden to Yemen from Somalia directly linked to the anarchy of President Yusuf's resignation and the resurgent Al Shabaab insurgents and subsequent pull-out of Ethiopian soldiers.

=== January 18, 2009 ===
- 2 civilians killed

Al Shabaab insurgents launched mortar shells at AU peacekeepers in Mogadishu killing 2 civilians and injuring nine other people.

=== January 19, 2009 ===
Islamist insurgents re-capture the town of Bardhere after Ethiopian troops withdraw from the town.

- 2 civilians killed

Islamic fighters attacked government militiamen in Mogadishu at an illegal checkpoint resulting in a heavy fire fight of heavy weapons that claimed the lives of two civilians in the cross-fire. Insurgents took over the checkpoint but withdrew when government forces began arriving.

=== January 20, 2009 ===
- 5 Somali soldiers, 1 insurgent, 6 civilians killed

Two battles occurred in Mogadishu resulting in the capture of a government checkpoint by Islamist insurgents in the Sinay district and the push back by government forces in the Madina district resulting in the deaths of 5 soldiers, 1 insurgent and at least 6 civilians.

=== January 24, 2009 ===
- 1 Somali soldier, 1 insurgent, 21 civilians killed

A suicide car-bomb intended for AU peacekeepers in the capital exploded killing 17 civilians. No AU soldiers were hurt or killed. An ensuing gunfight left another four civilians and one policeman dead.

=== January 25, 2009 ===
Ethiopian troops completely pulled out of Somalia.

=== January 26, 2009 ===
- 4 Somali soldiers killed

Both ARS wings (Asmara and Djibouti) call for an end to fighting in Mogadishu and dialogue over the presence of AU forces in the capital. Islamist forces take Baidoa, the last major city controlled by the Transitional Government. Pro-Government (or rather anti-Islamist) forces remain in control of a corridor of territory along the border with Ethiopia, and most of Gedo and Bakool.

Fighting between victorious Al Shabaab militants and government soldiers in the capture of Baidoa left four government soldiers dead and a number of them taken prisoner by the Al Shabaab Islamists. However, by decree all Somali soldiers that were captured in the battle were released by the Islamists and local clan elders told civilians in Baidoa to continue "life as before".

=== January 27, 2009 ===
- 5 civilians killed

Police and military units connected to TFG politicians personal clans have entered into Baidoa to fight Al Shabaab militants but have turned on each other over clan differences. Explosions and heavy fighting has been heard and at least five civilians have been killed and ten combatants wounded. Al Shabaab is getting a hold of the situation.

=== January 28, 2009 ===
- 10 civilians killed

Fighting between two clans in Central Somalia killed five civilians in each clash. Tribal elders had earlier tried to end hostilities between both sides and it unknown why the fighting began.

=== January 29, 2009 ===
- 1 Sufi TFG militiamen, 3 insurgents killed, 4 civilians killed

Fighting in Central Somalia has left four people dead after government-allied Sufi militiamen took over a community from Al Shabaab forces.

== February ==
=== February 2, 2009 ===
- 39 civilians killed

A roadside bomb was detonated by an AU convoy in the capital of Somalia killing three civilians and injuring a Ugandan AU peacekeeper. Peacekeepers then opened fire onto several buses filled with Somali's killing at least 36 more civilians.

=== February 3, 2009 ===
- 7 civilians killed

Amisom soldiers are being blamed for several deaths in the Mogadishu area after Somali fishermen reported that their boats have been fired on by African Union peacekeepers killing several people in the last few days.

=== February 4, 2009 ===
- 1 civilian killed

Tahlil Ahmed, a journalist for HornAfrik was shot and killed in the capital of Mogadishu.

=== February 5, 2009 ===
- 2 pirates, 2 civilians killed

Two pirates were shot and killed in an ongoing feud between several pirate gangs in Puntland. Puntland authorities quickly arrested the attackers and are holding them for their own protection for fear of retaliation.

Sheik Hussein Khalif was killed in Central Somalia in a targeted slaying by unknown gunmen along with a second civilian. He is the second religious leader in 2009 to be killed.

=== February 8, 2009 ===
- 3 civilians killed

Fighting in Mogadishu between AU peacekeepers and Al Shabaab insurgents resulted in their deaths of three civilians.

=== February 10, 2009 ===
- 4 insurgents, 1 TFG soldier, 3 pro-government militiamen killed

At least three people were killed when Islamist insurgents of al-Shabaab and government soldiers fought near Hudur district in Bakool region, after al-Shabaab launched an offensive to take the region and reached its capital. Residents say the dead were all combatants from the warring sides who were using heavy gunfire. Government forces captured the town from Al Shabaab fighters. Four people were killed after Al Shabaab got involved in between two different tribal groups. Elders have put an end to the fighting in central Somalia.

=== February 12, 2009 ===
- 2 Civilians killed

2 Civilians killed as al-Shabaab launches 11 mortars into the Mogadishu sea port.

=== February 15, 2009 ===
- 3 Civilians killed

Three children were killed in an intentionally set fire in southern Somalia.

=== February 17, 2009 ===
- 1 Civilians killed

One civilian businessman was shot and killed in Bossasso Puntland similarly eerily to attacks on business people in Bakara Market in Mogadishu during the Ethiopian occupation. None of the gunmen were caught.

=== February 20, 2009 ===
- 1 Civilians killed

One civilian was shot in an exchange between insurgents and AU peacekeepers in Mogadishu.

=== February 21, 2009 ===
- 1 TFG soldier, 1 insurgent killed

Fighting in Afgoye town has killed one security guard and an insurgent

=== February 22, 2009 ===
- 2 insurgents, 11 Burundian soldiers killed

Two Al Shabaab insurgents blew themselves up at a Burundian camp for AU peacekeepers in Mogadishu killing 11 Burundian soldiers.

=== February 23, 2009 ===
- 1 TFG soldier, 2 civilians killed

Fighting occurred in Mogadishu killing two civilians and one TFG government soldier. Fighting was between two different government factions.

=== February 24–25, 2009 ===
- 6 Somali soldiers, 15 insurgents, 67 civilians killed

In two days of fighting in Mogadishu, 48 civilians were killed along with at least 15 insurgents and 6 TFG policemen as AU peacekeepers and TFG forces tried to take control of the capital from Al Shabaab and other Islamist forces.

In the Gulf of Aden, a ship carrying Somali refugees sank resulting in the deaths of at least 17 civilians.

In Galgadud region, a water shortage hampered by fighting in the region has killed at least two children as reported by village elders.

=== February 25, 2009 ===
- 10 Somali soldiers, 6 insurgents, 4 civilians killed

In North-western Somalia in the town of Hudor Al Shabaab took over the community from TFG-led forces resulting in the deaths of 10 TFG soldiers, six Al Shabaab insurgents and at least four civilians. This is in addition to the heavy fighting in Mogadishu.

=== February 28, 2009 ===
- 45 civilians killed

A boat with Somali refugees sank in the coastal waters of Yemen leaving 45 people dead.

The Somali transitional government has signed a cease-fire and a truce with a four-party Islamist group called Hizbul Ismal leaving only Al Shabaab and foreign Mujahedeen as the enemies of the Transitional Government. From today, the government of Somalia will be run by Sharia law.

== March ==
=== March 3, 2009 ===
- 1 civilian killed

In Somaliland, an Islamic cleric aged 80 was killed in the capital of the semi-separatist region.

=== March 4, 2009 ===
- 2 civilians, 2 moderate Islamists killed

Fighting in north-eastern province of Puntland resulted in the deaths of two militiamen and two civilians after two different clan militias fought it out in a small village.

=== March 5, 2009 ===
- 1 civilian killed

An Iman in the southern city of Gelkcayo was shot and killed by Al Shabaab gunmen.

=== March 6, 2009 ===
- 5 militiamen, 3 civilians killed

Al Shabaab militants attacked Au peacekeepers in Mogadishu killing 3 civilians.

Fighting near an oil exploration site by foreign workers left five fighters from two different clans dead and resulted in evacuation of site.

=== March 8, 2009 ===
- 8 civilians killed

Cholera outbreak in Middle Shabelle Region. This is on top of three children last month.

=== March 9, 2009 ===
In response to al-Shabaab banning commemorations of the birth of Muhammad, fighting broke about in Bardere between al-Shabaab and Ahlu Sunna Waljama'a. No casualties were reported at the time.

=== March 10, 2009 ===
- 7 Somali policemen, 3 civilians killed

At a checkpoint in the semi-autonomous region of Puntland an explosion at a police checkpoint killed seven Somali police officers and three civilians and injured at least two dozen other people.

=== March 11, 2009 ===
- 4 Somali soldiers killed

A landmine detonated in Mogadishu killing a former Somali parliamentarian and three soldiers.

=== March 13, 2009 ===
- 2 insurgents killed

Burundi soldiers were attacked in the capital of Mogadishu by Al Shabaab insurgents resulting in the death of two fighters and the injuring of eight other people, 7 civilian, and 1 peacekeeper.

=== March 14, 2009 ===
- 3 Somali soldiers, 13 civilians killed

A mass grave was reported found by Al Shabaab militants in Baidoa and they reported that the bodies of 12 Muslim men, several wearing the religious clothing of Imams were found in a mass grave. Al Shabaab quickly blamed Ethiopian soldiers for the massacre.

A roadside bomb in Mogadishu killed three Somali soldiers and a civilian.

=== March 15, 2009 ===
- 12 insurgents, 4 moderate Islamists, 2 civilians killed

A pro-government militia took Wabho town in central Somalia from Al Shabaab militants killing eight insurgents in the fight for the town while losing two fighters and a civilian was killed in the cross fire. Ahlu Sunna Waljamaca fighters are currently heading to the Al Shabaab main base in El Bur. Al Shabaab has recently reinforced its central region forces as its control of Central Somalia is weak and close to collapse.

Ahlu Sunna Waljamaca fighters continued their offensive against Al Shabaab militants in Central Somalia after the capture of Wabho town following that victory with the capture of Dac, a small nomadic village near Wabho town. The fighting in Dac left four Al Shabaab fighters and two moderate Islamists dead.

A bomb exploded in Mogadishu killing a civilian driver and wounding three Somali officials riding in the vehicle.

=== March 17, 2009 ===
- 1 moderate Islamist, 1 civilians killed

Fighting occurred between factions in the Islamic Courts Union in Bedelwyen town in Central Somalia. One Islamist and one civilian were killed in the fighting.

=== March 18, 2009 ===
- 16 TFG soldiers, 1 insurgent killed

Fighting in southwestern Somalia in the town of Radhure left 16 TFG soldiers and one Al Shabaab insurgent dead.

=== March 19, 2009 ===
- 1 Ugandan soldier, 2 moderate Islamists leaders, 1 civilian killed

Ahmed Hussein of the U.N World Food Program was shot and killed in Mogadishu by two young gunmen.

A roadside bomb in Mogadishu killed one AU peacekeeper and wounded two others.

In Balad town, north of Mogadishu it was reported by Reuters that two moderate Islamist leaders were executed by Al Shabaab militants.

=== March 21, 2009 ===
- 7 civilians killed

Seven migrants drowned in the Sea of Aden.

=== March 24, 2009 ===
- 3 civilians killed

A riot occurred in Puntland killing three civilians.

=== March 25, 2009 ===
- 5 TFG soldiers killed

Five soldiers were shot execution style in Mogadishu in a district known for rogue soldiers to steal from civilians and local shops, and set up illegal toll blocks. It is unknown if these five soldiers were sent to dismantle such tolls or were trying to steal from civilians when they were killed.

=== March 26, 2009 ===
- 3 pirates, 5 civilians killed

In Bossasso in Puntland, fighting between two different pirate groups have left three pirates dead and five civilians were seriously injured in the fighting but later succumbed to their injuries.

=== March 27, 2009 ===
- 2 insurgent killed

Fighting in Balad district between Islamic Courts Union and Al Shabaab insurgents left one insurgent dead and another seriously wounded.

=== March 28, 2009 ===
- 1 TFG soldier, 3 insurgents, 1 Ethiopian civilian killed

Infighting between two insurgent groups in Mogadishu on Friday night, Saturday morning, left two insurgents dead and numerous civilians injured.

A bomb exploded in Puntland killing one Ethiopian national and injuring at least three others.

Fighting in northern Mogadishu's Yaaqshiid district left one soldier, one insurgent and five civilians dead.

=== March 30, 2009 ===
- 4 TFG soldiers, 2 pro-government militiamen, 4 insurgents, 3 civilians killed

Infighting between TFG soldiers and pro-government (ICU) militiamen in Mogadishu at the K4 intersection resulted in the deaths of seven people, among them two TFG policemen and two pro-government militiamen.

- 2 TFG soldiers, 4 insurgents killed

In Bay region, government soldiers attacked Al Shabaab militants resulting in a fierce firefight killing two soldiers and four insurgents.

=== March 31, 2009 ===
- 6 TFG soldiers, 3 civilians killed

In a case of mistaken identity, two Somali units opened fire on each other resulting in the deaths of six Somali soldiers and three civilians.

== April ==
=== April 1, 2009 ===
- 1 TFG soldier, 1 civilian killed

A Somali Islamic lawmaker escaped assassination in Mogadishu but a government bodyguard and his civilian driver was shot and killed in the attack by Al Shabaab militants.

=== April 2, 2009 ===
- 1 pirate killed

A foreign navy vessel opened fire on a pirate mothership near Puntland resulting in it sinking and killing one of the pirates on board and injuring at least three others. U.S and European forces state they were not in the area at the time.

=== April 3, 2009 ===
- 1 civilian killed

An attack on a mosque in Central Somalia left one cleric dead and two others injured.

=== April 5, 2009 ===
- 1 insurgent, 1 civilian killed

Insurgents attacked Somali soldiers near the KM4 intersection with mortars. One civilian was killed in the exchange of mortar fire and six hurt. AMISOM soldiers then found an armed insurgent and shot him dead.

- 4 insurgents killed

Fighting occurred in the Lower Jubba town of Jamamne after youths connected to Al Shabaab refused their commander's orders to disarm. In the battle, three youths and one Al Shabaab officer were killed and at least ten other combatants were wounded. Al Shabaab is still reportedly in control of the town.

=== April 7, 2009 ===
- 30 civilians killed

Thirty civilians escaping the Somali war zone were killed when the two boats they were in capsized and sank in the Gulf of Aden. Several dozen Somali refugees made it to shore but eight were killed and an additional 22 missing.

- 16 insurgents, 6 Ethiopian soldiers killed

Somali insurgents including at least one Canadian insurgent crossed into Ethiopia and attacked an Ethiopian military convoy near the town of Guriel. Most of the insurgents escaped across the border but a leading commander of the Somali insurgency against the Somali Transitional Government, a Canadian insurgent and fourteen others were killed by Ethiopian forces. At least 6 Ethiopians were killed in the battle.

- 1 civilian killed

In western Somaliland, fighting between two different factions left one civilian dead and resulted in nearly 200 families fleeing from the violence.

=== April 10, 2009 ===
- 2 civilians killed

Insurgents attacked an AU peacekeeping patrol in Mogadishu and two civilians were killed in the crossfire and six others wounded. No insurgents or AU peacekeepers were thought to be injured or killed in the fighting.

- 3 Aid workers, 1 civilian killed

Hussein Omar Mohamud and two other local aid workers working for a national aid organization were shot and killed in south-western Somalia in Eelbarde town in Bakool region. In the Bay region, al-Shabaab militants shot and killed a Khat trader.

- 2 pirates, 1 French civilian killed

French special forces soldiers launched a raid on a yacht being held by Somali pirates freeing four of five French citizens being held hostage by the pirates. Two pirates were killed and three detained in the operation, and subsequently the fifth French citizen was shot and killed as well. No soldiers were injured or killed in the rescue operation.

=== April 12, 2009 ===
- 3 pirates killed

U.S special forces launched an operation to rescue an American sailor held captive by pirates in the Gulf of Aden. The operation was successful when the hostage was freed, with three pirates being killed and a fourth captured.

=== April 13, 2009 ===
- 1 Somali soldier killed

One soldier was killed and three other people wounded in a roadside bomb in Mogadishu.

- 10 civilians killed

Ten civilians were killed in an Islamic bombardment of the Port of Mogadishu.

=== April 16, 2009 ===
- 2 TFG soldiers, 2 insurgents, 1 civilian killed

In Mogadishu, an Islamic Courts militia commander who was a part of the Transitional government was gunned down along with his son and his civilian driver. His troops carried out a revenge attack taking a check-point from al-Shabaab militants in Mogadishu killing two al-Shabaab fighters.

=== April 20, 2009 ===
- 1 aid worker killed

Omar Sharif a Somali aid worker for Care International was shot and killed in southern Somalia.

=== April 22, 2009 ===
- 3 insurgents, 1 TFG soldier, 6 civilians killed

Fighting in central Somalia left ten people dead including six civilians and four combatants. After the battle pro-government militia were fully in control of the town.

=== April 23, 2009 ===
- 35 civilians killed

Thirty-five Somali refugees were killed when their ship sank in the Gulf of Aden. They were among 113 on the ship and U.N organizations believe the other Somali's made it to Yemeni shores.

=== April 25, 2009 ===
- 8 civilians killed, 1 soldier killed

Eight civilians and one Somali soldier was killed in a mortar attack on the parliament buildings in Mogadishu.

=== April 26, 2009 ===
- 6 civilians killed

Al Shabaab insurgents attacked an AU peacekeeping convoy. No peacekeepers or insurgents were killed but at least six civilians were killed in the crossfire.

- 2 pirates killed

Yemeni coastguard vessels tried to intercept Somali pirates as they attacked a Yemeni oil tanker in the Gulf of Aden. The pirates successfully took the oil tanker but two pirates were killed and three others injured, along with two Yemeni soldiers.

== May ==
=== May 4, 2009 ===
- 3 civilians killed

In the Lower Shabbelle town of Jowhar, three people have been killed by an outbreak of dysentery.

=== May 5, 2009 ===
- 3 Moderate Islamists killed

Three fighters of the Islamic Courts Union were ambushed and killed in Mogadishu by suspected al-Shabaab militants.

=== May 6, 2009 ===
- 1 AU (Burundian) peacekeeper killed

An AU peacekeeper from the Burundian detachment in Mogadishu was killed in an attack in Mogadishu by insurgent forces.

=== May 7, 2009 – May 14, 2009 ===
- 18 Moderate Islamists, 29 insurgents, 139 civilians killed

On 7 May, a new battle for control of Mogadishu started between al-Shabaab and Hizbul Islam against the ICU. Hundreds were killed and injured, tens of thousands displaced. By 13 May, rebel forces gained the upper hand and made large gains taking over most of the capital. 113 civilians, 15 ICU fighters (pro-government) and 19 foreign insurgents were killed in the battle. Fighting on 13 May in Mogadishu left eight civilians dead as government forces took an intersection from al-Shabaab forces. AU forces near the Presidential Palace in Mogadishu assisted government soldiers in the fight by opening up an artillery barrage on markets and hideouts where suspected al-Shabaab militants were hiding in southern Mogadishu. A civilian reported seeing government forces moving ten bodies of masked men, al-Shabaab, and three comrades who had been killed in the fighting on 14 May. Eleven civilians were also reported killed in fighting on 14 May, as al-Shabaab commanders reported running out of ammunition.

=== May 11, 2009 ===
In Central Somalia, al-Shabaab militants took control of the Bula-Barde district in Hiraan, from Islamic Court Union forces, allied with the Somali government in Mogadishu. No fighting was reported with the seizure of this Central district.

=== May 13, 2009 – May 15, 2009 ===
- 6 Somali soldiers, 7 insurgents, 7 civilians killed

On May 13, 2009 Islamic Courts Union forces attacked and overran al-Shabaab forces in the Central Somali town of Mahas. Two insurgents, two Somali soldiers and four civilians were killed in the conflict. On the morning of May 14, 2009 al-Shabaab attempted to retake the village and was turned back from the town by Islamic forces resulting in three insurgents, 1 Somali soldier and three more civilians being killed. On May 15, 2009 al-Shabaab militants from other central communities regrouped and a battle occurred for the third straight day in Mahas village resulting in three Somali soldiers and two al-Shabaab militants dying.

=== May 14, 2009 ===
- 1 insurgent killed

Islamic Court Union forces attacked an al-Shabaab convoy as it headed through Yasoman village in Central Somalia killing one insurgent before the al-Shabaab insurgents withdrew from the village.

=== May 15, 2009 ===
- 5 civilians killed

Fighting in Wabho between al-Shabaab and Ahlu Sunna Waljama'a left five people dead.

=== May 15, 2009 – May 17, 2009 ===
- 45 insurgents, 18 civilians killed

In addition to the three Somali soldiers and two insurgents killed in Mahas on 15 May, another 45 insurgents were claimed by the government to have died over the next 48 hours in fighting across central Somalia. A local rights group stated 18 civilians were also killed, making a total of 172 civilians killed and 528 wounded in the previous two weeks.

=== May 17, 2009 ===
- 3 Moderate Islamists killed

Al-Shabaab took control of the strategic town of Jowhar, north of Mogadishu, from ICU forces after fighting that left three pro-government militiamen dead.

=== May 22, 2009 – May 23, 2009 ===
- 31 civilians, 13 insurgents, 4 Somali soldiers killed

Government forces attacked al-Shabaab militants and Hiz Islam forces in Mogadishu pushing them back. Government forces have surrounded the Bakarra market and taken several blocks from insurgents. Artillery shells fired from insurgents killed three civilians on May 23, 2009.

=== May 24, 2009 ===
- 6 Somali policemen, 1 civilian, 1 insurgent killed

A suicide car bomber detonated his bomb as he attempted to drive an SUV into a Somali military camp. However the vehicle exploded at the entrance when police guards opened fire on the insurgent driving the vehicle.

=== May 26, 2009 ===
- 1 reporter killed

A prominent Somali journalist succumbed to injuries he received earlier in the week. He is the fourth Somali journalist killed this year in fighting.

- 9 civilians killed

Nine civilians were killed in a mortar attack on the Presidential palace

- 5 Islamic militiamen, 5 insurgents killed

Five Islamic Courts Union soldiers and five al-Shabaab insurgents were killed in a major clash near the al-Shabaab captured town of Jowher. Al-Shabaab seized a "war-wagon" from Islamic Court Union forces who appeared to be withdrawing to the capital of Mogadishu, from al-Shabaab's central Somalia territory.

=== May 27, 2009 ===
- 12 civilians, 7 insurgents killed

Al-Shabaab militants in Southern Somalia attacked Hiz Islam forces, allies to al-Shabaab in their fight against the moderate government in Mogadishu. Seven insurgents and twelve civilians were killed in the fighting and it is believed if future clashes occur, Hiz Islam's leader Aweys will join the moderate government of Ahmed as they are more in tune with how Somalia should be run.

=== May 28, 2009 ===
- 2 Ethiopian soldiers, 1 Ethiopian civilian, 4 Somali civilians, 4 insurgents, 2 Somali soldiers killed

The Somali "Security Minister" convoy was attacked in eastern Ethiopia by armed Somali insurgents. Somali and Ethiopian military personnel repelled the attack and the "Security Minister" was not injured. However at least thirteen people were killed in the armed attack on the convoy.

=== May 29, 2009 ===
- 3 civilians killed

Government forces in Mogadishu shot and killed three teenage boys Dharkaynley district in Mogadishu. They claim the dead were members of al-Shabaab resident deny their claim and reported that the boys weren't involved in the war. Also the government forces have refused any attempt to bury their bodies.

=== May 30, 2009 ===
- 1 insurgent commander killed

An insurgent commander, who had recently defected from the Islamic Courts Union was assassinated in south Mogadishu by armed men with pistols. Insurgents and pro-government militias blame each other for the killing.

== June ==
=== June 1, 2009 – June 4, 2009 ===
- 13 government soldiers, 10 insurgents, 19 civilians killed

On June 1, 2009 government forces took a northern district of Mogadishu from insurgents, including a police station. However, a roadside bomb killed four police officers. On June 2, 2009 seven civilians were killed in the cross-fire between insurgents and government forces. Government forces reported on June 3, 2009 that they had seized 16 out of 18 districts in Mogadishu from insurgents however, they then reported that they had seized new locations in northern Mogadishu and southern Mogadishu. Fourteen people died in fighting, six civilians and a number of combatants on Thursday between al-Shabaab forces and pro-government forces.

=== June 5, 2009 ===
- 10 civilians killed

A building collapsed as civilians thought shelter inside killing at least two and resulting in eight other missing, including women and children.

- 20 pro-government militia, 10 insurgents, 6 civilians killed

Al-Shabaab militants captured Wabho town from Sunni-government allied militia resulting in the deaths of thirty-six people, mostly combatants, and a resultant seizure of several heavily armed trucks from pro-government militias. At least twenty militia were killed along with ten insurgents and six civilians.

=== June 6, 2009 ===
- 14 insurgents, 11 pro-government militia, 3 civilians killed

Heavy fighting occurred for a second day in Wabho village. More bodies were collected, mostly of fighters, bringing the death toll to 64 in the two days of fighting.

=== June 13, 2009 ===
- 5 government soldiers killed

5 Government soldiers were killed in clashes with other government forces in Ex-control Afgoi in the south of Mogadishu.

=== June 17, 2009 ===
- 2 government soldiers, 1 insurgent, 22 civilians killed

At least 25 people, including the chief of police of Mogadishu Ali Said, were killed during battles in Mogadishu. 10 civilian casualties were reported when a mortar struck a mosque in the Bakara Market

=== June 18, 2009 ===
- 1 government soldier, 1 insurgent, 33 civilians killed

A suicide bomber struck a hotel and killed 35 in the city of Baladwayne. Those killed included Security Minister Omar Hashi Aden and Somalia's former ambassador to Ethiopia, Abdikarin Farah Laqanyo.

=== June 19, 2009 ===
- 23 civilians killed

Clashes erupted in Mogadishu's northern Kaaraan district. 5 people, including Somali lawmaker Mohamed Hussein Addow were reported dead.

Offshore the Yemeni coast, a boat filled with Somali refugees capsized. In this event, 18 people were killed.

=== June 21, 2009 ===
- 20 civilians killed

Fighting continues in Mogadishu and especially in the Kaaraan district. Hizbul Islam and al-Shabaab militia attacked government-held districts including Kaaraan, Shibis, Abdiaziz and Wardhigley, where the Villa Somalia presidential palace is located. In the newest fighting, 20 people were reported dead and 60 wounded.

=== June 22, 2009 ===
- 12 civilians killed

Fighting continues in Mogadishu's northern Yaaqshiid and Kaaraan districts. In the continuing fighting, another 12 people are reported dead.

=== June 23, 2009 ===
- 10 civilians killed

Unknown gunmen attacked a minibus in the al-Shabaab controlled Jowhar area. Two people were killed and more wounded. In the Middle Shabelle region, clan militias clashed. Eight people were reported dead.

=== June 27, 2009 ===
- 8 civilians killed

ICU forces attacked al-Shabaab forces in the Mahaday district in the Middle Shabelle region. During the fighting eight people were killed.

=== June 28, 2009 ===
- 5 civilians killed

Al-Shabaab attacked the presidential palace with heavy mortars. During this attack five civilians were killed

=== June 29, 2009 ===
ICU forces and al-Shabaab again clashed in the Mahaday district. Gunfire and mortar shelling could be heard all over the El Baraf village.

== July ==
=== July 1–5, 2009 ===
- 3 insurgents, 102 civilians killed

Fighting flared up in Mogadishu on July 1. ICU forces attacked al-Shabaab in an effort to retake the previously lost Karaan district. ICU forces gained some ground in this attack. Fifteen people were reported dead and several more injured.

On July 2, fighting continued in the Karaan area of Mogadishu. Twenty people were reported dead and about fifty injured.

On July 3, fighting in the Karaan and Yaaqshiid districts of Mogadishu left another 15 people dead and 60 wounded. At the end of the day al-Shabaab forces had repelled the ICU forces attack and had gained new grounds in Mogadishu closing in the governments to a mere 2 square kilometres.

On July 4, clashes in Yaaqshiid and Karaan district continued. In this latest round of clashes, 23 people were reported dead and more than 60 injured. The government reported that among the dead were at least three foreign fighters, two of them either from Pakistan or Afghanistan.

On July 5, Somali radio journalist Mohammed Yusuf Nihile was shot in his stomach and succumbed to his wounds in a Mogadishu hospital.

In northern Mogadishu, al-Shabaab forces started shelling the presidential palace. In this shelling, 12 people were reported dead.

In central Somalia, officials of Ahly Sunna Walja'ama claimed they took control of the southern city of Galka'ayo. However, this report could not be verified.

=== July 11, 2009 ===
- 1 TFG soldier, 1 insurgent, 14 civilians killed

Sixteen killed in Mogadishu during an attack by Islamists. Nor Daqli, the commander of Somalia government forces in Mogadishu was killed. One foreign fighter, possibly from Bangladesh, was reported to be among the dead also. Forty people, including many civilians, were injured in the fighting.

=== July 12, 2009 ===
- 3 TFG soldiers, 3 Ugandan soldiers, 40 insurgents killed

Forty fighters from al-Shabaab, three government soldiers and three Ugandan AMISOM soldiers were killed in north Mogadishu during a battle when al-Shabaab tried to attack Villa Somalia, the presidential palace of Somalia. The African Union Mission to Somalia (AMISOM), guarding the palace, became involved in the fighting and was unable to take control of rebel strongholds. AMISOM, however, denied assisting Somali government troops, saying, "...AMISOM pre-empted and tried to do what it should to ensure that the safety of troops and the safety of supply routes are guaranteed... We did a show of force, one to guarantee that the routes are open and two to ensure that the safety of our soldiers is in place. That is what people have misconstrued to mean that we are engaged in active combat." About 150 people were wounded in the fighting, including many women and children. Al-Shabaab spokesman Ali Mohamud Rage said, "The fighting in Mogadishu has entered a new phase ... Now it's between us and the AMISOM. AMISOM was backing up the government directly, but we will keep fighting." One hospital official described the fighting as "...the worst armed clashes in the capital for the last two months."

=== July 20, 2009 ===
4 civilians killed Clashes between Hizbul Islam and government forces were reported in the town of Beledweyn. Hizbul Islam, which is controlling the eastern half of the city, attacked the government forces, which are controlling the western half of the city. In these clashes, 4 people were killed.

=== July 22, 2009 ===
- 3 TFG soldiers, 3 insurgents, 19 civilians killed

Heavy shelling between al-Shabaab and government forces in southern and northern districts in Mogadishu left at least 25 people dead and more than 60 wounded. At least three government soldiers and three al-Shabaab militiamen were reported dead.

=== July 22–23, 2009 ===
- 6 pro-government militiamen, 10 insurgents, 15 civilians killed

In central Somalia, battles between Ahlu Sunna Waljama'a and al-Shabaab started. In the first day of fighting, 13 people were reported dead in the town of Mahas.

On July 23, clashes between Ahlu Sunna Waljama'a and al-Shabaab entered a second day. In this second day, fighting shifted to the town of Wahbo. At the end of the day aid agencies claimed that in the two-day battle 31 people had been killed and many more wounded. Both Ahlu Sunna Waljama'a and al-Shabaab claimed victory. Ahlu Sunna Waljama'a claimed they had killed 40 al-Shabaab fighters while they lost six soldiers themselves. On the other hand, al-Shabaab claimed they had ousted Ahlu Sunna Waljama'a from both towns.

=== July 23, 2009 ===
- 3 Burundian soldiers killed

A mysterious infection (later determined to be leptospirosis) afflicts 21 peacekeepers forces from Burundi. Three of them died while the others were placed in quarantine.

=== July 29, 2009 ===
- 2 Ugandan soldiers killed

The death toll from the epidemic that hit the AMISOM peacekeepers rose to five with the deaths of another two Ugandan soldiers. The number of troops that had fallen ill and were under quarantine had reached 50 Burundian and 17 Ugandan soldiers.

== October ==
=== October 23, 2009 ===
- 20 Somali civilians killed

Mortar attacks in Mogadishu occurred on October 21, 2009 when President of Somalia Sheikh Sharif Ahmed was leaving for Uganda. Insurgents fired mortars at Mogadishu International Airport, and African Union peacekeepers responded with artillery fire. Insurgents heavily shelled the Bakara Market in Mogadishu, killing 20 people and wounding 58. Paramedics evacuated some of the wounded in ambulances, but had few of them. Most of the injured were taken to hospital by civilians in private cars, wheelbarrows, or on foot. The injured were taken to the nearby Danile and Madina hospitals.

== See also ==
- Somalia War (2006–2009)
- 2006 timeline of the War in Somalia
- 2007 timeline of the War in Somalia
- 2008 timeline of the War in Somalia
- Somali Civil War (2009–present)
