= 2010 timeline of the Somali Civil War =

This is a 2010 timeline of events in the Somali Civil War (2009–present).

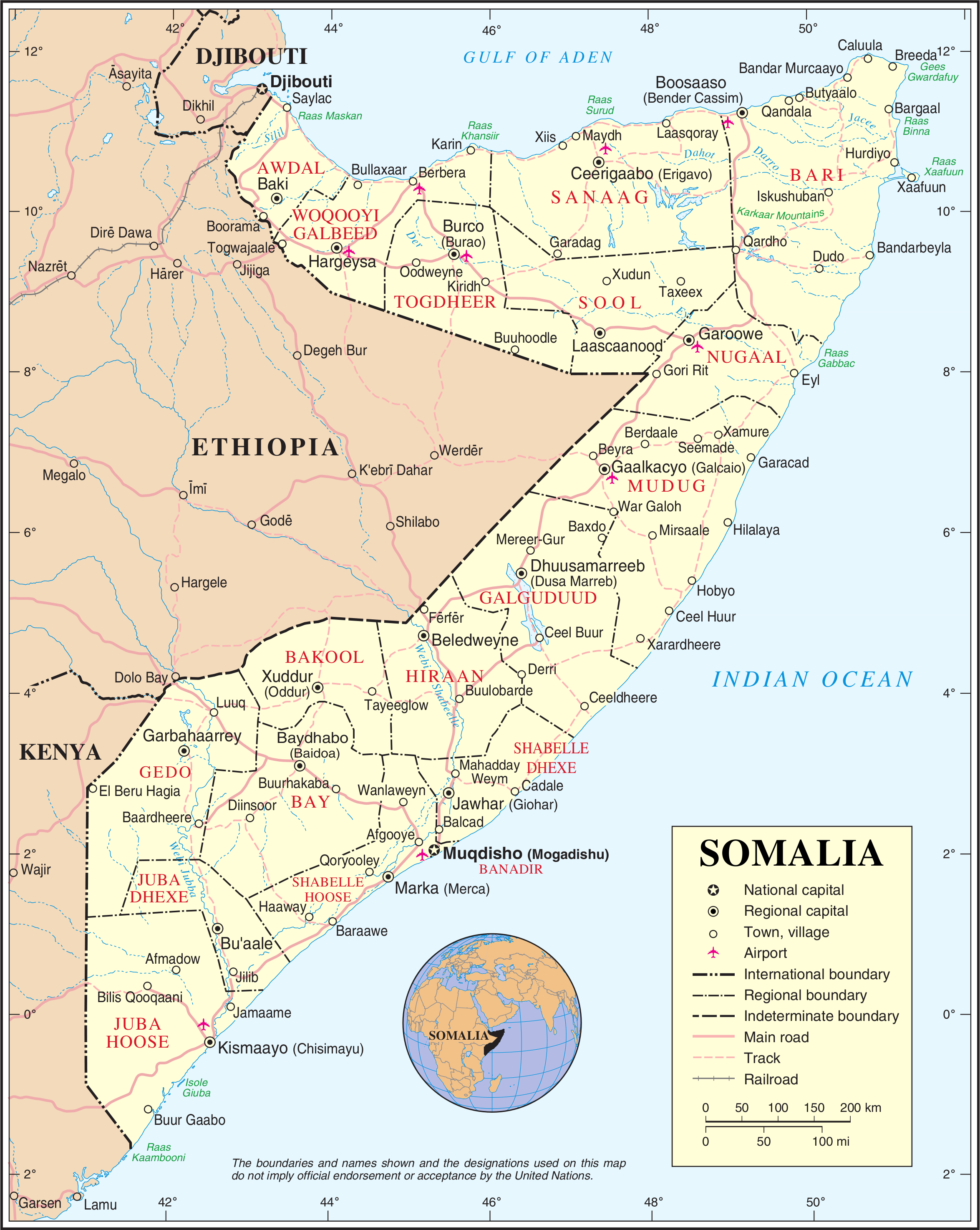
General map of Somalia

== January ==
- January 5
- 3 killed, 13 wounded

Shelling in a Mogadishu Market kills 3.

- January 10–14
- 25 dead, 75 wounded

The Battle of Beledweyne began when Ahlu Sunna Waljama'a forces attacked and captured East Beledweyne which was being held by the Hizbul Islam insurgent group. It became the first battle in months were al-Shabaab and Hizbul Islam groups cooperated against the TFG.

- January 26
- 5 killed, 7 wounded

UPI reports that five are killed, and seven wounded in inter-factional fighting in Hiiraan region in central Somalia, near the town of Beledweyn . A report from Shabelle Radio reports "heavy clashes between the fighters of Ahlu Sunna Waljama'a and the allied fighters of Harakat al-Shabaab erupted near the Somali city at the village of Elgal Monday night." January 27 UPI reports that inter-factional fighting has broken out in Galguduud region between al-Shabaab and Ahlu Sunna Waljama'a militants.

- January 29
- 15 killed, 30 wounded

The Associated Press is reporting that fighting has broken out in Mogadishu between AU troops and Al-Shabaab, calling it the heaviest fighting in the Somali capital in months. The attack takes place shortly before TFG President Sheikh Sharif Ahmed reaches the first year mark in his presidency.

== February ==
- February 8
- 9 killed, 14 wounded

At least nine people have been killed and 14 others wounded in heavy shelling in Somalia's capital, Mogadishu, according to a human rights group. The clashes began late Sunday and continued into Monday morning, said the Elman Peace and Human Rights Organization, a group based in the city.

- February 11
- 30 killed

Islamists attempted to pre-emptively strike the TFG before the beginning of a major TFG offensive. At least 16 civilians are dead due to African Union shelling.

== May ==
- May 1
- 39 killed, 70 injured

UPI reports that 30 people were killed in 2 bomb blasts at mosques in Mogadishu, reportedly targeting "Fuad Mohamed Khalaf, a high-ranking member of the al-Shabab militia". Reports from the BBC and UPI suggest that the dead were mostly worshippers. Later reports indicate that 39 people were killed, and relief agencies suggest that the bombing was caused by inter-factional fighting within al-Shabaab.

- May 10
- 13 dead

The battle was prompted by Ethiopian troops seizing a truck belonging to the Dulbahante, sparking a Dulbahante response and Ethiopian retaliatory attack on Boohuudle and a Somaliland attack upon WidhWidh. 3 Ethiopians and 10 members of the Northern Somali Unionist Movement were killed in battle.

- May 17
- 20 killed, 60 wounded

Twenty people killed, and sixty wounded, mostly civilians caught in the crossfire between TFG forces and Islamist fighters in Mogadishu's "open-air Baraka Market". Shelling had begun the day before, when the parliament of the TFG opened its session.

- May 25
- 15 Killed, 30 wounded

UPI reports that al-Shabaab militants "seized several districts of... Mogadishu" and had begun shelling the Somali presidential palace. UPI suggests that the TFG is "barely functioning" and that prior to the gains by al-Shabaab, only "controlled a section of the coastal city around the presidential seat, the airport and the harbor". The President of Djibouti, speaking in New York, suggested that the TFG may not survive the escalating conflict, with members of the TFG already blaming each other for mistakes in the handling of the conflict. Al-Shebaab released a statement saying ""We have driven out the government from the north of Mogadishu. Now our next step is to capture the palace."

== June ==
- June 3
- 20-28. dead, 55-60 wounded

CNN and the BBC are reporting that another twenty people are dead and another 55 are wounded in continued fighting in Mogadishu between TFG forces and al-Shabaab. According to government officials and General Ahmed Ibrahim, TFG forces advanced further into Islamist territory, taking back several neighbourhoods previously held by al-Shabaab. BBC Africa analyst Richard Hamilton suggested that this could signal a "reversal of fortune" for the TFG.

== August ==
- August 23 - Ongoing
- 2,318+ Civilians killed, 6,024+ wounded

In response to an increase in African Union troops, al-Shabaab mounted an offensive on Mogadishu, beginning on 23 August with an attack on army barracks in several urban districts. The next day, al-Shabaab launched an attack on the Muna Hotel, a hotel in Mogadishu popular with prominent government officials. As of 24 August, at least 30 people were killed in the attack, including 11 Somali MPs.

== October ==
- October 18
- At least 12 dead

In their attempts to curb Al-Shabaab's advance across the region, forces loyal to the TFG attacked the militant-controlled town of Bulo Hawo, lying on the Somalia-Ethiopian border. The government troops were backed by the Sufi alliance Ahlu Sunnah Wal Jama, and together successfully recaptured the city. Initial reports indicate that 11 al-Shabaab fighters and 1 government soldier died in the battle. Continued fighting has also been reported in the city of Beledweyne.

- October 21

On October 21, the African Union appealed to the United Nations for an air and naval blockade of Somalia. The AU Commissioner for Peace and Security Ramtane Lamamra insisted that such an action was necessary to curb the flow of weapons to al-Shabaab and other Islamist militants in the region, and also called for a total of 20,000 AU peacekeepers to be deployed to Somalia, up from the current deployment of 8,000 peacekeepers. Security Council President Ruhakana Rugunda called the requests "legitimate", and Uganda has thrown its support behind the proposal for a larger security force.

== December ==
- December 2

Al Shabaab captured Burhakaba from Hizbul Islam.

== See also ==
- Somali Civil War (2009–present)
