= 2008 United States House of Representatives elections in California =

- November 4, 2008

All 53 California seats to the United States House of Representatives
| | Majority party | Minority party |
|---|---|---|
| Party | Democratic | Republican |
| Last election | 34 | 19 |
| Seats won | 34 | 19 |
| Seat change | Steady | Steady |
| Popular vote | 7,380,825 | 4,515,925 |
| Percentage | 59.90% | 36.65% |
| Swing | ▲3.00% | ▼3.48% |

Democratic hold
Republican hold
Democratic
50–60%
60–70%
70–80%
90–100%
Republican
50–60%
60–70%
70–80%
80–90%
90–100%

The 2008 United States House of Representatives elections in California were held on November 4, 2008, to determine who would represent California various congressional districts in the United States House of Representatives. In the 111th Congress, California has 53 seats in the House, apportioned accordingly after the 2000 United States census. Representatives are elected to two-year terms; those elected will serve in the 111th Congress from January 3, 2009, to January 3, 2011. The election coincides with the United States presidential election as well as other elections in California.

According to CQ Politics, the districts considered the most competitive were the 4th and 11th, with the 3rd, 8th, 26th, 46th and 50th as less than safe as well. However, the partisan balance of the state's congressional delegation did not change, despite the strong Democratic dominance during the broader elections.

== Overview ==
United States House of Representatives elections in California, 2008
| Party | Votes | Percentage | Seats | +/– |
|---|---|---|---|---|
| Democratic | 7,380,825 | 59.90% | 34 | 0 |
| Republican | 4,515,925 | 36.65% | 19 | 0 |
| Libertarian | 220,118 | 1.79% | 0 | 0 |
| Independent | 90,340 | 0.73% | 0 | 0 |
| Green | 60,926 | 0.49% | 0 | 0 |
| Peace and Freedom | 47,659 | 0.39% | 0 | 0 |
| American Independent | 6,286 | 0.05% | 0 | 0 |
| Valid votes | 12,322,079 | 89.66% | — | — |
| Invalid or blank votes | 1,421,098 | 10.34% | — | — |
| Totals | 13,743,177 | 100.00% | 53 | — |
| Voter turnout | 79.42% | | | |

Below are the final official results as reported by the Secretary of State.

== District 1 ==
2008 California's 1st congressional district election
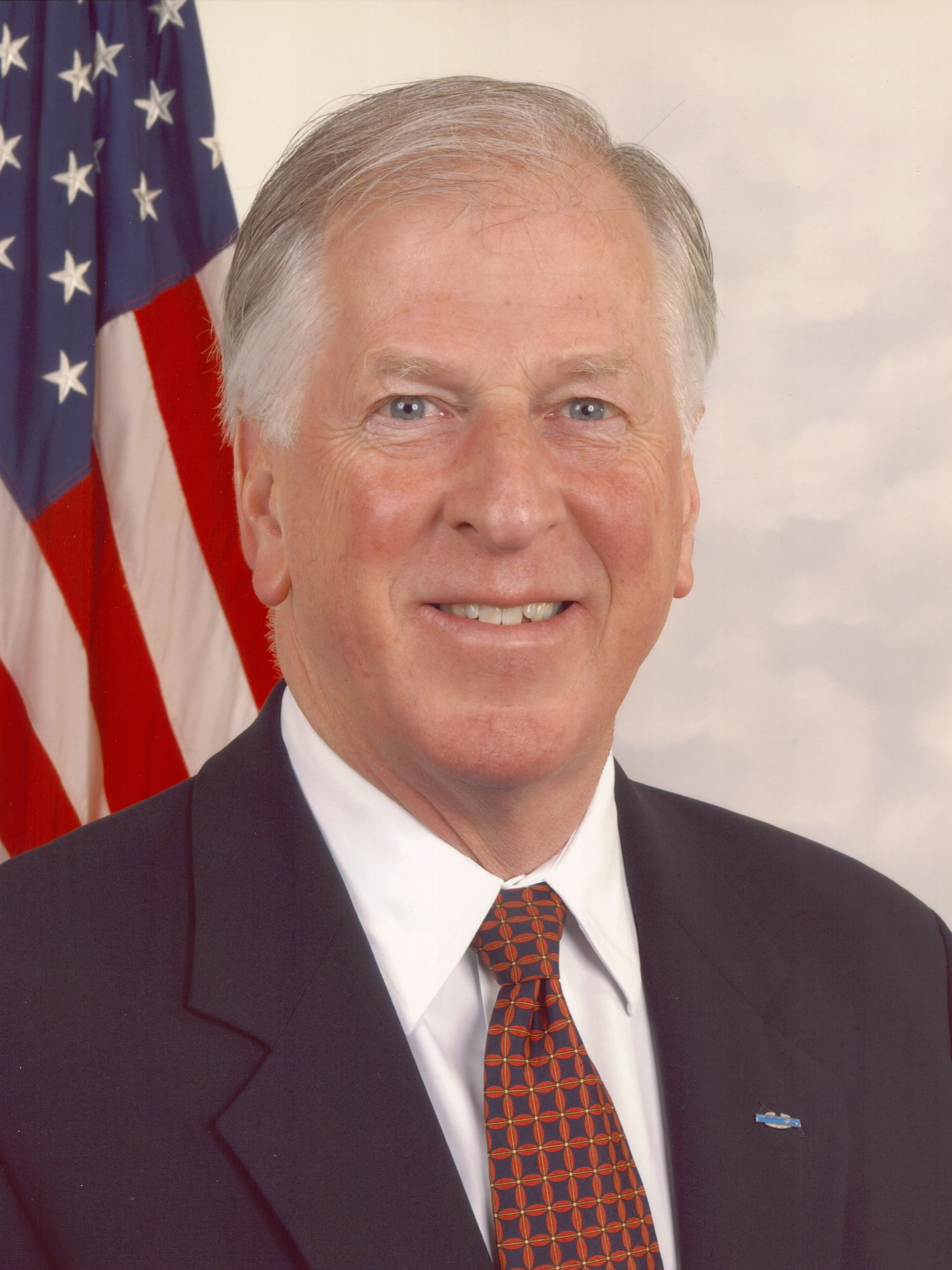

| Nominee | Mike Thompson | Zane Starkewolf | Carol Wolman |
| Party | Democratic | Republican | Green |
| Popular vote | 197,812 | 67,853 | 24,793 |
| Percentage | 68.1% | 23.4% | 8.5% |
- County results Thompson: 50–60% 60–70% 70–80%
U.S. Representative before election
Mike Thompson
Democratic
Elected U.S. Representative
Mike Thompson
Democratic

(map)

- Race ranking and details from CQ Politics
- Campaign contributions from OpenSecrets

=== Predictions ===
| Source | Ranking | As of |
|---|---|---|
| The Cook Political Report | Safe D | November 6, 2008 |
| Rothenberg | Safe D | November 2, 2008 |
| Sabato's Crystal Ball | Safe D | November 6, 2008 |
| Real Clear Politics | Safe D | November 7, 2008 |
| CQ Politics | Safe D | November 6, 2008 |

California's 1st congressional district election, 2008
| Party | Candidate | Votes | % |
|---|---|---|---|
| Democratic | Mike Thompson (incumbent) | 197,812 | 68.10 |
| Republican | Zane Starkewolf | 67,853 | 23.36 |
| Green | Carol Wolman | 24,793 | 8.54 |
| Green | Pamela Elizondo (write-in) | 14 | 0.00 |
| Total votes | | 290,472 | 100.00 |
| Turnout | | | 75.99 |
| Democratic hold | | | |

== District 2 ==
2008 California's 2nd congressional district election
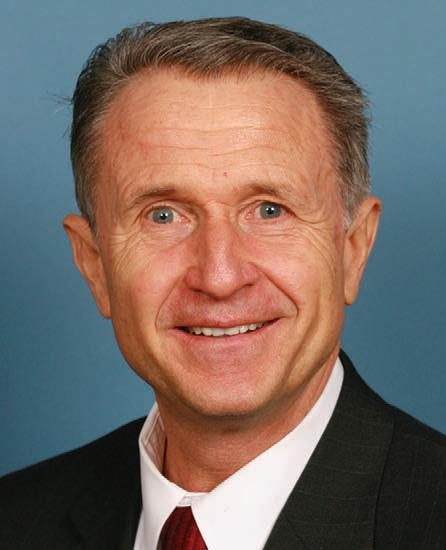

| Nominee | Wally Herger | Jeffrey Morris |
| Party | Republican | Democratic |
| Popular vote | 163,459 | 118,878 |
| Percentage | 57.9% | 42.1% |
- County results Herger: 50–60% 60–70% Morris: 50–60%
U.S. Representative before election
Wally Herger
Republican
Elected U.S. Representative
Wally Herger
Republican

(map)

- Race ranking and details from CQ Politics
- Campaign contributions from OpenSecrets

=== Predictions ===
| Source | Ranking | As of |
|---|---|---|
| The Cook Political Report | Safe R | November 6, 2008 |
| Rothenberg | Safe R | November 2, 2008 |
| Sabato's Crystal Ball | Safe R | November 6, 2008 |
| Real Clear Politics | Safe R | November 7, 2008 |
| CQ Politics | Safe R | November 6, 2008 |

California's 2nd congressional district election, 2008
| Party | Candidate | Votes | % |
|---|---|---|---|
| Republican | Wally Herger (incumbent) | 163,459 | 57.89 |
| Democratic | Jeffrey Morris | 118,878 | 42.11 |
| Total votes | | 282,337 | 100.00 |
| Turnout | | | 76.98 |
| Republican hold | | | |

== District 3 ==
2008 California's 3rd congressional district election
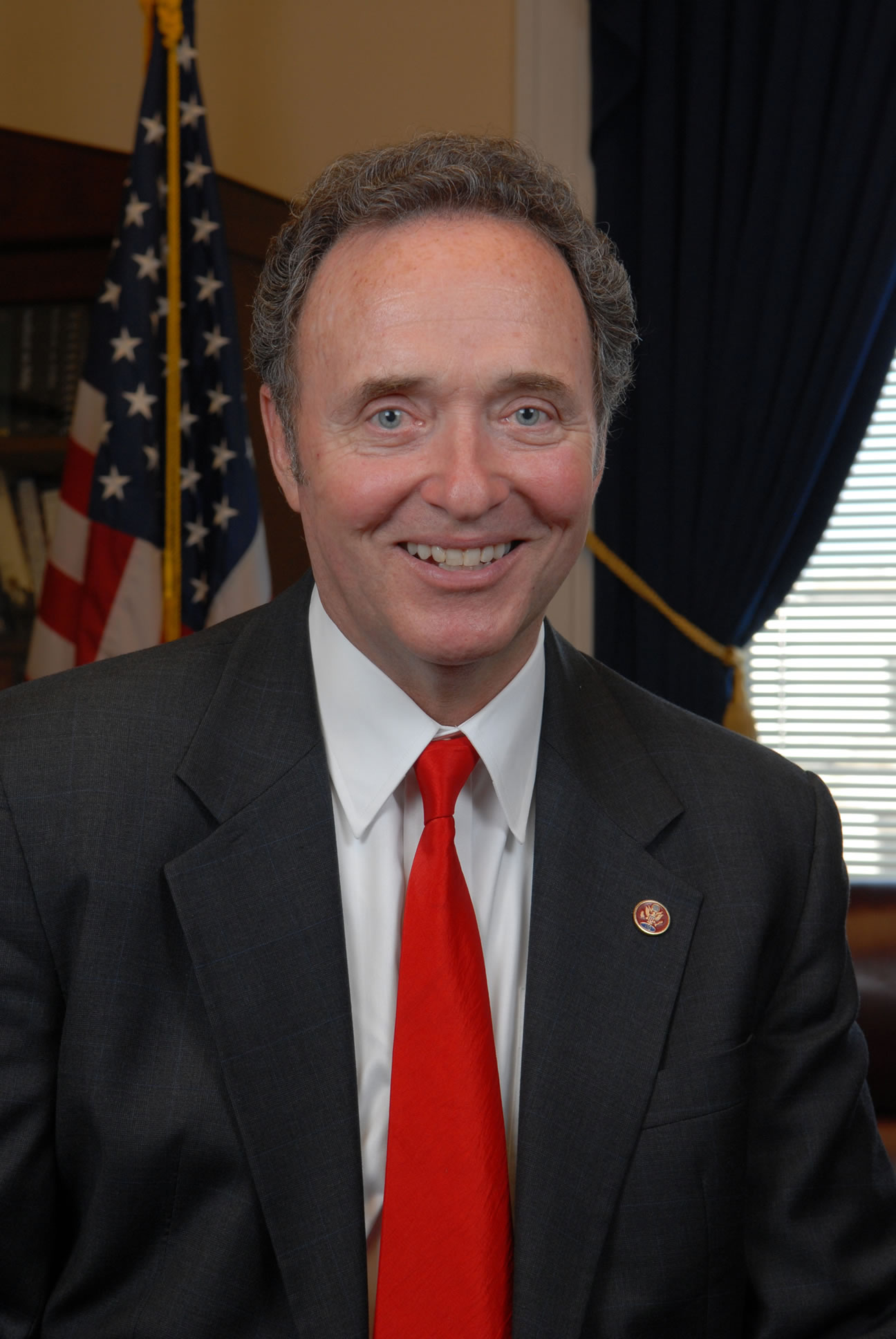

| Nominee | Dan Lungren | Bill Durston |
| Party | Republican | Democratic |
| Popular vote | 155,424 | 137,971 |
| Percentage | 49.5% | 43.9% |
- County results Lungren: 40–50% 50–60% Durston: 50–60%
U.S. Representative before election
Dan Lungren
Republican
Elected U.S. Representative
Dan Lungren
Republican

(map)

- Race ranking and details from CQ Politics
- Campaign contributions from OpenSecrets

=== Predictions ===
| Source | Ranking | As of |
|---|---|---|
| The Cook Political Report | Likely R | November 6, 2008 |
| Rothenberg | Likely R | November 2, 2008 |
| Sabato's Crystal Ball | Safe R | November 6, 2008 |
| Real Clear Politics | Safe R | November 7, 2008 |
| CQ Politics | Likely R | November 6, 2008 |

California's 3rd congressional district election, 2008
| Party | Candidate | Votes | % |
|---|---|---|---|
| Republican | Dan Lungren (incumbent) | 155,424 | 49.49 |
| Democratic | Bill Durston | 137,971 | 43.93 |
| Peace and Freedom | Dina Padilla | 13,378 | 4.26 |
| Libertarian | Douglas Tuma | 7,273 | 2.32 |
| Total votes | | 314,046 | 100.00 |
| Turnout | | | 76.21 |
| Republican hold | | | |

== District 4 ==
2008 California's 4th congressional district election
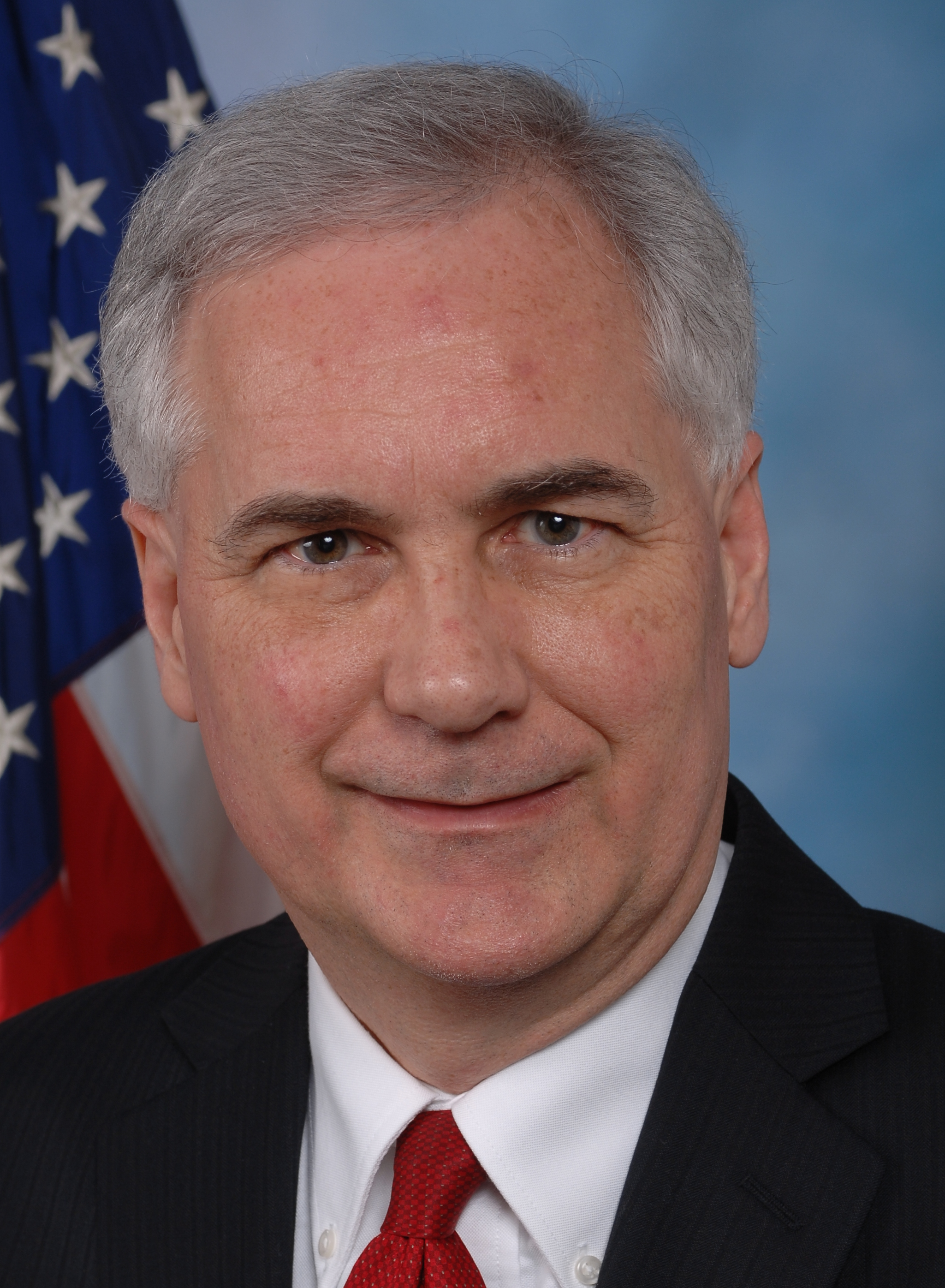

| Nominee | Tom McClintock | Charles Brown |
| Party | Republican | Democratic |
| Popular vote | 185,790 | 183,990 |
| Percentage | 50.2% | 49.8% |
- County results Mcclintock: 50–60% 60–70% Brown: 50–60%
U.S. Representative before election
John Doolittle
Republican
Elected U.S. Representative
Tom McClintock
Republican

(map)

- California’s 4th District (New Rating: No Clear Favorite. Previous Rating: Leans Republican) from CQ Politics
- Campaign contributions from OpenSecrets

On December 2, 2008, Republican Tom McClintock declared victory over Democrat Charlie Brown in the race in the 4th congressional district. Brown conceded his defeat the next day. The race had been so close that it took four weeks of counting all mailed and provisional ballots before McClintock could be assured of victory.

| Pollster | Dates | Respondents | McClintock | Brown | Other | Undecided |
|---|---|---|---|---|---|---|
| Val Smith (R-McClintock) | 10/21-22/08 | 400 likely voters | 49% | 40% | - | - |
| Val Smith (R-McClintock) | 9/22-24/08 | 400 likely voters | 47% | 39% | - | - |
| Benenson Strategy (D-Brown) | 8/21-24/08 | 500 likely voters | 41% | 43% | - | 15% |
| Benenson Strategy (D-Brown) | 5/14-15/08 | 400 likely voters | 40% | 42% | - | 18% |

Charlie Brown is a retired Air Force officer who first ran for this seat in 2006, losing to incumbent John Doolittle by three percent of the vote. Brown announced in February 2007 that he would run again in 2008. Doolittle's prospects for reelection suffered because of a federal investigation into his alleged ties to Jack Abramoff. In April 2007, the FBI raided Doolittle's Virginia home. Doolittle denies all wrongdoing, and has not been charged with any crime. On January 10, 2008, Doolittle announced that he would finish his term but not run for re-election.

On March 4, 2008, State Senator Tom McClintock of Thousand Oaks officially launched his campaign for this district at the Placer County Courthouse in Auburn. McClintock received immediate endorsements from local and state Republicans, including State Senator Sam Aanasted, State Assemblyman Ted Gaines, State Assemblyman Rick Keene, Auburn City Councilman Kevin Hanley, Yuba County Supervisor Dan Logue, and Nevada County Supervisor Sue Horne.

Brown was endorsed by Senator Max Cleland, former General Wesley Clark, former Republican Congressman Pete McCloskey, Senator Jim Webb of Virginia, and many veterans' groups including the Veterans' Alliance for Security and Democracy and VoteVets.org.

In the primary election on June 3, 2008, Tom McClintock won the Republican primary with 54% of the vote ahead of Doug Ose, Suzanne Jones, and Theodore Terbolizard, in that order. Other Republican candidates had withdrawn from the race and thus did not appear on the ballot, including Rico Oller, Eric Egland, and Auburn City Councilman Mike Holmes. Charlie Brown won the Democratic primary with 88% of the vote, ahead of John "Wolf" Wolfgram, who had little financial support.

=== Predictions ===
| Source | Ranking | As of |
|---|---|---|
| The Cook Political Report | Tossup | November 6, 2008 |
| Rothenberg | Tossup | November 2, 2008 |
| Sabato's Crystal Ball | Lean D (flip) | November 6, 2008 |
| Real Clear Politics | Tossup | November 7, 2008 |
| CQ Politics | Tossup | November 6, 2008 |

California's 4th congressional district election, 2008
| Party | Candidate | Votes | % |
|---|---|---|---|
| Republican | Tom McClintock | 185,790 | 50.24 |
| Democratic | Charles Brown | 183,990 | 49.76 |
| Total votes | | 369,780 | 100.00 |
| Turnout | | | 82.07 |
| Republican hold | | | |

== District 5 ==
2008 California's 5th congressional district election
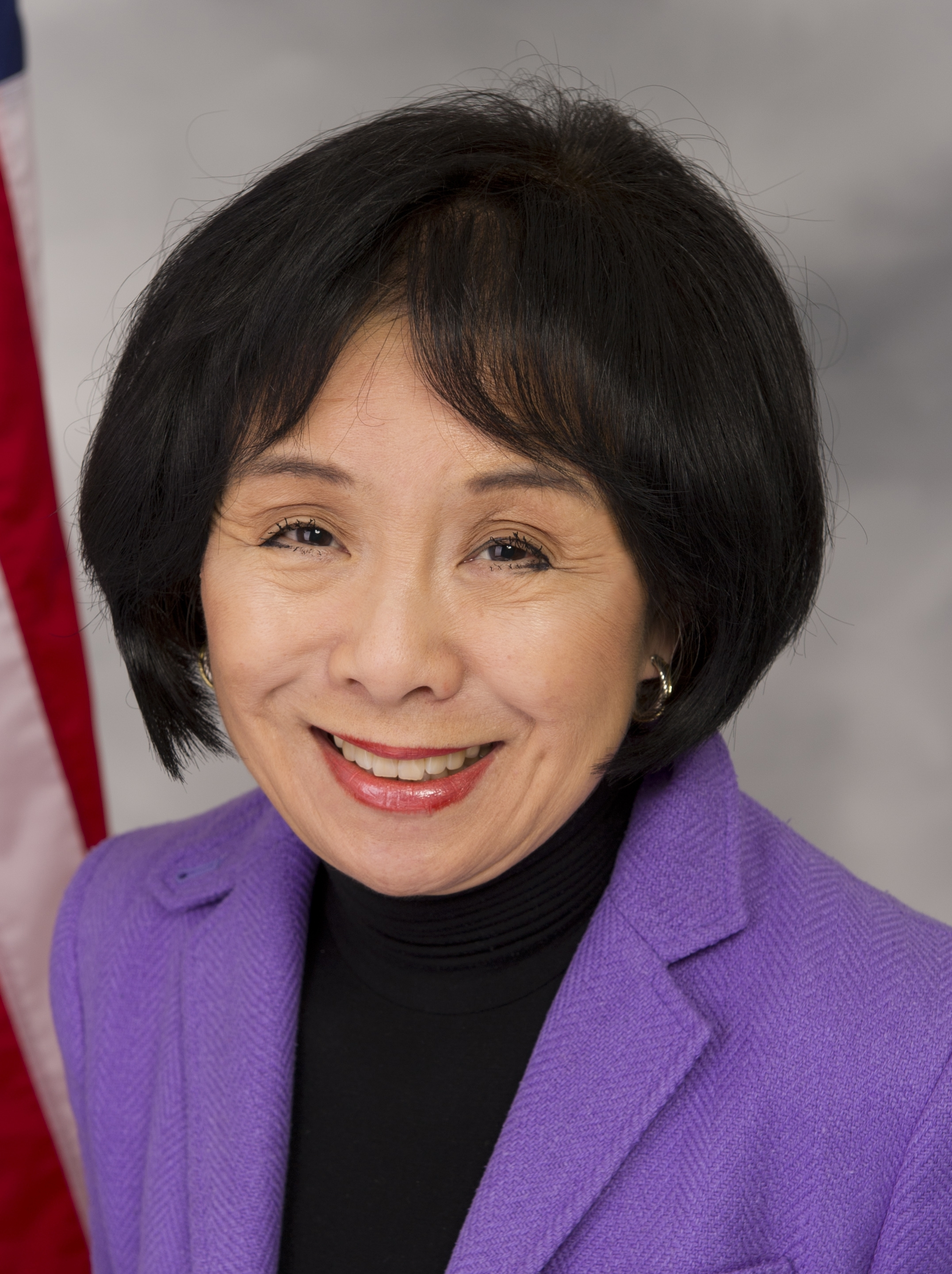

| Nominee | Doris Matsui | Paul Smith |
| Party | Democratic | Republican |
| Popular vote | 164,242 | 46,002 |
| Percentage | 74.3% | 20.8% |
- County results Matsui: 70–80%
U.S. Representative before election
Doris Matsui
Democratic
Elected U.S. Representative
Doris Matsui
Democratic

(map)

- Race ranking and details from CQ Politics
- Campaign contributions from OpenSecrets

=== Predictions ===
| Source | Ranking | As of |
|---|---|---|
| The Cook Political Report | Safe D | November 6, 2008 |
| Rothenberg | Safe D | November 2, 2008 |
| Sabato's Crystal Ball | Safe D | November 6, 2008 |
| Real Clear Politics | Safe D | November 7, 2008 |
| CQ Politics | Safe D | November 6, 2008 |

California's 5th congressional district election, 2008
| Party | Candidate | Votes | % |
|---|---|---|---|
| Democratic | Doris Matsui (incumbent) | 164,242 | 74.27 |
| Republican | Paul Smith | 46,002 | 20.80 |
| Peace and Freedom | Linda Roberts | 10,731 | 4.85 |
| Independent | David Lynch (write-in) | 180 | 0.08 |
| Total votes | | 221,155 | 100.00 |
| Turnout | | | 70.93 |
| Democratic hold | | | |

== District 6 ==
2008 California's 6th congressional district election
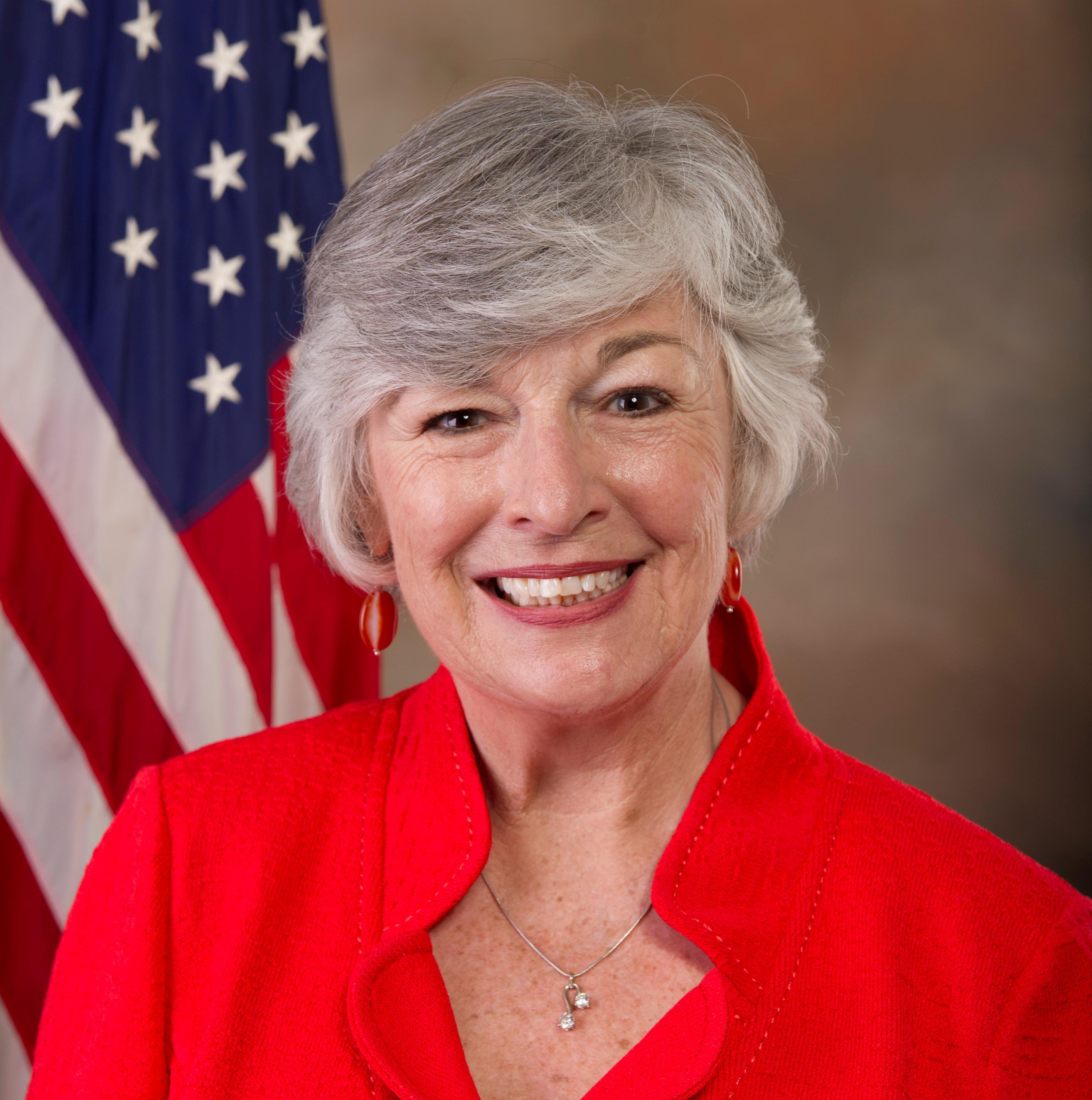

| Nominee | Lynn Woolsey | Mike Halliwell |
| Party | Democratic | Republican |
| Popular vote | 229,672 | 77,073 |
| Percentage | 71.7% | 24.1% |
- County results Woolsey: 70–80%
U.S. Representative before election
Lynn Woolsey
Democratic
Elected U.S. Representative
Lynn Woolsey
Democratic

(map)

- Race ranking and details from CQ Politics
- Campaign contributions from OpenSecrets

=== Predictions ===
| Source | Ranking | As of |
|---|---|---|
| The Cook Political Report | Safe D | November 6, 2008 |
| Rothenberg | Safe D | November 2, 2008 |
| Sabato's Crystal Ball | Safe D | November 6, 2008 |
| Real Clear Politics | Safe D | November 7, 2008 |
| CQ Politics | Safe D | November 6, 2008 |

California's 6th congressional district election, 2008
| Party | Candidate | Votes | % |
|---|---|---|---|
| Democratic | Lynn Woolsey (incumbent) | 229,672 | 71.69 |
| Republican | Mike Halliwell | 77,073 | 24.06 |
| Libertarian | Joel Smolen | 13,617 | 4.25 |
| Total votes | | 320,362 | 100.00 |
| Turnout | | | 87.80 |
| Democratic hold | | | |

== District 7 ==
2008 California's 7th congressional district election
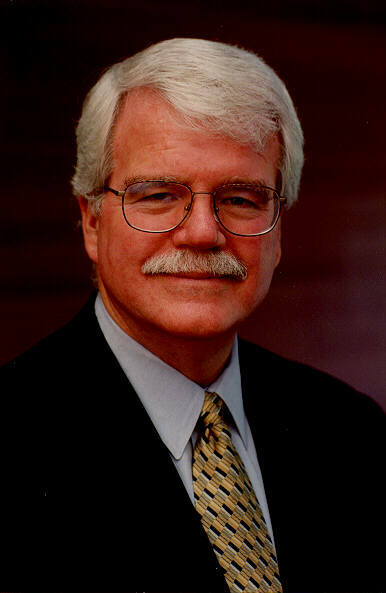

| Nominee | George Miller | Roger Petersen |
| Party | Democratic | Republican |
| Popular vote | 170,962 | 51,166 |
| Percentage | 72.8% | 21.8% |
- County results Miller: 60–70% 70–80%
U.S. Representative before election
George Miller
Democratic
Elected U.S. Representative
George Miller
Democratic

(map)

- Race ranking and details from CQ Politics
- Campaign contributions from OpenSecrets

=== Predictions ===
| Source | Ranking | As of |
|---|---|---|
| The Cook Political Report | Safe D | November 6, 2008 |
| Rothenberg | Safe D | November 2, 2008 |
| Sabato's Crystal Ball | Safe D | November 6, 2008 |
| Real Clear Politics | Safe D | November 7, 2008 |
| CQ Politics | Safe D | November 6, 2008 |

California's 7th congressional district election, 2008
| Party | Candidate | Votes | % |
|---|---|---|---|
| Democratic | George Miller (incumbent) | 170,962 | 72.82 |
| Republican | Roger Petersen | 51,166 | 21.79 |
| Peace and Freedom | William Callison | 6,695 | 2.85 |
| Libertarian | Camden McConnell | 5,950 | 2.53 |
| Total votes | | 234,773 | 100.00 |
| Turnout | | | 79.02 |
| Democratic hold | | | |

== District 8 ==
2008 California's 8th congressional district election
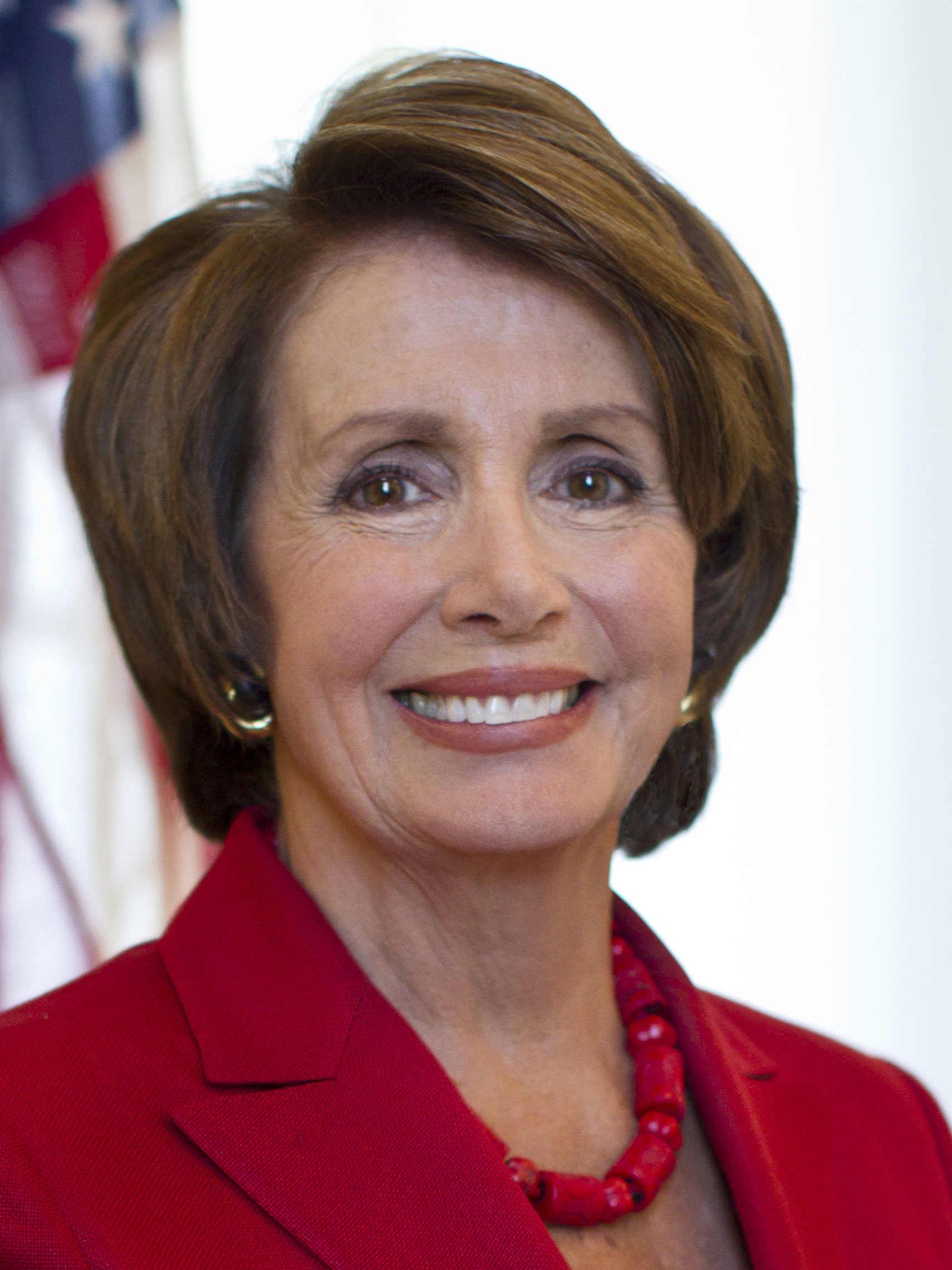

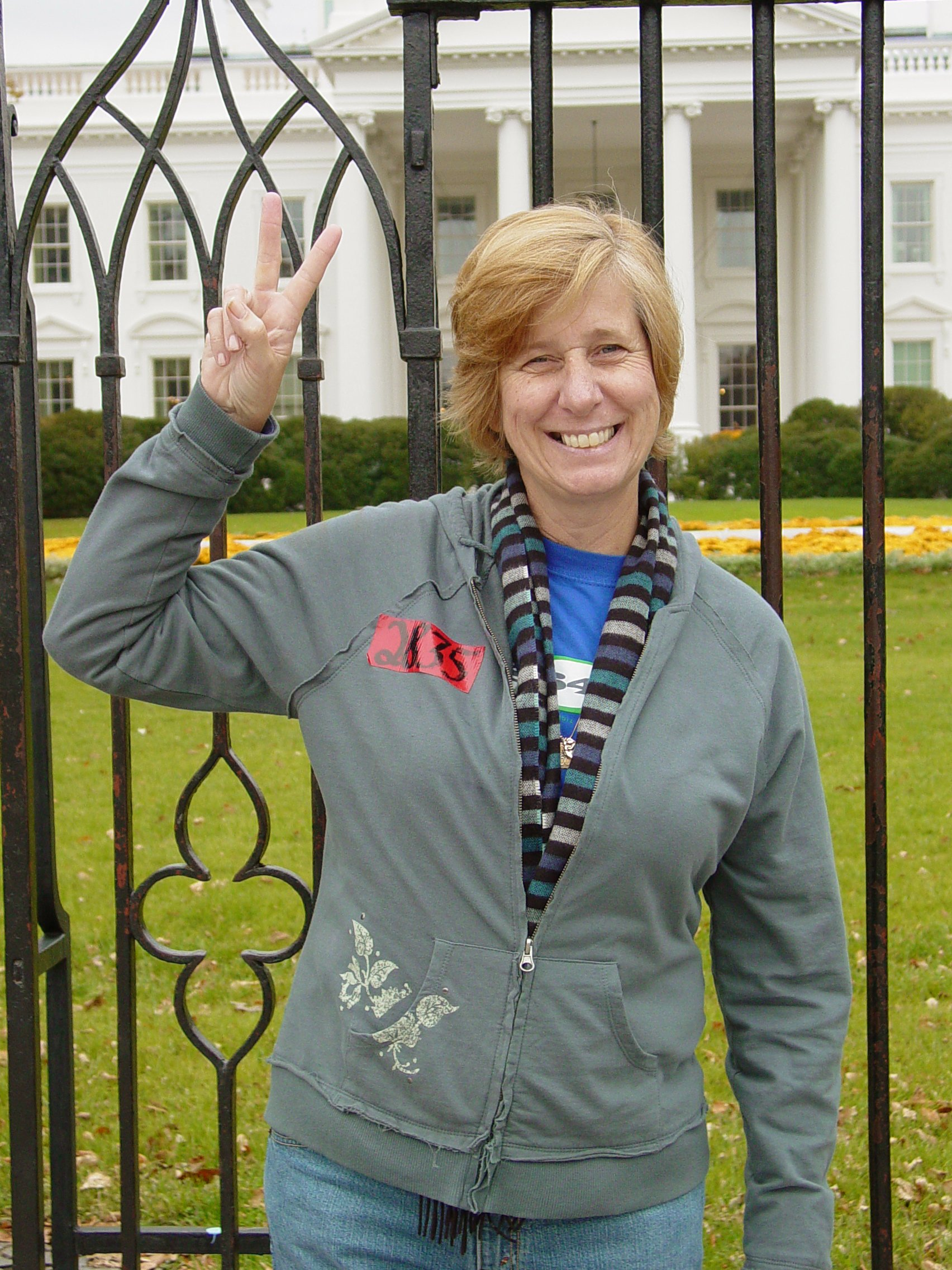

| Nominee | Nancy Pelosi | Cindy Sheehan | Dana Walsh |
| Party | Democratic | Independent | Republican |
| Popular vote | 204,996 | 46,118 | 27,614 |
| Percentage | 71.9% | 16.2% | 9.7% |
- County results Pelosi: 70–80%
U.S. Representative before election
Nancy Pelosi
Democratic
Elected U.S. Representative
Nancy Pelosi
Democratic

(map)

- Race ranking and details from CQ Politics
- Campaign contributions from OpenSecrets

The eighth congressional district has been represented by Democrat Nancy Pelosi since 1993, when the area was redistricted from the 5th congressional district. Pelosi, who is Speaker of the House, is considered safe for re-election, but Iraq War activist Cindy Sheehan announced that she would consider running against Pelosi if Pelosi did not put in an article of impeachment against President George W. Bush and Vice President Dick Cheney. She qualified for the ballot as an independent candidate and was endorsed by the Peace and Freedom Party.

=== Predictions ===
| Source | Ranking | As of |
|---|---|---|
| The Cook Political Report | Safe D | November 6, 2008 |
| Rothenberg | Safe D | November 2, 2008 |
| Sabato's Crystal Ball | Safe D | November 6, 2008 |
| Real Clear Politics | Safe D | November 7, 2008 |
| CQ Politics | Safe D | November 6, 2008 |

California's 8th congressional district election, 2008
| Party | Candidate | Votes | % |
|---|---|---|---|
| Democratic | Nancy Pelosi (incumbent) | 204,996 | 71.87 |
| Independent | Cindy Sheehan | 46,118 | 16.17 |
| Republican | Dana Walsh | 27,614 | 9.68 |
| Libertarian | Philip Berg | 6,504 | 2.28 |
| Independent | Lea Sherman (write-in) | 11 | 0.00 |
| Independent | Michelle Clay (write-in) | 4 | 0.00 |
| Total votes | | 285,247 | 100.00 |
| Turnout | | | 73.15 |
| Democratic hold | | | |

== District 9 ==
2008 California's 9th congressional district election
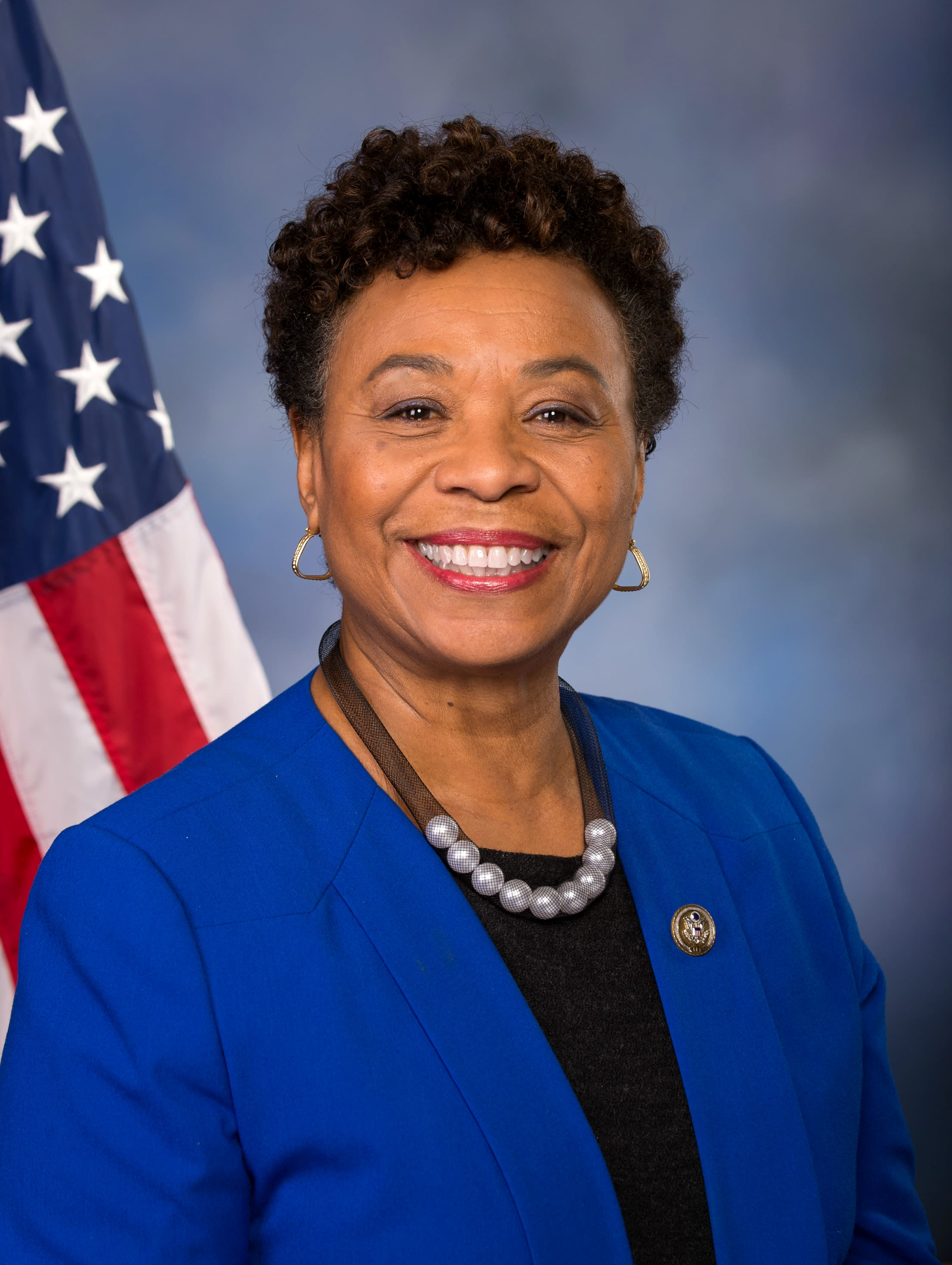

| Nominee | Barbara Lee | Charles Hargrave |
| Party | Democratic | Republican |
| Popular vote | 238,915 | 26,917 |
| Percentage | 86.1% | 9.7% |
- County results Lee: 80–90%
U.S. Representative before election
Barbara Lee
Democratic
Elected U.S. Representative
Barbara Lee
Democratic

(map)

- Race ranking and details from CQ Politics
- Campaign contributions from OpenSecrets

=== Predictions ===
| Source | Ranking | As of |
|---|---|---|
| The Cook Political Report | Safe D | November 6, 2008 |
| Rothenberg | Safe D | November 2, 2008 |
| Sabato's Crystal Ball | Safe D | November 6, 2008 |
| Real Clear Politics | Safe D | November 7, 2008 |
| CQ Politics | Safe D | November 6, 2008 |

California's 9th congressional district election, 2008
| Party | Candidate | Votes | % |
|---|---|---|---|
| Democratic | Barbara Lee (incumbent) | 238,915 | 86.06 |
| Republican | Charles Hargrave | 26,917 | 9.70 |
| Libertarian | James Eyer | 11,704 | 4.22 |
| Green | David Heller (write-in) | 37 | 0.01 |
| Republican | Christopher Kula (write-in) | 27 | 0.01 |
| Total votes | | 277,600 | 100.00 |
| Turnout | | | 72.10 |
| Democratic hold | | | |

== District 10 ==
2008 California's 10th congressional district election
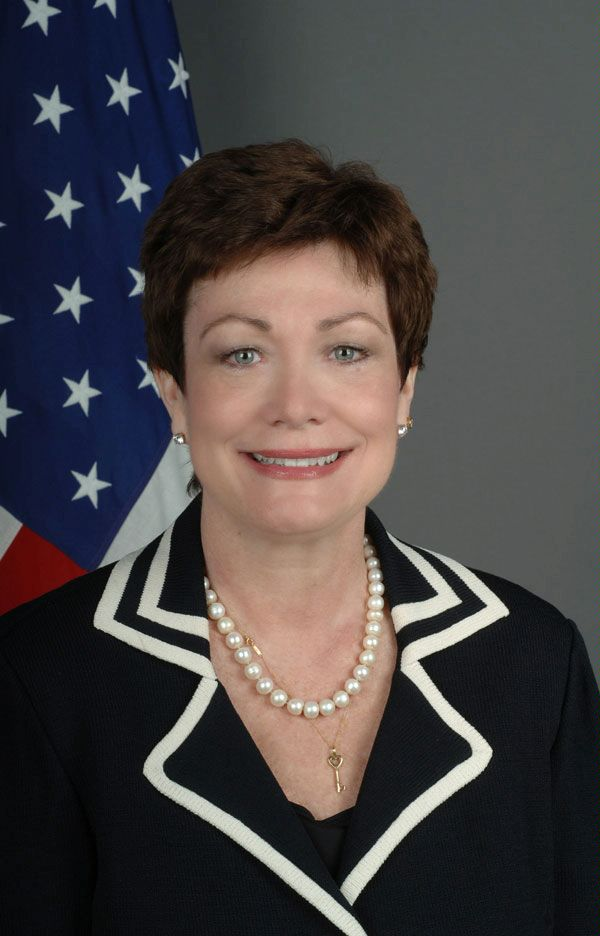

| Nominee | Ellen Tauscher | Nicholas Gerber |
| Party | Democratic | Republican |
| Popular vote | 192,226 | 91,877 |
| Percentage | 65.1% | 31.1% |
- County results Tauscher: 40–50% 50–60% 60–70%
U.S. Representative before election
Ellen Tauscher
Democratic
Elected U.S. Representative
Ellen Tauscher
Democratic

(map)

- Race ranking and details from CQ Politics
- Campaign contributions from OpenSecrets

=== Predictions ===
| Source | Ranking | As of |
|---|---|---|
| The Cook Political Report | Safe D | November 6, 2008 |
| Rothenberg | Safe D | November 2, 2008 |
| Sabato's Crystal Ball | Safe D | November 6, 2008 |
| Real Clear Politics | Safe D | November 7, 2008 |
| CQ Politics | Safe D | November 6, 2008 |

California's 10th congressional district election, 2008
| Party | Candidate | Votes | % |
|---|---|---|---|
| Democratic | Ellen Tauscher (incumbent) | 192,226 | 65.12 |
| Republican | Nicholas Gerber | 91,877 | 31.13 |
| Peace and Freedom | Eugene Ruyle | 11,062 | 3.75 |
| Total votes | | 295,165 | 100.00 |
| Turnout | | | 79.75 |
| Democratic hold | | | |

== District 11 ==
2008 California's 11th congressional district election
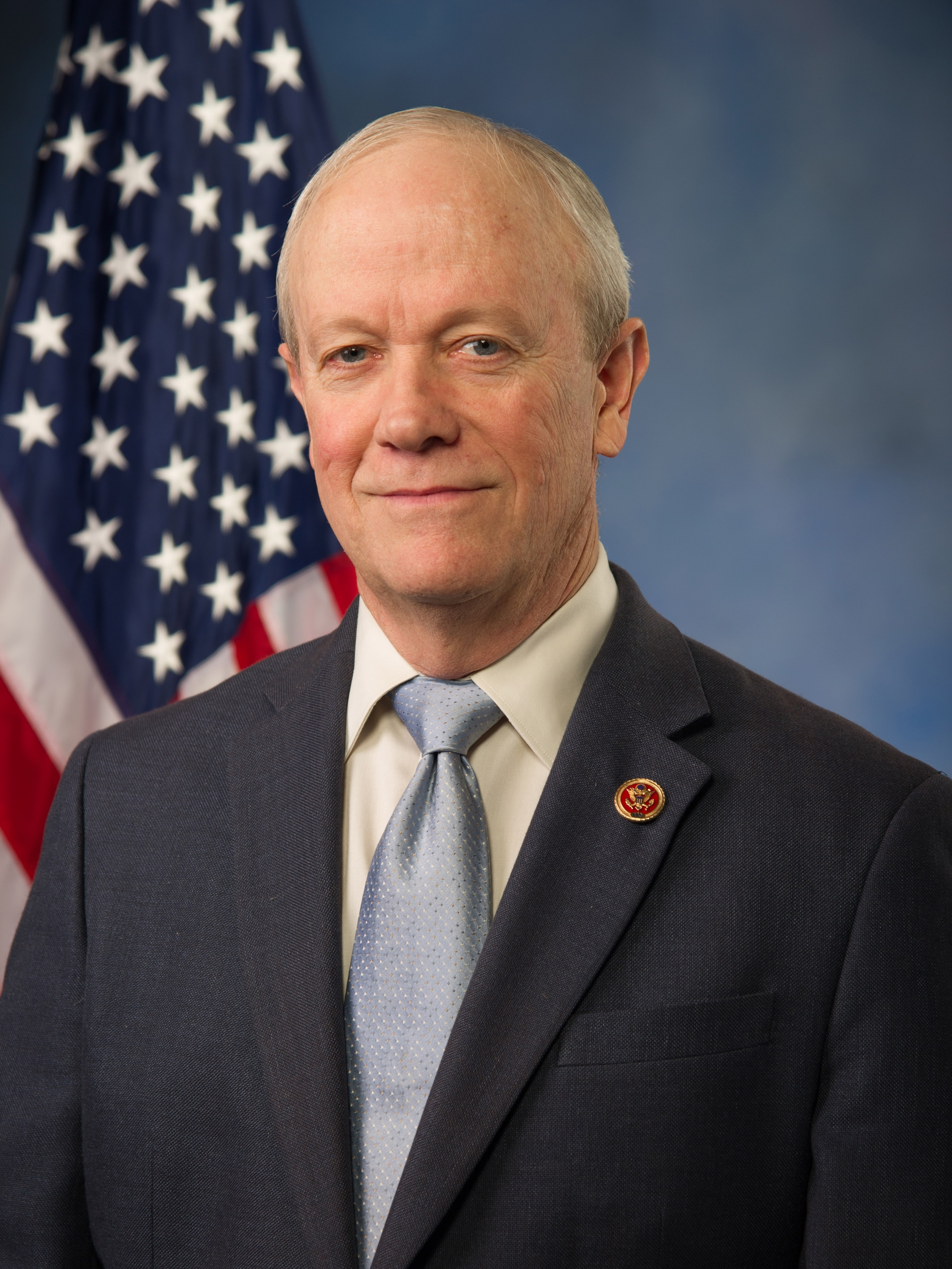

| Nominee | Jerry McNerney | Dean Andal |
| Party | Democratic | Republican |
| Popular vote | 164,500 | 133,104 |
| Percentage | 55.3% | 44.7% |
- County results Mcnerney: 50–60% 60–70%
U.S. Representative before election
Jerry McNerney
Democratic
Elected U.S. Representative
Jerry McNerney
Democratic

(map)

- Race ranking and details from CQ Politics
- Campaign contributions from OpenSecrets

=== Predictions ===
| Source | Ranking | As of |
|---|---|---|
| The Cook Political Report | Lean D | November 6, 2008 |
| Rothenberg | Lean D | November 2, 2008 |
| Sabato's Crystal Ball | Lean D | November 6, 2008 |
| Real Clear Politics | Safe D | November 7, 2008 |
| CQ Politics | Likely D | November 6, 2008 |

California's 11th congressional district election, 2008
| Party | Candidate | Votes | % |
|---|---|---|---|
| Democratic | Jerry McNerney (incumbent) | 164,500 | 55.27 |
| Republican | Dean Andal | 133,104 | 44.72 |
| American Independent | David Christensen (write-in) | 12 | 0.00 |
| Total votes | | 297,616 | 100.00 |
| Turnout | | | 78.53 |
| Democratic hold | | | |

== District 12 ==
2008 California's 12th congressional district election
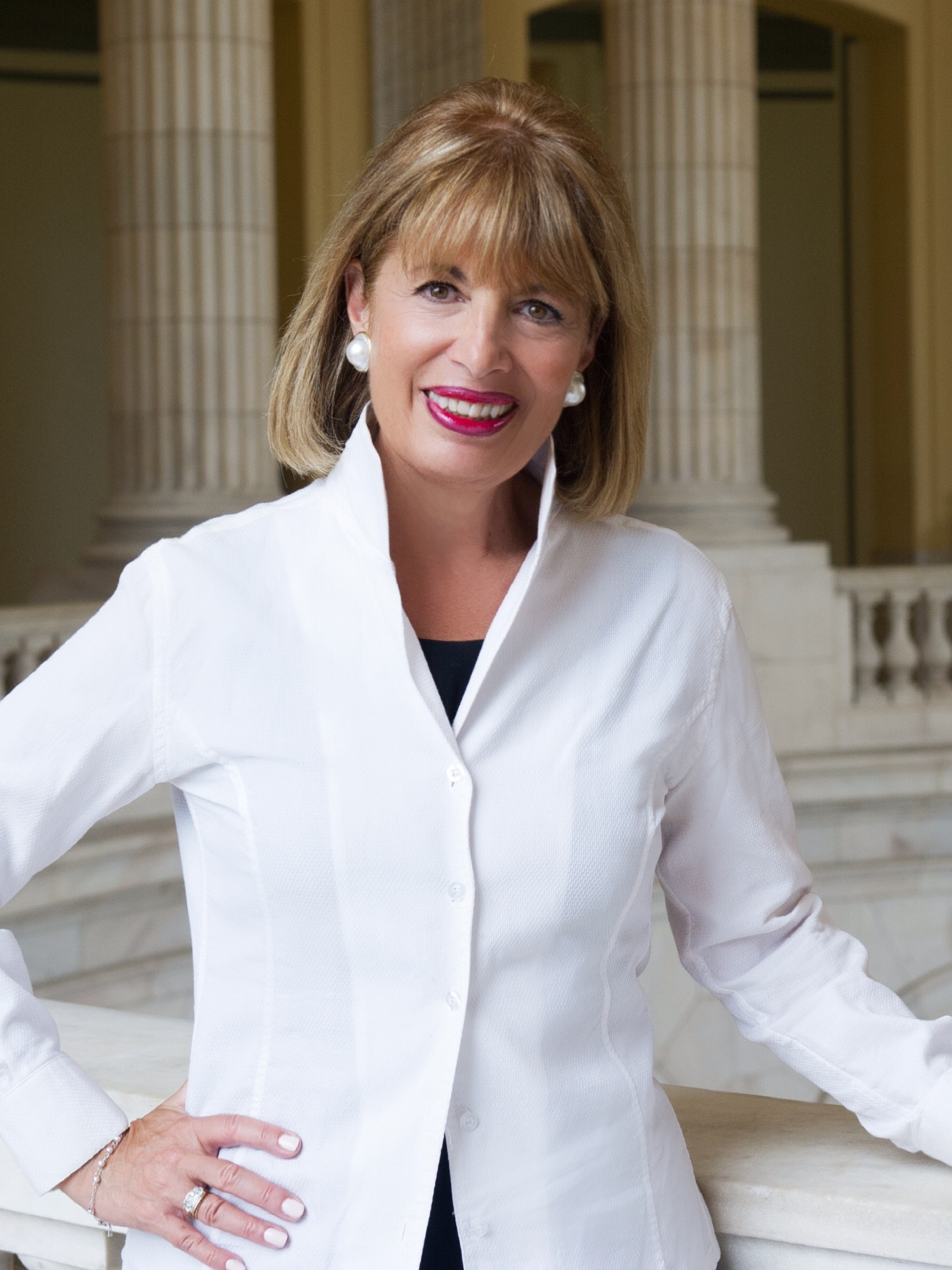

| Nominee | Jackie Speier | Greg Conlon |
| Party | Democratic | Republican |
| Popular vote | 200,442 | 49,258 |
| Percentage | 75.1% | 18.5% |
- County results Speier: 70–80%
U.S. Representative before election
Jackie Speier
Democratic
Elected U.S. Representative
Jackie Speier
Democratic

(map)

- Race ranking and details from CQ Politics
- Campaign contributions from OpenSecrets

California's 12th congressional district is represented by Democrat Jackie Speier. She won a special election months before the general election to replace Tom Lantos, who represented the district from 1981 until his death due to esophageal cancer at the age of 80 in 2008. Lantos had announced that he would not seek re-election due to his declining health. This overwhelmingly Democratic district comprises mainly northern San Mateo County and the Sunset area of San Francisco.

=== Predictions ===
| Source | Ranking | As of |
|---|---|---|
| The Cook Political Report | Safe D | November 6, 2008 |
| Rothenberg | Safe D | November 2, 2008 |
| Sabato's Crystal Ball | Safe D | November 6, 2008 |
| Real Clear Politics | Safe D | November 7, 2008 |
| CQ Politics | Safe D | November 6, 2008 |

California's 12th congressional district election, 2008
| Party | Candidate | Votes | % |
|---|---|---|---|
| Democratic | Jackie Speier (incumbent) | 200,442 | 75.11 |
| Republican | Greg Conlon | 49,258 | 18.46 |
| Peace and Freedom | Nathalie Hrizi | 5,793 | 2.17 |
| Green | Barry Hermanson | 5,776 | 2.16 |
| Libertarian | Kevin Peterson | 5,584 | 2.09 |
| Total votes | | 266,853 | 100.00 |
| Turnout | | | 72.73 |
| Democratic hold | | | |

== District 13 ==
2008 California's 13th congressional district election
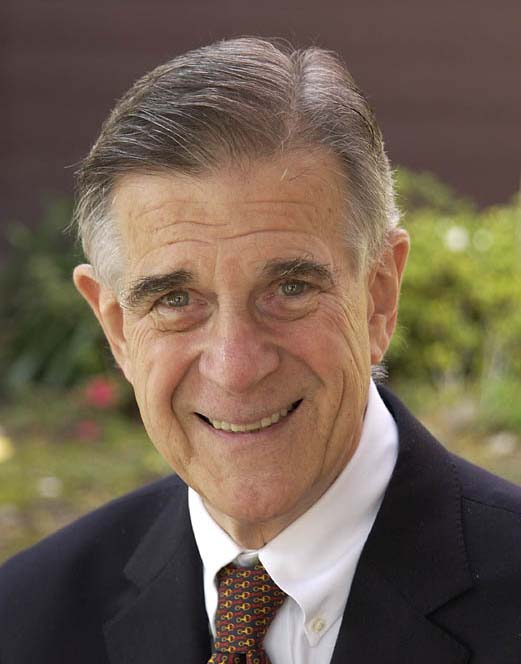

| Nominee | Pete Stark | Raymond Chui |
| Party | Democratic | Republican |
| Popular vote | 166,829 | 51,447 |
| Percentage | 76.4% | 23.6% |
- County results Stark: 70–80%
U.S. Representative before election
Pete Stark
Democratic
Elected U.S. Representative
Pete Stark
Democratic

(map)

- Race ranking and details from CQ Politics
- Campaign contributions from OpenSecrets

California's 13th congressional district has been represented by Democrat Pete Stark since 1973. Often regarded as the most liberal member of Congress (and its only atheist), Stark ran for re-election and was unopposed for the Democratic nomination. His overwhelmingly Democratic district is centered in the East Bay and includes Hayward.

=== Predictions ===
| Source | Ranking | As of |
|---|---|---|
| The Cook Political Report | Safe D | November 6, 2008 |
| Rothenberg | Safe D | November 2, 2008 |
| Sabato's Crystal Ball | Safe D | November 6, 2008 |
| Real Clear Politics | Safe D | November 7, 2008 |
| CQ Politics | Safe D | November 6, 2008 |

California's 13th congressional district election, 2008
| Party | Candidate | Votes | % |
|---|---|---|---|
| Democratic | Pete Stark (incumbent) | 166,829 | 76.43 |
| Republican | Raymond Chui | 51,447 | 23.57 |
| Total votes | | 218,276 | 100.00 |
| Turnout | | | 70.72 |
| Democratic hold | | | |

== District 14 ==
2008 California's 14th congressional district election
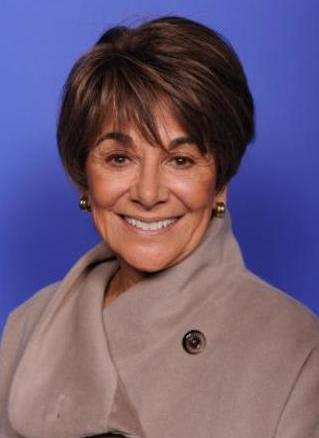

| Nominee | Anna Eshoo | Ronny Santana |
| Party | Democratic | Republican |
| Popular vote | 190,301 | 60,610 |
| Percentage | 69.8% | 22.2% |
- County results Eshoo: 60–70% 70–80%
U.S. Representative before election
Anna Eshoo
Democratic
Elected U.S. Representative
Anna Eshoo
Democratic

(map)

- Race ranking and details from CQ Politics
- Campaign contributions from OpenSecrets

=== Predictions ===
| Source | Ranking | As of |
|---|---|---|
| The Cook Political Report | Safe D | November 6, 2008 |
| Rothenberg | Safe D | November 2, 2008 |
| Sabato's Crystal Ball | Safe D | November 6, 2008 |
| Real Clear Politics | Safe D | November 7, 2008 |
| CQ Politics | Safe D | November 6, 2008 |

California's 14th congressional district election, 2008
| Party | Candidate | Votes | % |
|---|---|---|---|
| Democratic | Anna Eshoo (incumbent) | 190,301 | 69.77 |
| Republican | Ronny Santana | 60,610 | 22.22 |
| Libertarian | Brian Holtz | 11,929 | 4.37 |
| Green | Carol Brouillet | 9,926 | 3.64 |
| Total votes | | 272,766 | 100.00 |
| Turnout | | | 78.46 |
| Democratic hold | | | |

== District 15 ==
2008 California's 15th congressional district election
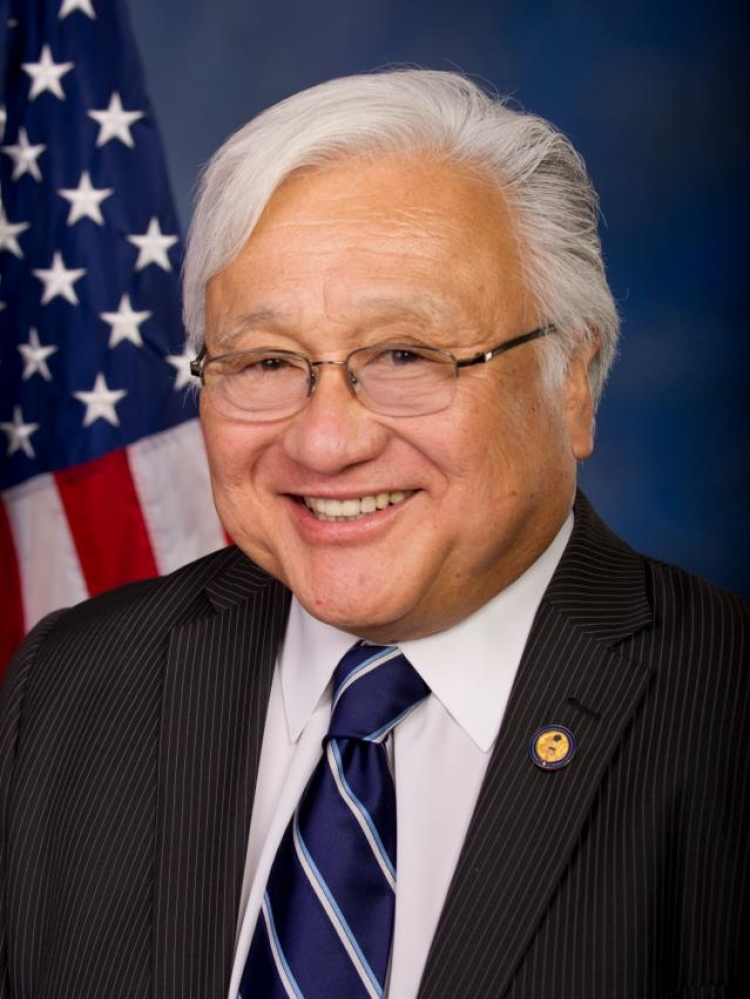

| Nominee | Mike Honda | Joyce Cordi | Peter Myers |
| Party | Democratic | Republican | Green |
| Popular vote | 170,977 | 55,489 | 12,123 |
| Percentage | 71.7% | 23.3% | 5.1% |
- County results Honda: 70–80%
U.S. Representative before election
Mike Honda
Democratic
Elected U.S. Representative
Mike Honda
Democratic

(map)

- Race ranking and details from CQ Politics
- Campaign contributions from OpenSecrets

=== Predictions ===
| Source | Ranking | As of |
|---|---|---|
| The Cook Political Report | Safe D | November 6, 2008 |
| Rothenberg | Safe D | November 2, 2008 |
| Sabato's Crystal Ball | Safe D | November 6, 2008 |
| Real Clear Politics | Safe D | November 7, 2008 |
| CQ Politics | Safe D | November 6, 2008 |

California's 15th congressional district election, 2008
| Party | Candidate | Votes | % |
|---|---|---|---|
| Democratic | Mike Honda (incumbent) | 170,977 | 71.66 |
| Republican | Joyce Cordi | 55,489 | 23.26 |
| Green | Peter Myers | 12,123 | 5.08 |
| Total votes | | 238,589 | 100.00 |
| Turnout | | | 78.78 |
| Democratic hold | | | |

== District 16 ==
2008 California's 16th congressional district election
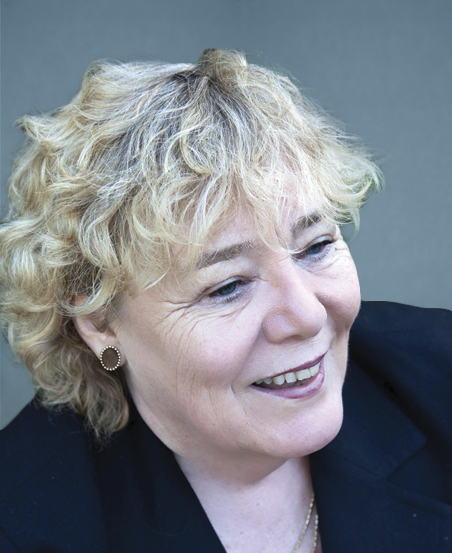

| Nominee | Zoe Lofgren | Charel Winston |
| Party | Democratic | Republican |
| Popular vote | 146,481 | 49,399 |
| Percentage | 71.3% | 24.1% |
- County results Lofgren: 70–80%
U.S. Representative before election
Zoe Lofgren
Democratic
Elected U.S. Representative
Zoe Lofgren
Democratic

(map)

- Race ranking and details from CQ Politics
- Campaign contributions from OpenSecrets

=== Predictions ===
| Source | Ranking | As of |
|---|---|---|
| The Cook Political Report | Safe D | November 6, 2008 |
| Rothenberg | Safe D | November 2, 2008 |
| Sabato's Crystal Ball | Safe D | November 6, 2008 |
| Real Clear Politics | Safe D | November 7, 2008 |
| CQ Politics | Safe D | November 6, 2008 |

California's 16th congressional district election, 2008
| Party | Candidate | Votes | % |
|---|---|---|---|
| Democratic | Zoe Lofgren (incumbent) | 146,481 | 71.34 |
| Republican | Charel Winston | 49,399 | 24.06 |
| Libertarian | Steven Wells | 9,447 | 4.60 |
| Total votes | | 205,327 | 100.00 |
| Turnout | | | 75.75 |
| Democratic hold | | | |

== District 17 ==
2008 California's 17th congressional district election
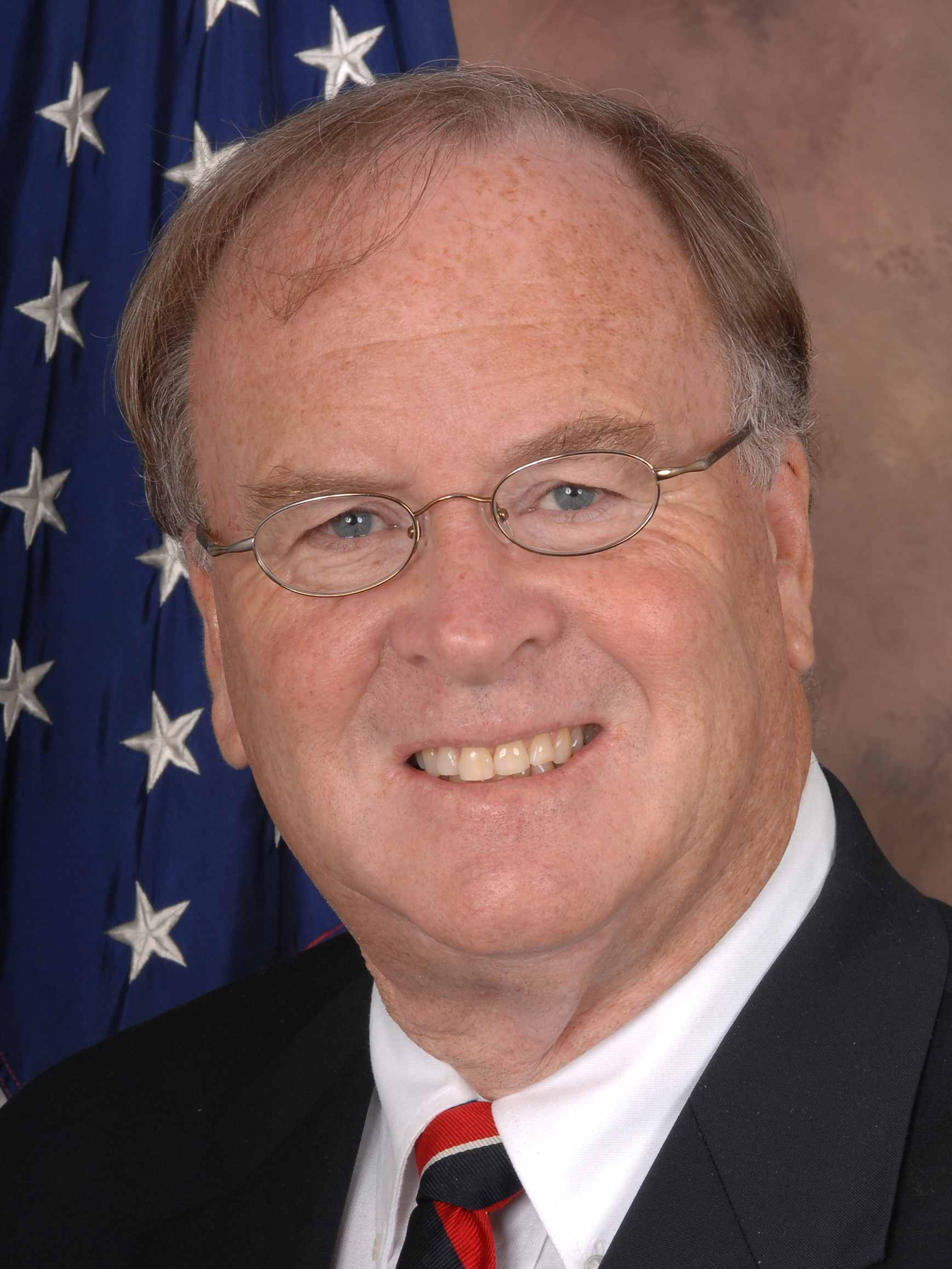

| Nominee | Sam Farr | Jeff Taylor |
| Party | Democratic | Republican |
| Popular vote | 168,907 | 59,037 |
| Percentage | 73.9% | 25.8% |
- County results Farr: 60–70% 80–90%
U.S. Representative before election
Sam Farr
Democratic
Elected U.S. Representative
Sam Farr
Democratic

(map)

- Race ranking and details from CQ Politics
- Campaign contributions from OpenSecrets

=== Predictions ===
| Source | Ranking | As of |
|---|---|---|
| The Cook Political Report | Safe D | November 6, 2008 |
| Rothenberg | Safe D | November 2, 2008 |
| Sabato's Crystal Ball | Safe D | November 6, 2008 |
| Real Clear Politics | Safe D | November 7, 2008 |
| CQ Politics | Safe D | November 6, 2008 |

California's 17th congressional district election, 2008
| Party | Candidate | Votes | % |
|---|---|---|---|
| Democratic | Sam Farr (incumbent) | 168,907 | 73.88 |
| Republican | Jeff Taylor | 59,037 | 25.82 |
| Independent | Peter Andresen (write-in) | 682 | 0.30 |
| Total votes | | 228,626 | 100.00 |
| Turnout | | | 79.72 |
| Democratic hold | | | |

== District 18 ==
2008 California's 18th congressional district election
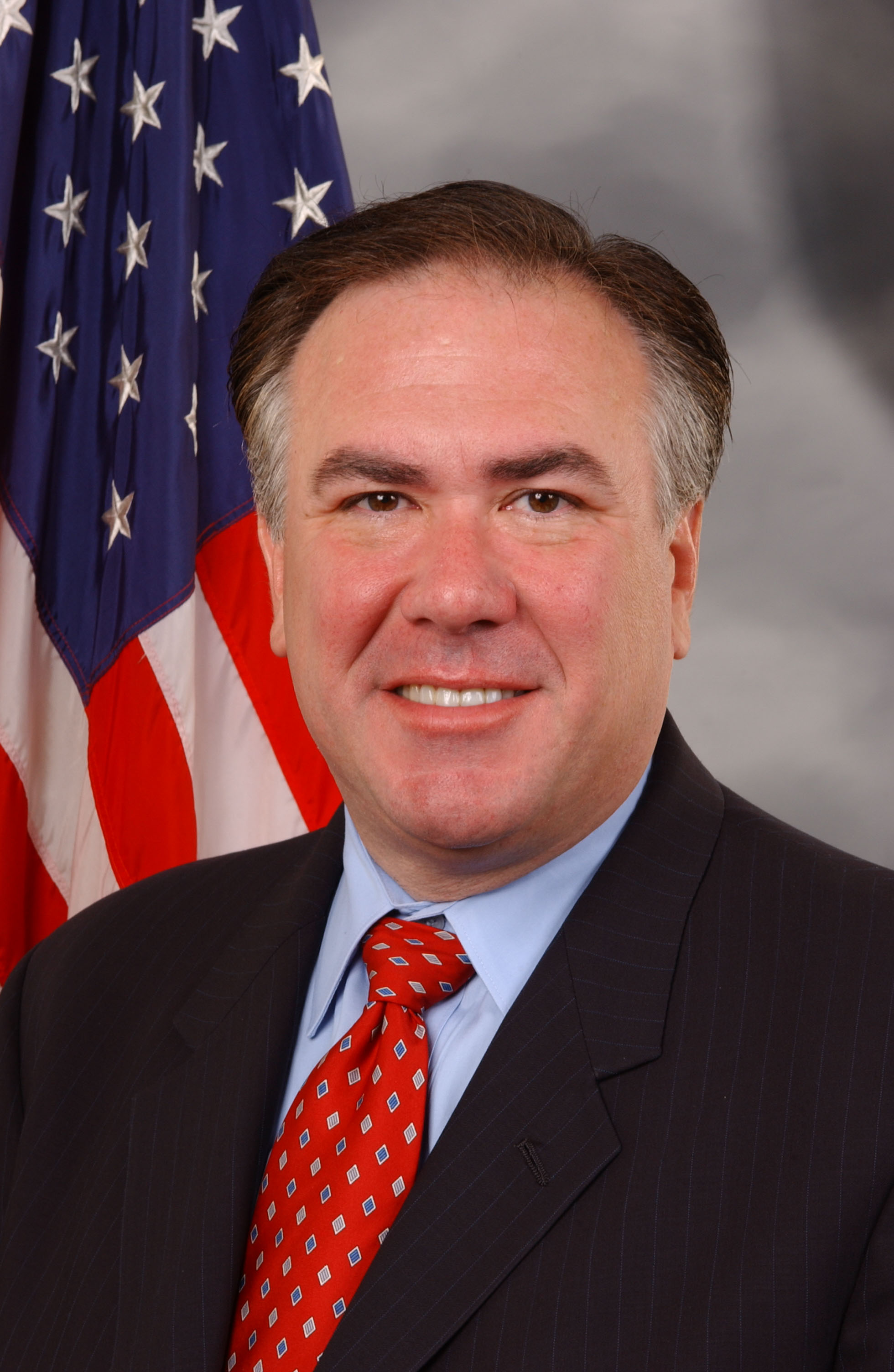
| Nominee | Dennis Cardoza |
| Party | Democratic |
| Popular vote | 130,192 |
| Percentage | 100.0% |
U.S. Representative before election
Dennis Cardoza
Democratic
Elected U.S. Representative
Dennis Cardoza
Democratic

(map)

- Race ranking and details from CQ Politics
- Campaign contributions from OpenSecrets

=== Predictions ===
| Source | Ranking | As of |
|---|---|---|
| The Cook Political Report | Safe D | November 6, 2008 |
| Rothenberg | Safe D | November 2, 2008 |
| Sabato's Crystal Ball | Safe D | November 6, 2008 |
| Real Clear Politics | Safe D | November 7, 2008 |
| CQ Politics | Safe D | November 6, 2008 |

California's 18th congressional district election, 2008
| Party | Candidate | Votes | % |
|---|---|---|---|
| Democratic | Dennis Cardoza (incumbent) | 130,192 | 100.00 |
| Total votes | | 130,192 | 100.00 |
| Turnout | | | 48.61 |
| Democratic hold | | | |

== District 19 ==
2008 California's 19th congressional district election
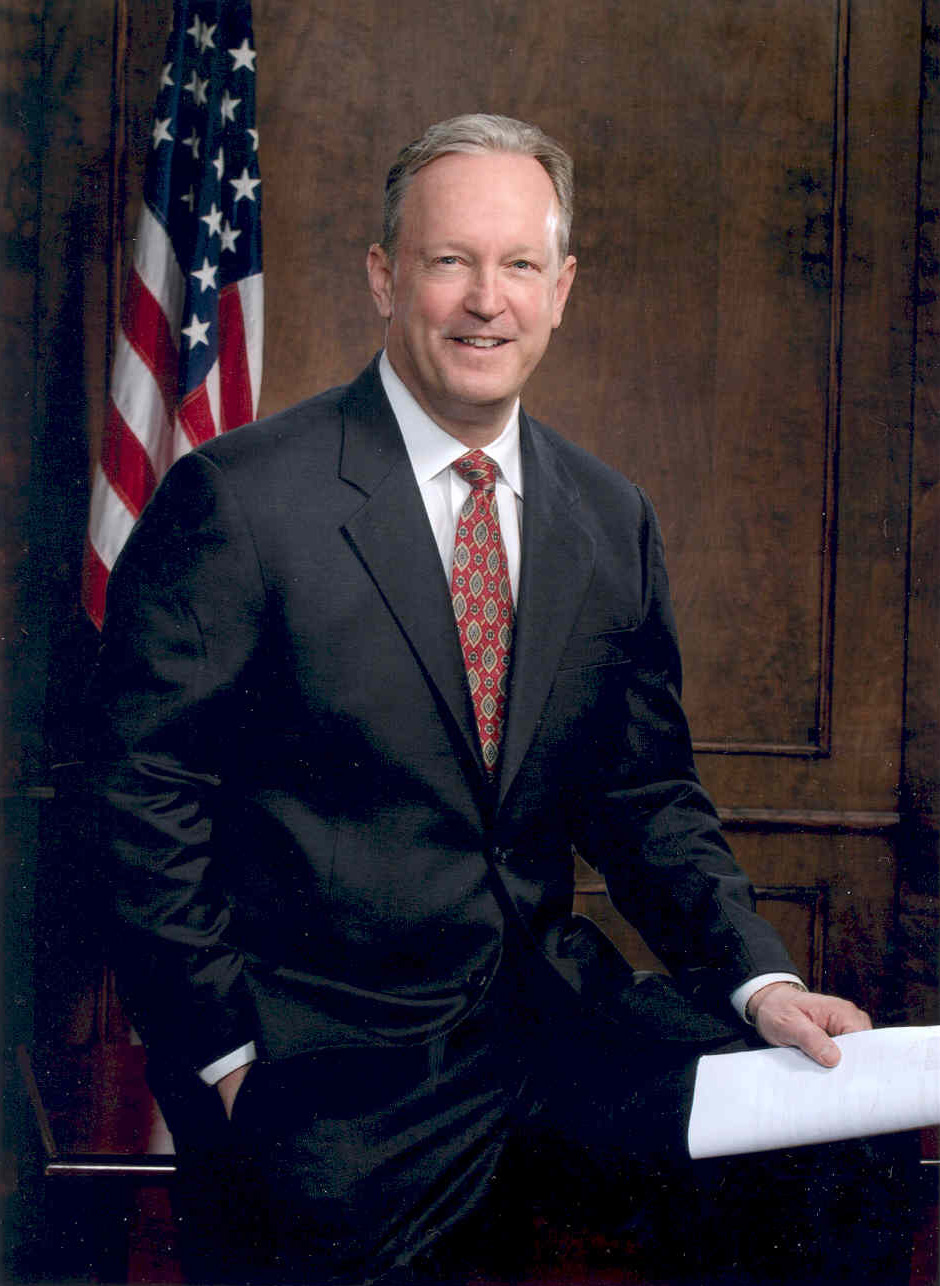
| Nominee | George Radanovich |
| Party | Republican |
| Popular vote | 179,245 |
| Percentage | 98.4% |
U.S. Representative before election
George Radanovich
Republican
Elected U.S. Representative
George Radanovich
Republican

(map)

- Race ranking and details from CQ Politics
- Campaign contributions from OpenSecrets

=== Predictions ===
| Source | Ranking | As of |
|---|---|---|
| The Cook Political Report | Safe R | November 6, 2008 |
| Rothenberg | Safe R | November 2, 2008 |
| Sabato's Crystal Ball | Safe R | November 6, 2008 |
| Real Clear Politics | Safe R | November 7, 2008 |
| CQ Politics | Safe R | November 6, 2008 |

California's 19th congressional district election, 2008
| Party | Candidate | Votes | % |
|---|---|---|---|
| Republican | George Radanovich (incumbent) | 179,245 | 98.43 |
| Democratic | Peter Leinau (write-in) | 2,490 | 1.37 |
| Independent | Phil Rockey (write-in) | 366 | 0.20 |
| Total votes | | 182,101 | 100.00 |
| Turnout | | | 51.19 |
| Republican hold | | | |

== District 20 ==
2008 California's 20th congressional district election
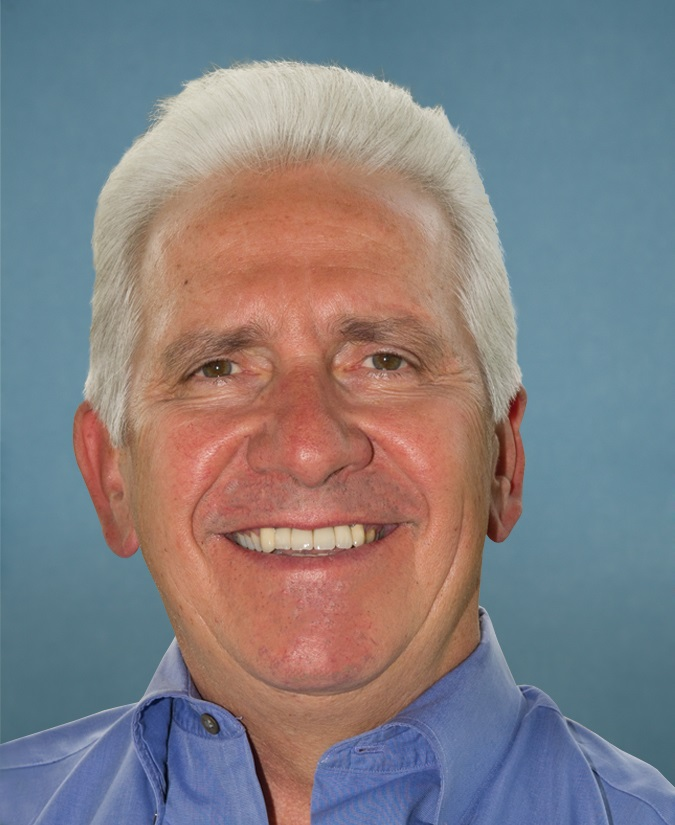

| Nominee | Jim Costa | Jim Lopez |
| Party | Democratic | Republican |
| Popular vote | 93,023 | 32,118 |
| Percentage | 74.3% | 25.7% |
- County results Costa: 60–70% 70–80%
U.S. Representative before election
Jim Costa
Democratic
Elected U.S. Representative
Jim Costa
Democratic

(map)

- Race ranking and details from CQ Politics
- Campaign contributions from OpenSecrets

=== Predictions ===
| Source | Ranking | As of |
|---|---|---|
| The Cook Political Report | Safe D | November 6, 2008 |
| Rothenberg | Safe D | November 2, 2008 |
| Sabato's Crystal Ball | Safe D | November 6, 2008 |
| Real Clear Politics | Safe D | November 7, 2008 |
| CQ Politics | Safe D | November 6, 2008 |

California's 20th congressional district election, 2008
| Party | Candidate | Votes | % |
|---|---|---|---|
| Democratic | Jim Costa (incumbent) | 93,023 | 74.33 |
| Republican | Jim Lopez | 32,118 | 25.67 |
| Total votes | | 125,141 | 100.00 |
| Turnout | | | 60.55 |
| Democratic hold | | | |

== District 21 ==
2008 California's 21st congressional district election
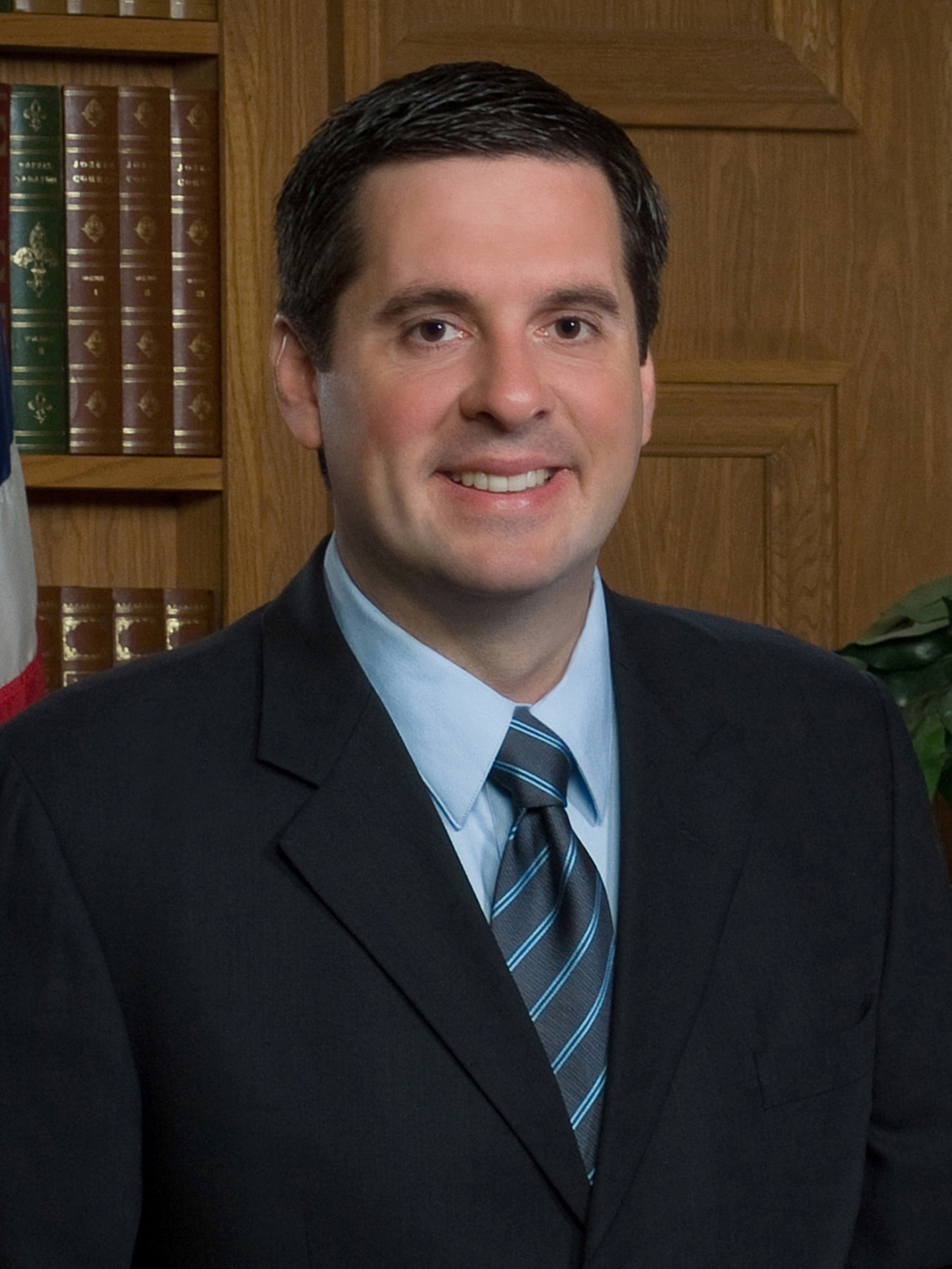

| Nominee | Devin Nunes | Larry Johnson |
| Party | Republican | Democratic |
| Popular vote | 143,498 | 66,317 |
| Percentage | 68.4% | 31.6% |
- County results Nunes: 60–70% 70–80%
U.S. Representative before election
Devin Nunes
Republican
Elected U.S. Representative
Devin Nunes
Republican

(map)

- Race ranking and details from CQ Politics
- Campaign contributions from OpenSecrets

=== Predictions ===
| Source | Ranking | As of |
|---|---|---|
| The Cook Political Report | Safe R | November 6, 2008 |
| Rothenberg | Safe R | November 2, 2008 |
| Sabato's Crystal Ball | Safe R | November 6, 2008 |
| Real Clear Politics | Safe R | November 7, 2008 |
| CQ Politics | Safe R | November 6, 2008 |

California's 21st congressional district election, 2008
| Party | Candidate | Votes | % |
|---|---|---|---|
| Republican | Devin Nunes (incumbent) | 143,498 | 68.39 |
| Democratic | Larry Johnson | 66,317 | 31.61 |
| Total votes | | 209,815 | 100.00 |
| Turnout | | | 69.40 |
| Republican hold | | | |

== District 22 ==
2008 California's 22nd congressional district election
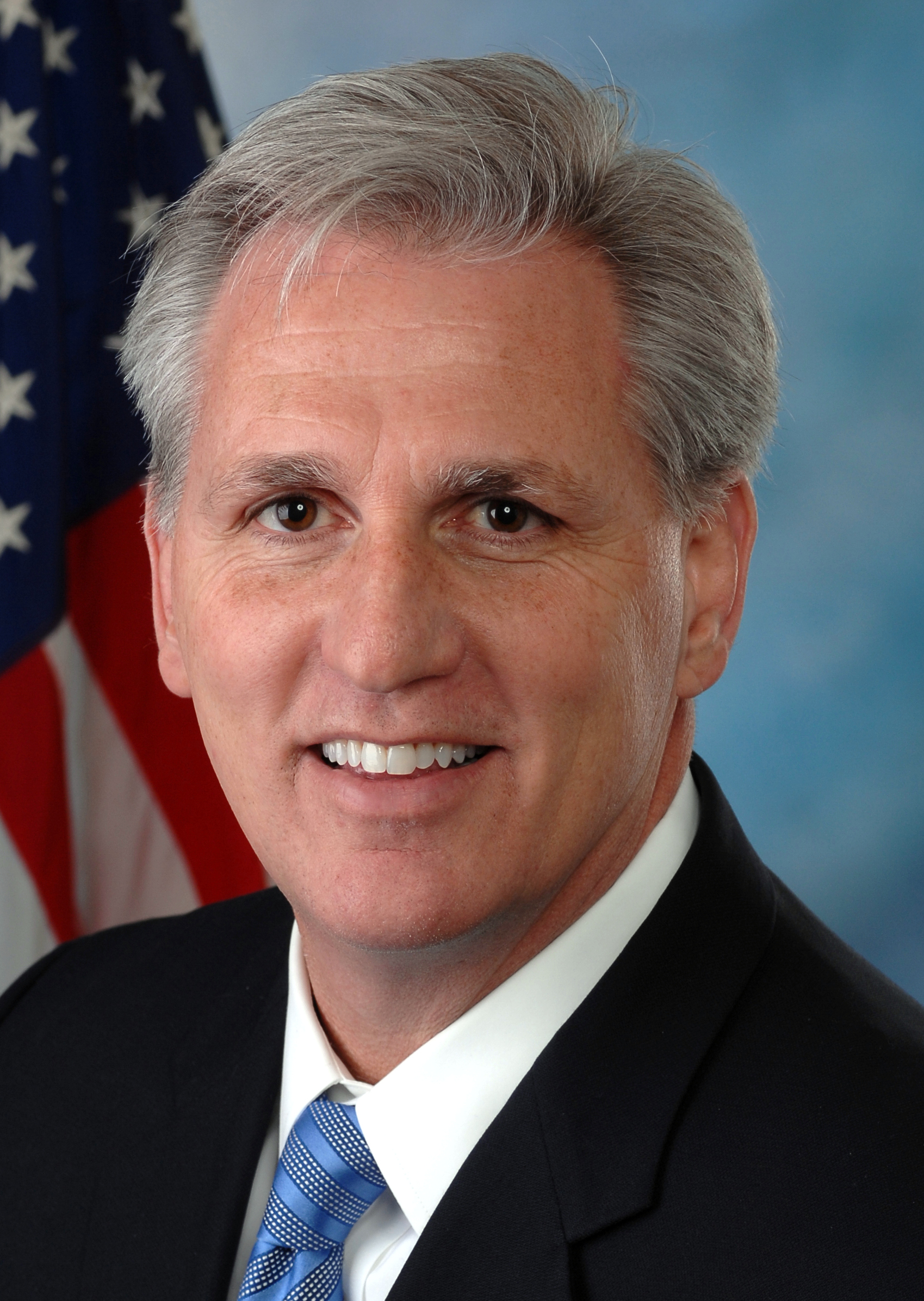
| Nominee | Kevin McCarthy |
| Party | Republican |
| Popular vote | 224,549 |
| Percentage | 100.0% |
U.S. Representative before election
Kevin McCarthy
Republican
Elected U.S. Representative
Kevin McCarthy
Republican

(map)

- Race ranking and details from CQ Politics
- Campaign contributions from OpenSecrets

=== Predictions ===
| Source | Ranking | As of |
|---|---|---|
| The Cook Political Report | Safe R | November 6, 2008 |
| Rothenberg | Safe R | November 2, 2008 |
| Sabato's Crystal Ball | Safe R | November 6, 2008 |
| Real Clear Politics | Safe R | November 7, 2008 |
| CQ Politics | Safe R | November 6, 2008 |

California's 22nd congressional district election, 2008
| Party | Candidate | Votes | % |
|---|---|---|---|
| Republican | Kevin McCarthy (incumbent) | 224,549 | 100.00 |
| Total votes | | 224,549 | 100.00 |
| Turnout | | | 61.56 |
| Republican hold | | | |

== District 23 ==
2008 California's 23rd congressional district election
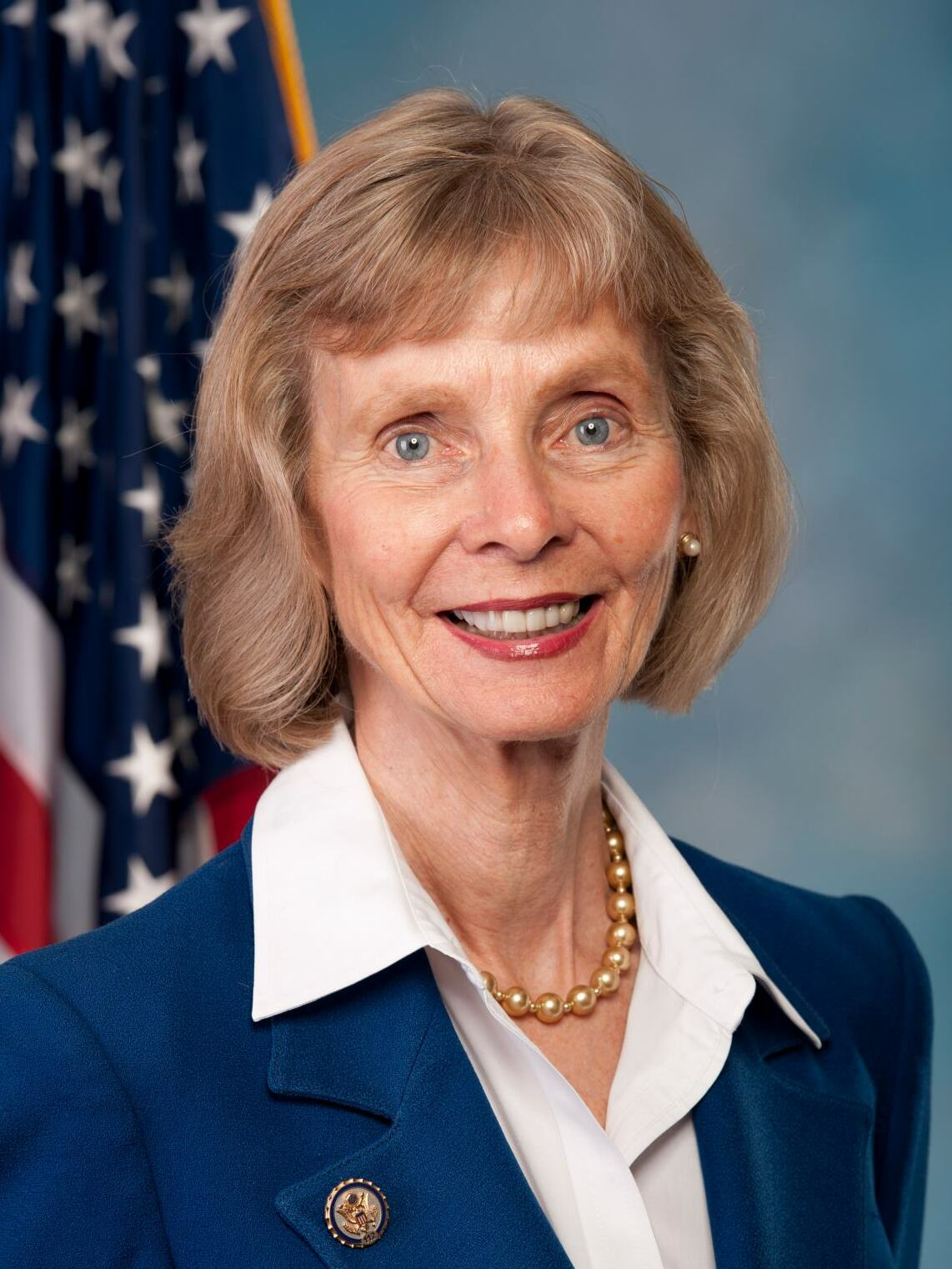

| Nominee | Lois Capps | Matt Kokkonen |
| Party | Democratic | Republican |
| Popular vote | 171,403 | 80,385 |
| Percentage | 68.1% | 31.9% |
- County results Capps: 60–70% 70–80%
U.S. Representative before election
Lois Capps
Democratic
Elected U.S. Representative
Lois Capps
Democratic

(map)

- Race ranking and details from CQ Politics
- Campaign contributions from OpenSecrets

=== Predictions ===
| Source | Ranking | As of |
|---|---|---|
| The Cook Political Report | Safe D | November 6, 2008 |
| Rothenberg | Safe D | November 2, 2008 |
| Sabato's Crystal Ball | Safe D | November 6, 2008 |
| Real Clear Politics | Safe D | November 7, 2008 |
| CQ Politics | Safe D | November 6, 2008 |

California's 23rd congressional district election, 2008
| Party | Candidate | Votes | % |
|---|---|---|---|
| Democratic | Lois Capps (incumbent) | 171,403 | 68.07 |
| Republican | Matt Kokkonen | 80,385 | 31.93 |
| Total votes | | 251,788 | 100.00 |
| Turnout | | | 77.41 |
| Democratic hold | | | |

== District 24 ==
2008 California's 24th congressional district election
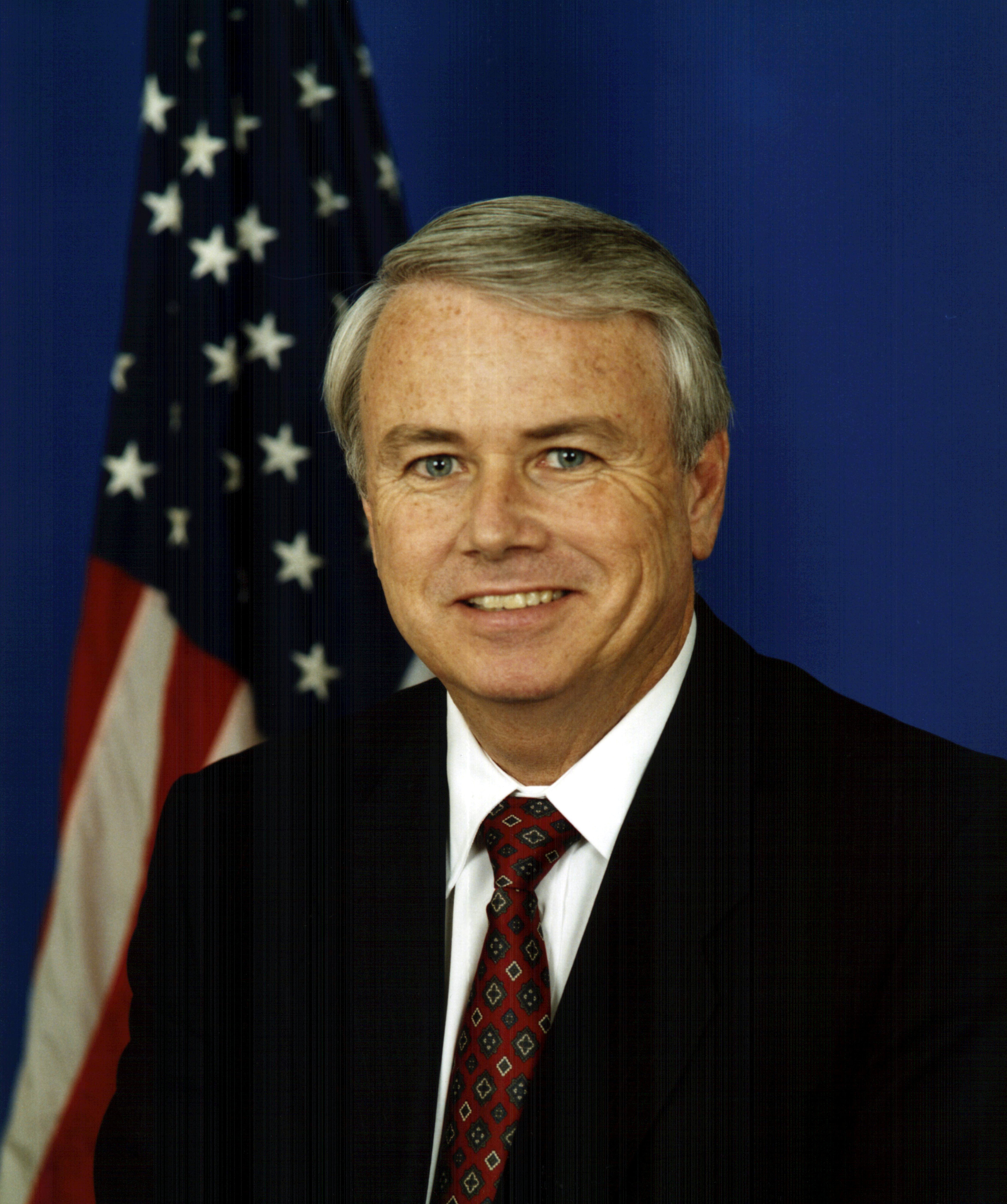

| Nominee | Elton Gallegly | Marta Jorgensen |
| Party | Republican | Democratic |
| Popular vote | 174,492 | 125,560 |
| Percentage | 58.1% | 41.9% |
- County results Gallegly: 50–60% 60–70%
U.S. Representative before election
Elton Gallegly
Republican
Elected U.S. Representative
Elton Gallegly
Republican

(map)

California's 24th congressional district has been represented by Republican Elton Gallegly since 1987. Although he had claimed that his 2006 campaign would be his last, Gallegly has announced that he intends to seek another term in 2008. Republican State Senator Tom McClintock, who has name statewide recognition from his several statewide campaigns, would have considered the likely frontrunner were there an open seat but moved to an open seat in Northern California's 4th District in 2008. McClintock had been an intra-party rival to Gallegly, who had hoped to have a political ally nominated to succeed him. Bush won 55% here in 2004.

- Race ranking and details from CQ Politics
- Campaign contributions from OpenSecrets

=== Predictions ===
| Source | Ranking | As of |
|---|---|---|
| The Cook Political Report | Safe R | November 6, 2008 |
| Rothenberg | Safe R | November 2, 2008 |
| Sabato's Crystal Ball | Safe R | November 6, 2008 |
| Real Clear Politics | Safe R | November 7, 2008 |
| CQ Politics | Safe R | November 6, 2008 |

California's 24th congressional district election, 2008
| Party | Candidate | Votes | % |
|---|---|---|---|
| Republican | Elton Gallegly (incumbent) | 174,492 | 58.15 |
| Democratic | Marta Jorgensen | 125,560 | 41.85 |
| Total votes | | 300,052 | 100.00 |
| Turnout | | | 77.30 |
| Republican hold | | | |

== District 25 ==
2008 California's 25th congressional district election
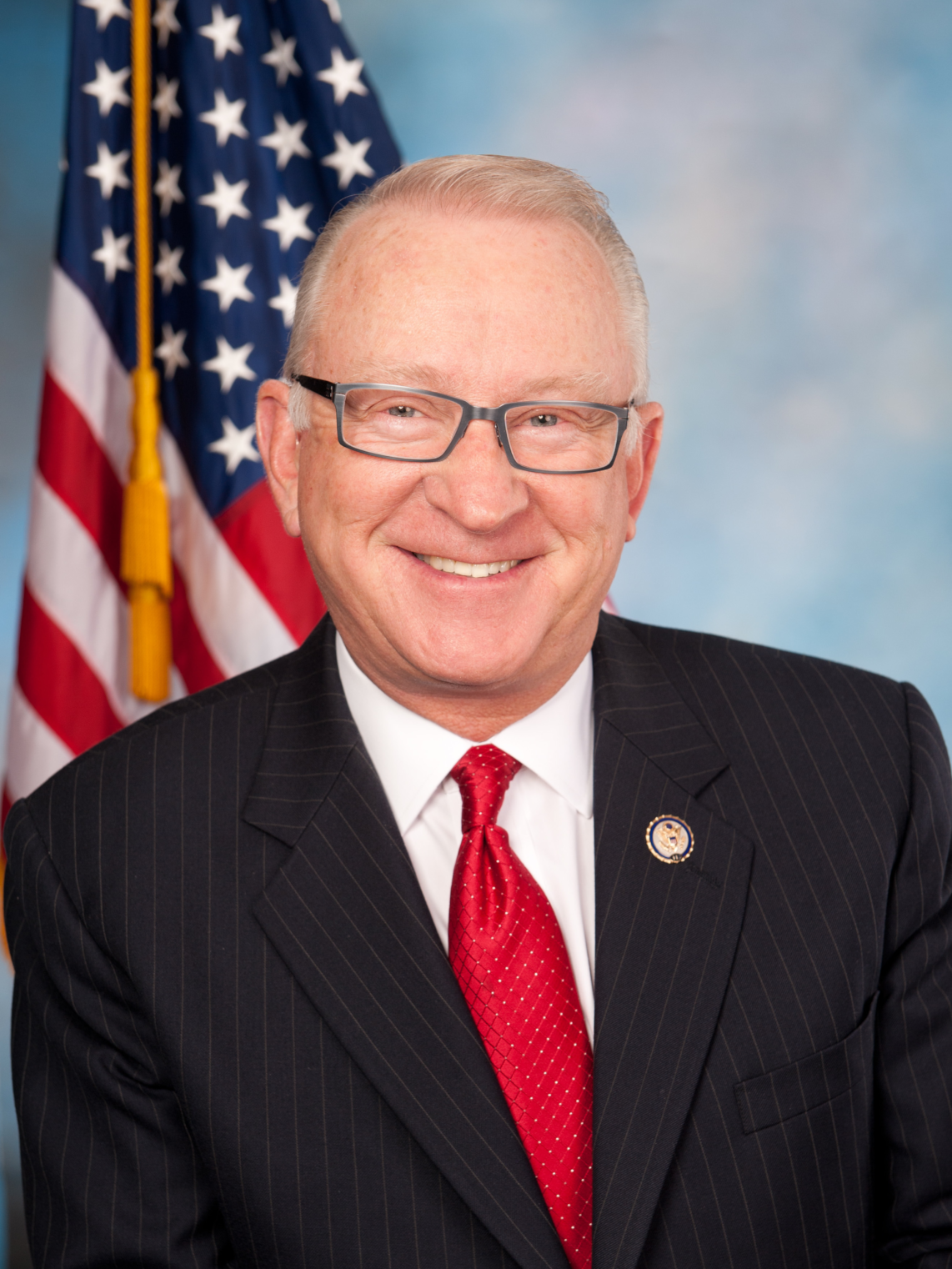

| Nominee | Howard McKeon | Jackie Conaway |
| Party | Republican | Democratic |
| Popular vote | 144,660 | 105,929 |
| Percentage | 57.7% | 42.3% |
- County results Mckeon: 50–60%
U.S. Representative before election
Howard McKeon
Republican
Elected U.S. Representative
Howard McKeon
Republican

(map)

- Race ranking and details from CQ Politics
- Campaign contributions from OpenSecrets

=== Predictions ===
| Source | Ranking | As of |
|---|---|---|
| The Cook Political Report | Safe R | November 6, 2008 |
| Rothenberg | Safe R | November 2, 2008 |
| Sabato's Crystal Ball | Safe R | November 6, 2008 |
| Real Clear Politics | Safe R | November 7, 2008 |
| CQ Politics | Safe R | November 6, 2008 |

California's 25th congressional district election, 2008
| Party | Candidate | Votes | % |
|---|---|---|---|
| Republican | Howard McKeon (incumbent) | 144,660 | 57.73 |
| Democratic | Jackie Conaway | 105,929 | 42.27 |
| Total votes | | 250,589 | 100.00 |
| Turnout | | | 72.24 |
| Republican hold | | | |

== District 26 ==
2008 California's 26th congressional district election
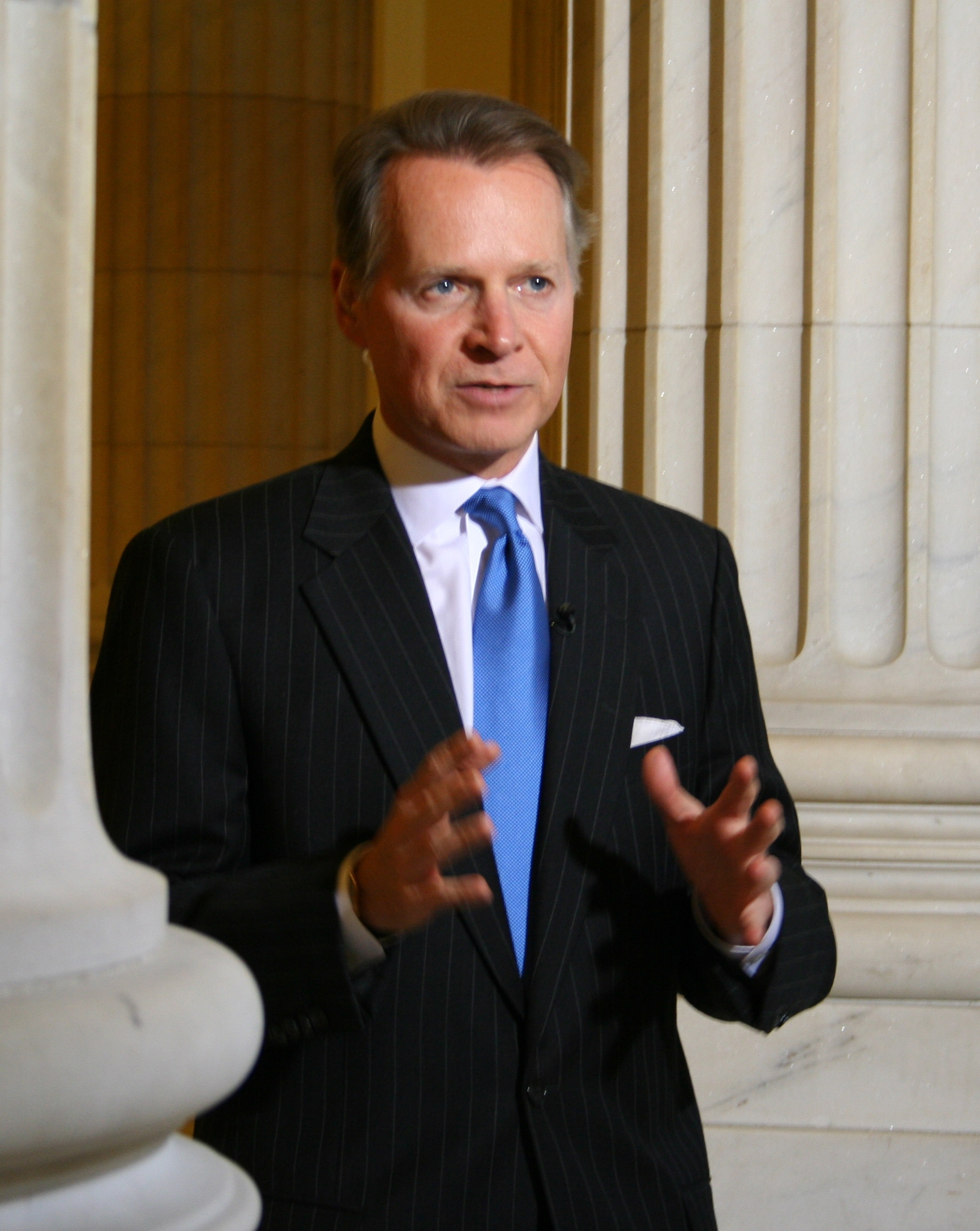

| Nominee | David Dreier | Russ Warner | Ted Brown |
| Party | Republican | Democratic | Libertarian |
| Popular vote | 140,615 | 108,039 | 18,476 |
| Percentage | 52.6% | 40.4% | 6.9% |
- County results Dreier: 50–60%
U.S. Representative before election
David Dreier
Republican
Elected U.S. Representative
David Dreier
Republican

(map)

- Race ranking and details from CQ Politics
- Campaign contributions from OpenSecrets
- Dreier (R-i) vs Warner (D) graph of collected poll results from Pollster.com

=== Predictions ===
| Source | Ranking | As of |
|---|---|---|
| The Cook Political Report | Likely R | November 6, 2008 |
| Rothenberg | Safe R | November 2, 2008 |
| Sabato's Crystal Ball | Safe R | November 6, 2008 |
| Real Clear Politics | Safe R | November 7, 2008 |
| CQ Politics | Likely R | November 6, 2008 |

California's 26th congressional district election, 2008
| Party | Candidate | Votes | % |
|---|---|---|---|
| Republican | David Dreier (incumbent) | 140,615 | 52.64 |
| Democratic | Russ Warner | 108,039 | 40.44 |
| Libertarian | Ted Brown | 18,476 | 6.92 |
| Total votes | | 267,130 | 100.00 |
| Turnout | | | 72.22 |
| Republican hold | | | |

== District 27 ==
2008 California's 27th congressional district election
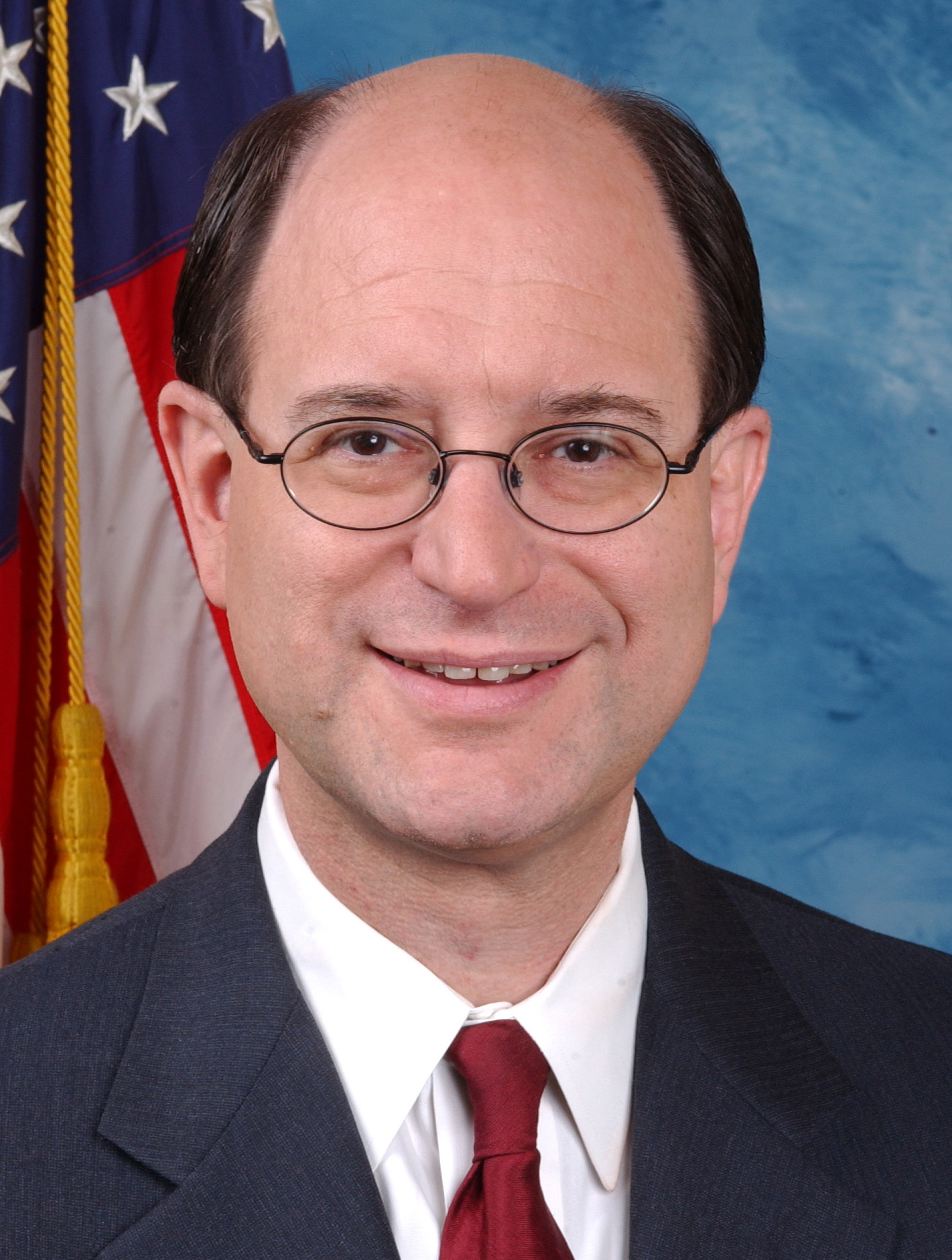

| Nominee | Brad Sherman | Navraj Singh | Tim Denton |
| Party | Democratic | Republican | Libertarian |
| Popular vote | 145,812 | 52,852 | 14,171 |
| Percentage | 68.5% | 24.8% | 6.7% |
- County results Sherman: 60–70%
U.S. Representative before election
Brad Sherman
Democratic
Elected U.S. Representative
Brad Sherman
Democratic

(map)

- Race ranking and details from CQ Politics
- Campaign contributions from OpenSecrets

=== Predictions ===
| Source | Ranking | As of |
|---|---|---|
| The Cook Political Report | Safe D | November 6, 2008 |
| Rothenberg | Safe D | November 2, 2008 |
| Sabato's Crystal Ball | Safe D | November 6, 2008 |
| Real Clear Politics | Safe D | November 7, 2008 |
| CQ Politics | Safe D | November 6, 2008 |

California's 27th congressional district election, 2008
| Party | Candidate | Votes | % |
|---|---|---|---|
| Democratic | Brad Sherman (incumbent) | 145,812 | 68.51 |
| Republican | Navraj Singh | 52,852 | 24.83 |
| Libertarian | Tim Denton | 14,171 | 6.66 |
| Total votes | | 212,835 | 100.00 |
| Turnout | | | 70.78 |
| Democratic hold | | | |

== District 28 ==
2008 California's 28th congressional district election
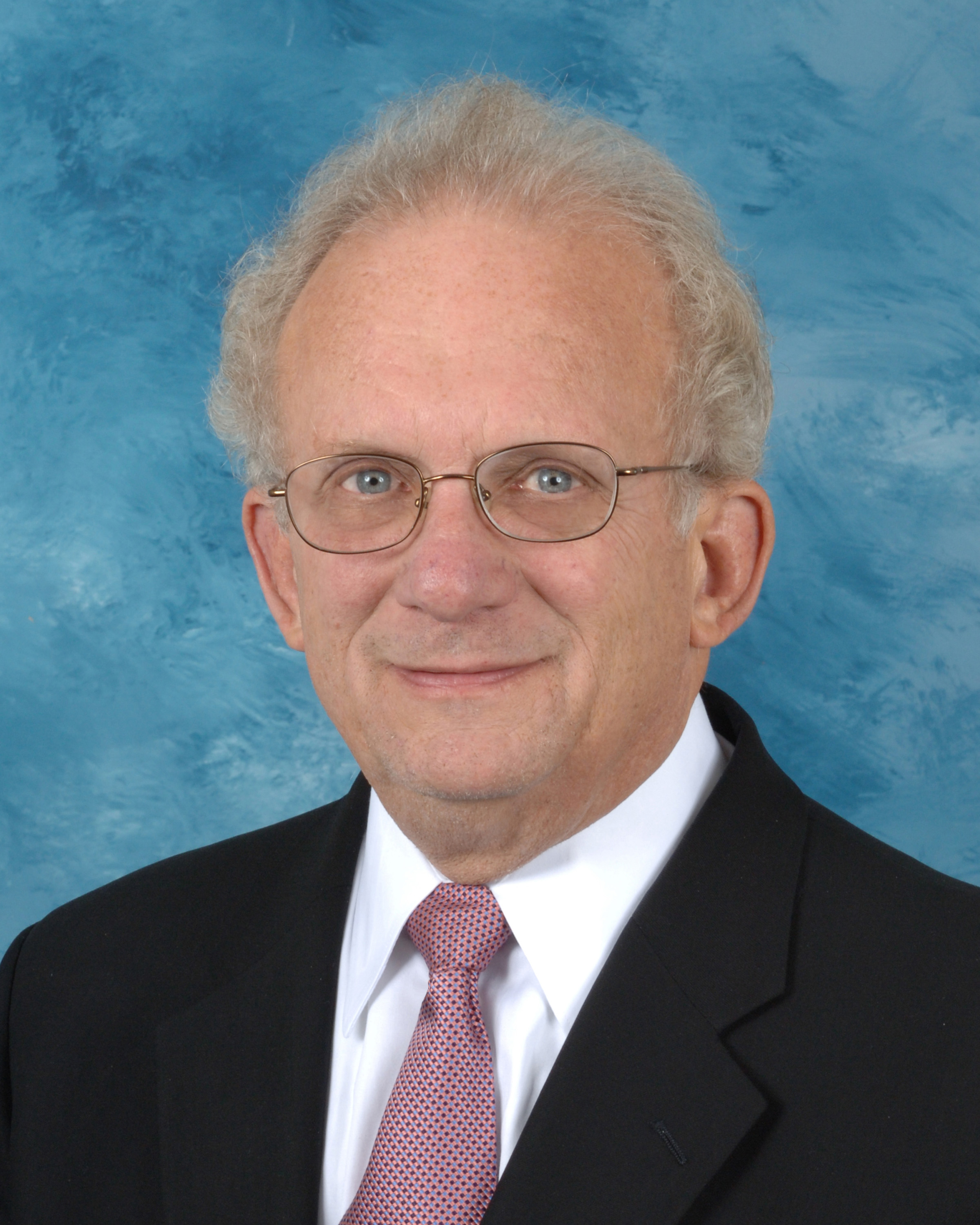
| Nominee | Howard Berman |
| Party | Democratic |
| Popular vote | 137,471 |
| Percentage | 99.9% |
U.S. Representative before election
Howard Berman
Democratic
Elected U.S. Representative
Howard Berman
Democratic

(map)

- Race ranking and details from CQ Politics
- Campaign contributions from OpenSecrets

=== Predictions ===
| Source | Ranking | As of |
|---|---|---|
| The Cook Political Report | Safe D | November 6, 2008 |
| Rothenberg | Safe D | November 2, 2008 |
| Sabato's Crystal Ball | Safe D | November 6, 2008 |
| Real Clear Politics | Safe D | November 7, 2008 |
| CQ Politics | Safe D | November 6, 2008 |

California's 28th congressional district election, 2008
| Party | Candidate | Votes | % |
|---|---|---|---|
| Democratic | Howard Berman (incumbent) | 137,471 | 99.89 |
| Independent | Michael Koch (write-in) | 150 | 0.11 |
| Total votes | | 137,621 | 100.00 |
| Turnout | | | 55.68 |
| Democratic hold | | | |

== District 29 ==
2008 California's 29th congressional district election
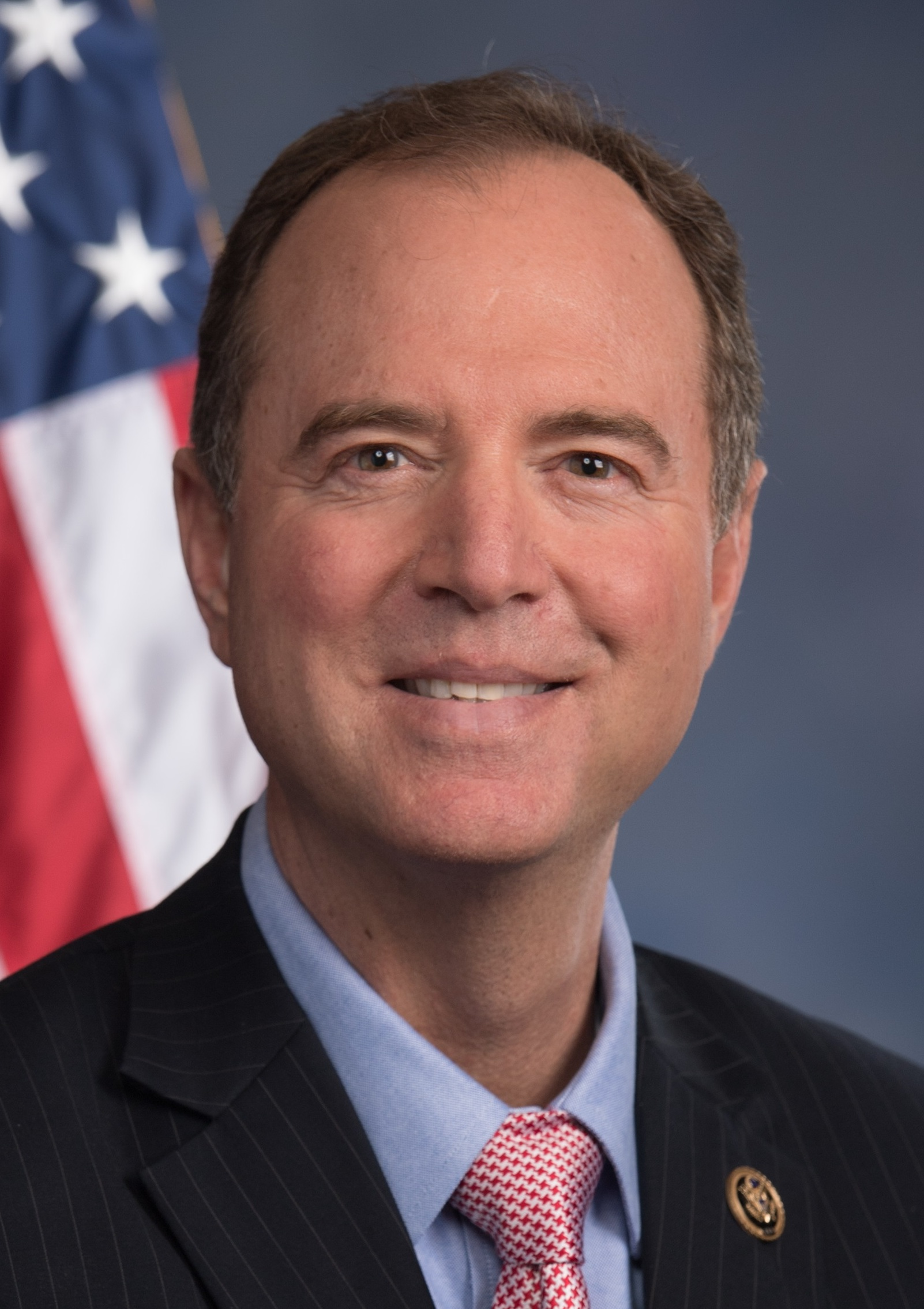

| Nominee | Adam Schiff | Charles Hahn |
| Party | Democratic | Republican |
| Popular vote | 146,198 | 56,727 |
| Percentage | 68.9% | 26.7% |
- County results Schiff: 60–70%
U.S. Representative before election
Adam Schiff
Democratic
Elected U.S. Representative
Adam Schiff
Democratic

(map)

- Race ranking and details from CQ Politics
- Campaign contributions from OpenSecrets

=== Predictions ===
| Source | Ranking | As of |
|---|---|---|
| The Cook Political Report | Safe D | November 6, 2008 |
| Rothenberg | Safe D | November 2, 2008 |
| Sabato's Crystal Ball | Safe D | November 6, 2008 |
| Real Clear Politics | Safe D | November 7, 2008 |
| CQ Politics | Safe D | November 6, 2008 |

California's 29th congressional district election, 2008
| Party | Candidate | Votes | % |
|---|---|---|---|
| Democratic | Adam Schiff (incumbent) | 146,198 | 68.91 |
| Republican | Charles Hahn | 56,727 | 26.74 |
| Libertarian | Alan Pyeatt | 9,219 | 4.35 |
| Total votes | | 212,144 | 100.00 |
| Turnout | | | 68.57 |
| Democratic hold | | | |

== District 30 ==
2008 California's 30th congressional district election
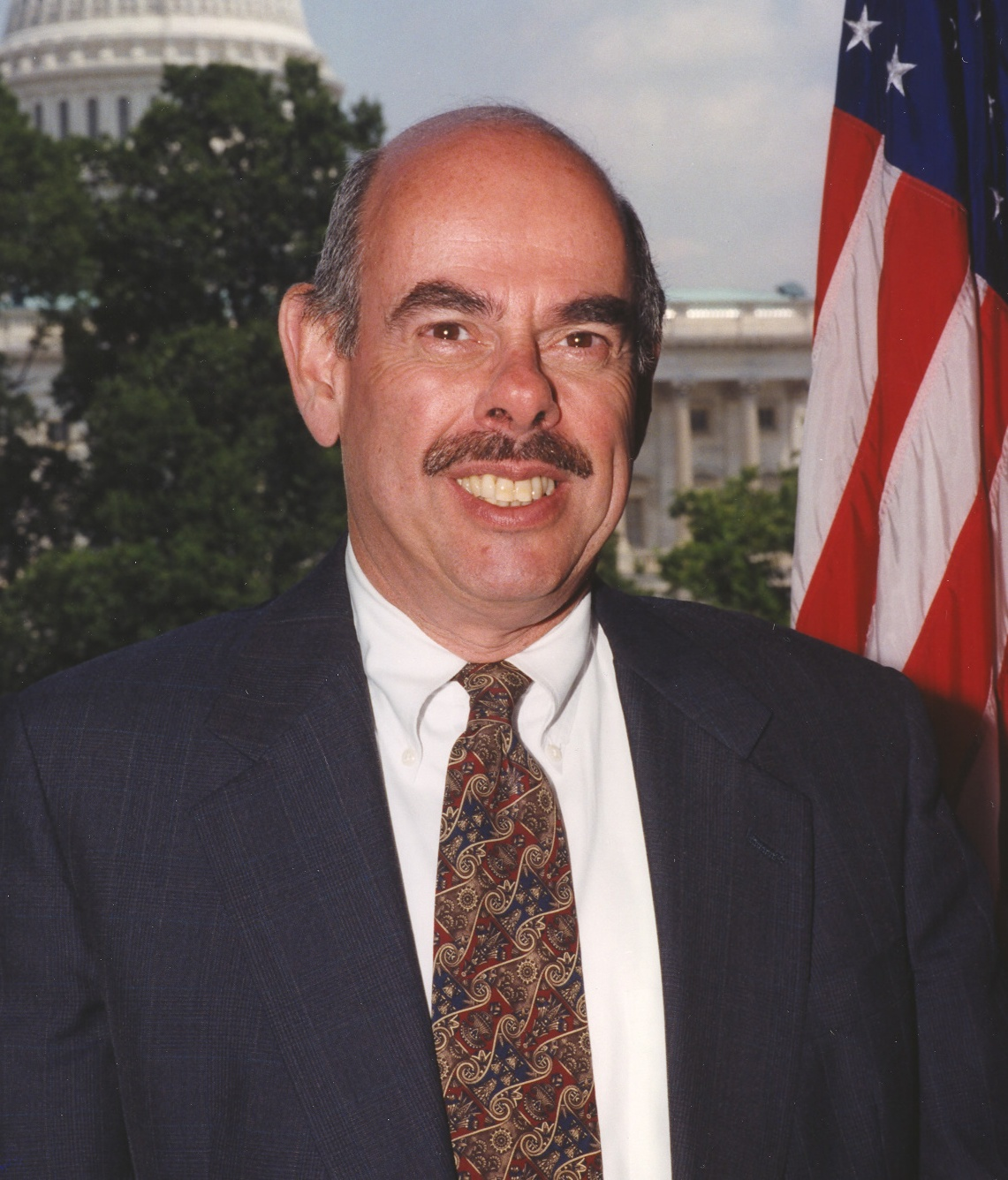
| Nominee | Henry Waxman |
| Party | Democratic |
| Popular vote | 242,792 |
| Percentage | 100.0% |
U.S. Representative before election
Henry Waxman
Democratic
Elected U.S. Representative
Henry Waxman
Democratic

(map)

- Race ranking and details from CQ Politics
- Campaign contributions from OpenSecrets

=== Predictions ===
| Source | Ranking | As of |
|---|---|---|
| The Cook Political Report | Safe D | November 6, 2008 |
| Rothenberg | Safe D | November 2, 2008 |
| Sabato's Crystal Ball | Safe D | November 6, 2008 |
| Real Clear Politics | Safe D | November 7, 2008 |
| CQ Politics | Safe D | November 6, 2008 |

California's 30th congressional district election, 2008
| Party | Candidate | Votes | % |
|---|---|---|---|
| Democratic | Henry Waxman (incumbent) | 242,792 | 100.00 |
| Total votes | | 242,792 | 100.00 |
| Turnout | | | 58.37 |
| Democratic hold | | | |

== District 31 ==
2008 California's 31st congressional district election
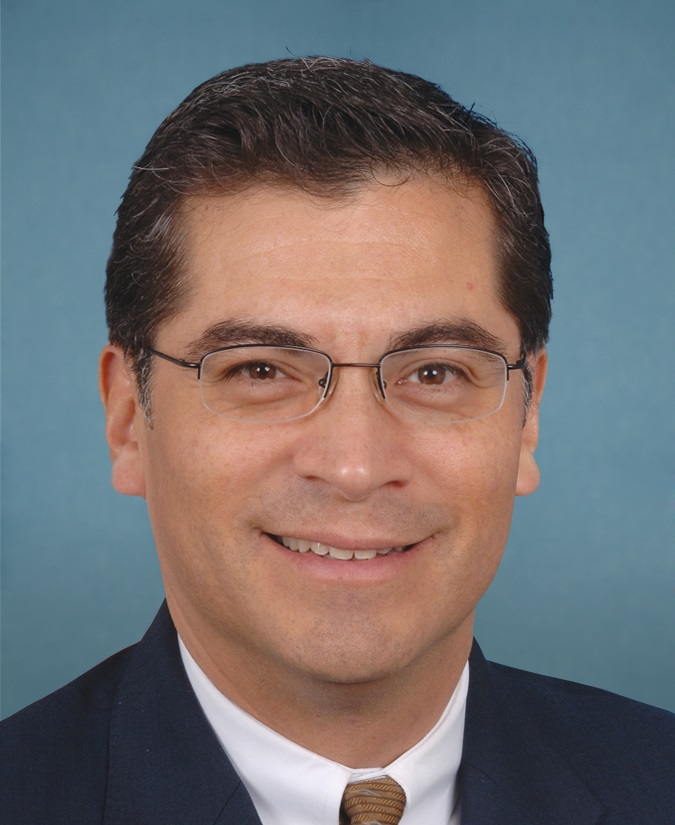
| Nominee | Xavier Becerra |
| Party | Democratic |
| Popular vote | 110,955 |
| Percentage | 100.0% |
U.S. Representative before election
Xavier Becerra
Democratic
Elected U.S. Representative
Xavier Becerra
Democratic

(map)

- Race ranking and details from CQ Politics
- Campaign contributions from OpenSecrets

=== Predictions ===
| Source | Ranking | As of |
|---|---|---|
| The Cook Political Report | Safe D | November 6, 2008 |
| Rothenberg | Safe D | November 2, 2008 |
| Sabato's Crystal Ball | Safe D | November 6, 2008 |
| Real Clear Politics | Safe D | November 7, 2008 |
| CQ Politics | Safe D | November 6, 2008 |

California's 31st congressional district election, 2008
| Party | Candidate | Votes | % |
|---|---|---|---|
| Democratic | Xavier Becerra (incumbent) | 110,955 | 100.00 |
| Total votes | | 110,955 | 100.00 |
| Turnout | | | 57.69 |
| Democratic hold | | | |

== District 32 ==
2008 California's 32nd congressional district election
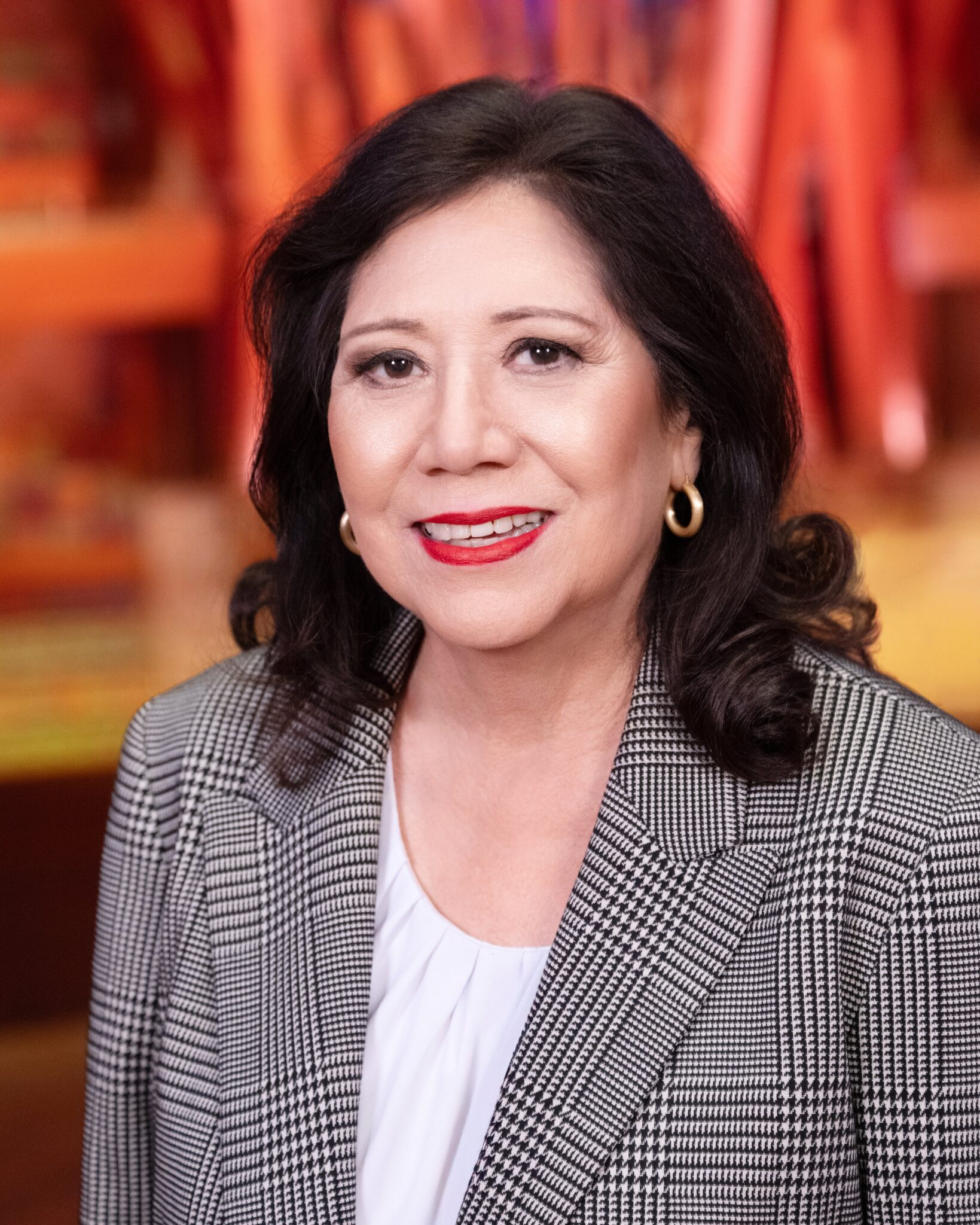
| Nominee | Hilda Solis |
| Party | Democratic |
| Popular vote | 130,142 |
| Percentage | 100.0% |
U.S. Representative before election
Hilda Solis
Democratic
Elected U.S. Representative
Hilda Solis
Democratic

(map)

- Race ranking and details from CQ Politics
- Campaign contributions from OpenSecrets

=== Predictions ===
| Source | Ranking | As of |
|---|---|---|
| The Cook Political Report | Safe D | November 6, 2008 |
| Rothenberg | Safe D | November 2, 2008 |
| Sabato's Crystal Ball | Safe D | November 6, 2008 |
| Real Clear Politics | Safe D | November 7, 2008 |
| CQ Politics | Safe D | November 6, 2008 |

California's 32nd congressional district election, 2008
| Party | Candidate | Votes | % |
|---|---|---|---|
| Democratic | Hilda Solis (incumbent) | 130,142 | 99.99 |
| Independent | Innocent Osunwa (write-in) | 8 | 0.01 |
| Total votes | | 130,150 | 100.00 |
| Turnout | | | 53.65 |
| Democratic hold | | | |

== District 33 ==
2008 California's 33rd congressional district election
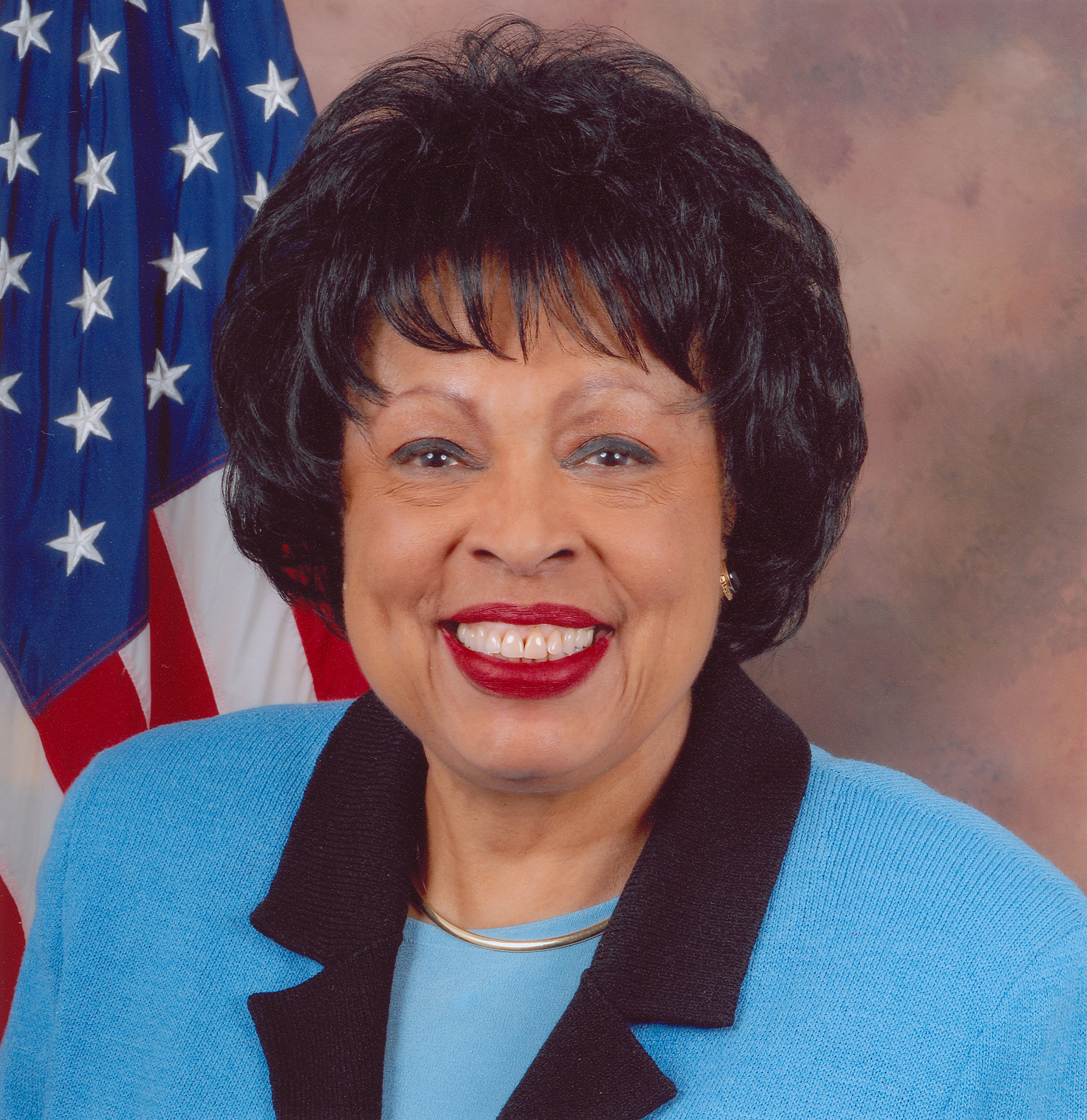

| Nominee | Diane Watson | David Crowley |
| Party | Democratic | Republican |
| Popular vote | 186,924 | 26,536 |
| Percentage | 87.6% | 12.4% |
- County results Watson: 80–90%
U.S. Representative before election
Diane Watson
Democratic
Elected U.S. Representative
Diane Watson
Democratic

(map)

- Race ranking and details from CQ Politics
- Campaign contributions from OpenSecrets

=== Predictions ===
| Source | Ranking | As of |
|---|---|---|
| The Cook Political Report | Safe D | November 6, 2008 |
| Rothenberg | Safe D | November 2, 2008 |
| Sabato's Crystal Ball | Safe D | November 6, 2008 |
| Real Clear Politics | Safe D | November 7, 2008 |
| CQ Politics | Safe D | November 6, 2008 |

California's 33rd congressional district election, 2008
| Party | Candidate | Votes | % |
|---|---|---|---|
| Democratic | Diane Watson (incumbent) | 186,924 | 87.57 |
| Republican | David Crowley | 26,536 | 12.43 |
| Total votes | | 213,460 | 100.00 |
| Turnout | | | 70.19 |
| Democratic hold | | | |

== District 34 ==
2008 California's 34th congressional district election
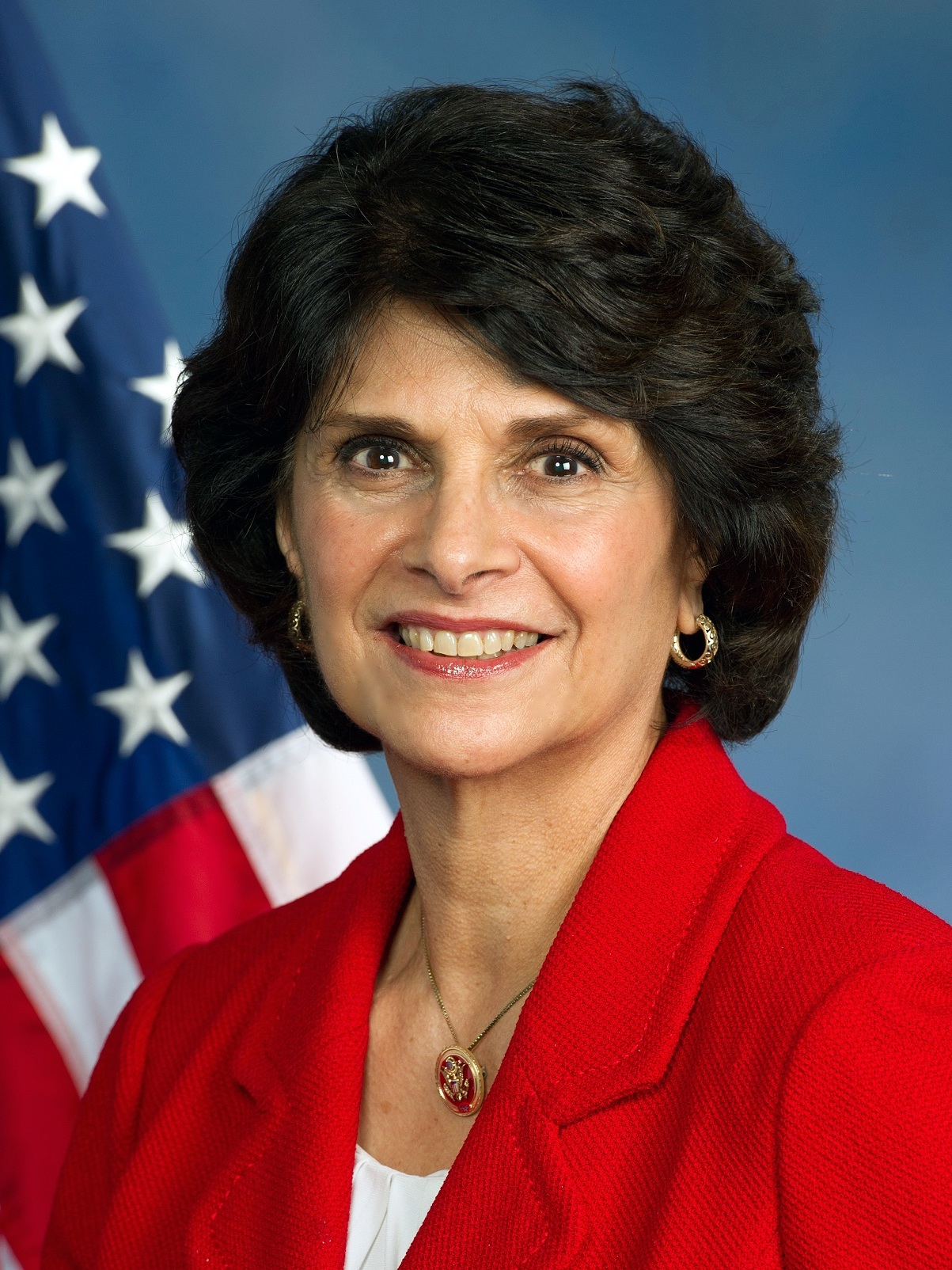

| Nominee | Lucille Roybal-Allard | Christopher Balding |
| Party | Democratic | Republican |
| Popular vote | 98,503 | 29,266 |
| Percentage | 77.1% | 22.9% |
- County results Roybal-Allard: 70–80%
U.S. Representative before election
Lucille Roybal-Allard
Democratic
Elected U.S. Representative
Lucille Roybal-Allard
Democratic

(map)

- Race ranking and details from CQ Politics
- Campaign contributions from OpenSecrets

=== Predictions ===
| Source | Ranking | As of |
|---|---|---|
| The Cook Political Report | Safe D | November 6, 2008 |
| Rothenberg | Safe D | November 2, 2008 |
| Sabato's Crystal Ball | Safe D | November 6, 2008 |
| Real Clear Politics | Safe D | November 7, 2008 |
| CQ Politics | Safe D | November 6, 2008 |

California's 34th congressional district election, 2008
| Party | Candidate | Votes | % |
|---|---|---|---|
| Democratic | Lucille Roybal-Allard (incumbent) | 98,503 | 77.09 |
| Republican | Christopher Balding | 29,266 | 22.91 |
| Total votes | | 127,769 | 100.00 |
| Turnout | | | 63.68 |
| Democratic hold | | | |

== District 35 ==
2008 California's 35th congressional district election
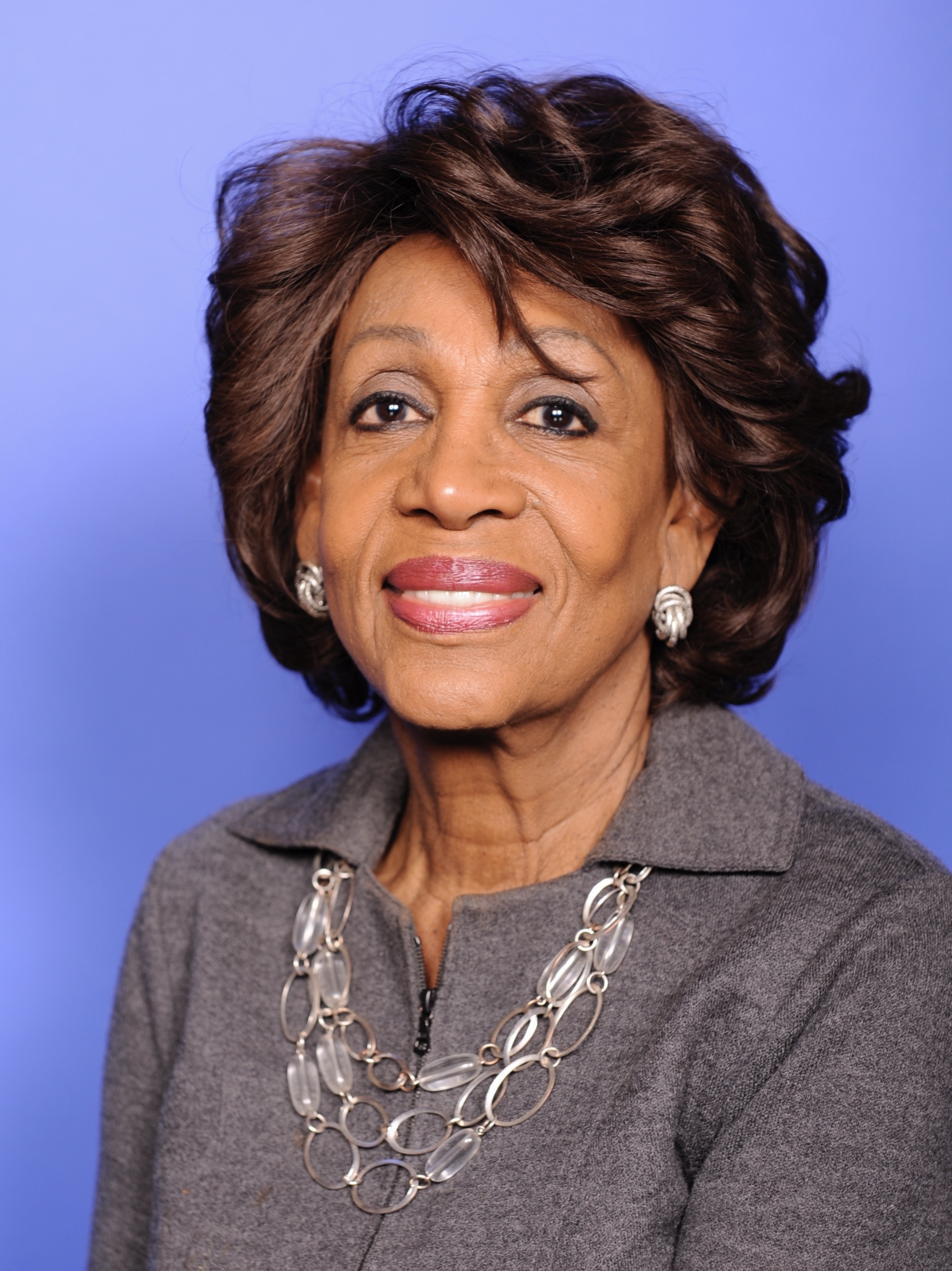

| Nominee | Maxine Waters | Ted Hayes |
| Party | Democratic | Republican |
| Popular vote | 150,778 | 24,169 |
| Percentage | 82.6% | 13.2% |
- County results Waters: 80–90%
U.S. Representative before election
Maxine Waters
Democratic
Elected U.S. Representative
Maxine Waters
Democratic

(map)

- Race ranking and details from CQ Politics
- Campaign contributions from OpenSecrets

=== Predictions ===
| Source | Ranking | As of |
|---|---|---|
| The Cook Political Report | Safe D | November 6, 2008 |
| Rothenberg | Safe D | November 2, 2008 |
| Sabato's Crystal Ball | Safe D | November 6, 2008 |
| Real Clear Politics | Safe D | November 7, 2008 |
| CQ Politics | Safe D | November 6, 2008 |

California's 35th congressional district election, 2008
| Party | Candidate | Votes | % |
|---|---|---|---|
| Democratic | Maxine Waters (incumbent) | 150,778 | 82.58 |
| Republican | Ted Hayes | 24,169 | 13.24 |
| Libertarian | Herb Peters | 7,632 | 4.18 |
| Total votes | | 182,579 | 100.00 |
| Turnout | | | 69.73 |
| Democratic hold | | | |

== District 36 ==
2008 California's 36th congressional district election
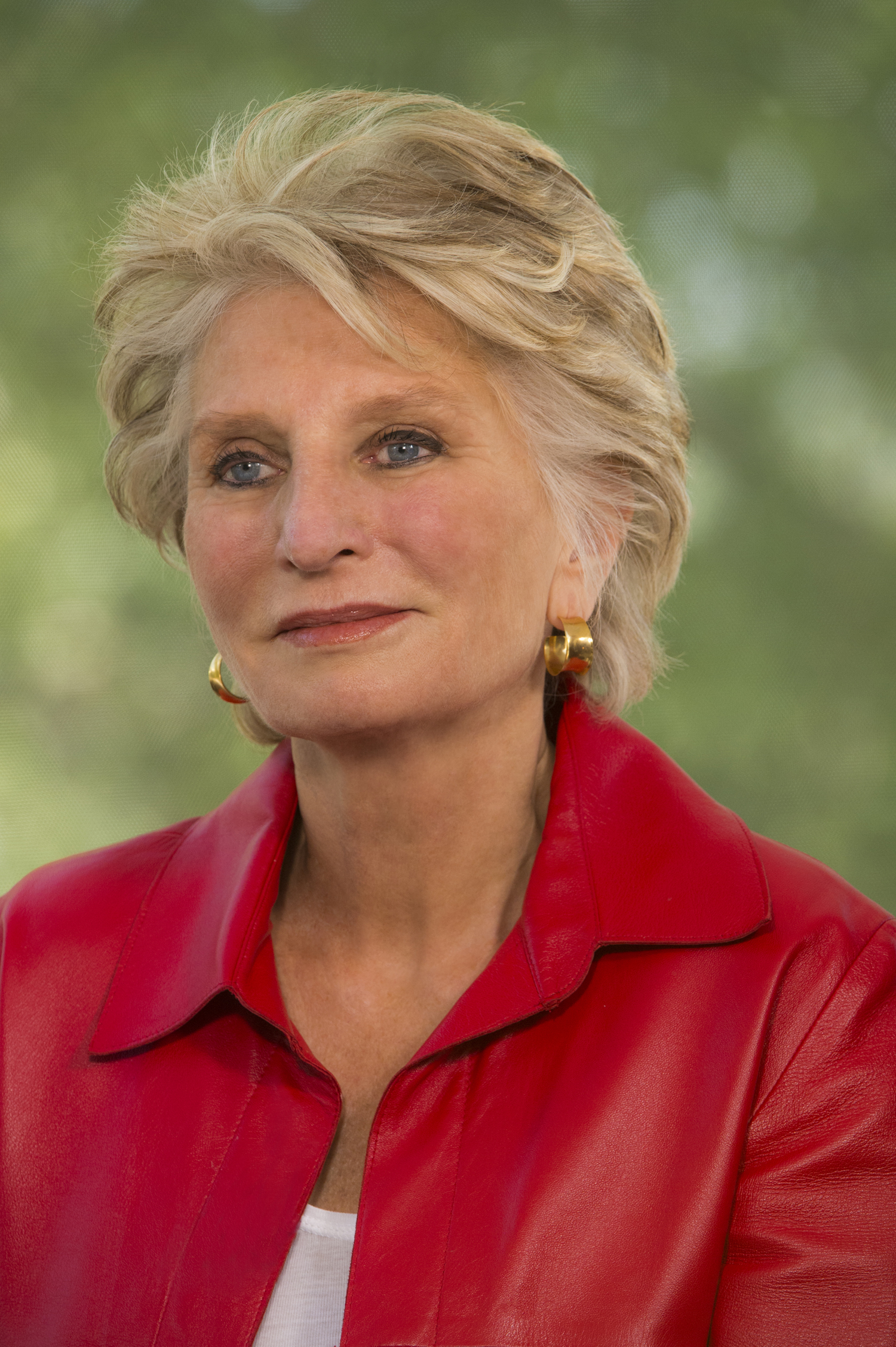

| Nominee | Jane Harman | Brian Gibson |
| Party | Democratic | Republican |
| Popular vote | 171,948 | 78,543 |
| Percentage | 68.6% | 31.4% |
- County results Harman: 60–70%
U.S. Representative before election
Jane Harman
Democratic
Elected U.S. Representative
Jane Harman
Democratic

(map)

- Race ranking and details from CQ Politics
- Campaign contributions from OpenSecrets

=== Predictions ===
| Source | Ranking | As of |
|---|---|---|
| The Cook Political Report | Safe D | November 6, 2008 |
| Rothenberg | Safe D | November 2, 2008 |
| Sabato's Crystal Ball | Safe D | November 6, 2008 |
| Real Clear Politics | Safe D | November 7, 2008 |
| CQ Politics | Safe D | November 6, 2008 |

California's 36th congressional district election, 2008
| Party | Candidate | Votes | % |
|---|---|---|---|
| Democratic | Jane Harman (incumbent) | 171,948 | 68.64 |
| Republican | Brian Gibson | 78,543 | 31.36 |
| Total votes | | 250,491 | 100.00 |
| Turnout | | | 74.36 |
| Democratic hold | | | |

== District 37 ==
2008 California's 37th congressional district election
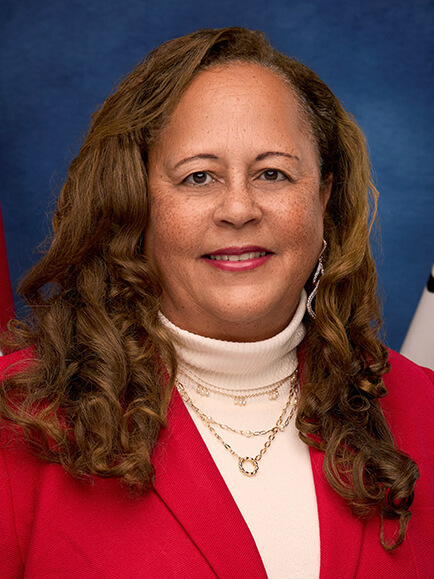

| Nominee | Laura Richardson | Nicholas Dibs |
| Party | Democratic | Independent |
| Popular vote | 131,342 | 42,774 |
| Percentage | 74.9% | 24.4% |
- County results Richardson: 70–80%
U.S. Representative before election
Laura Richardson
Democratic
Elected U.S. Representative
Laura Richardson
Democratic

(map)

This district has been represented by Democrat Laura Richardson since winning a special election on August 21, 2007, that was called after Democrat Juanita Millender-McDonald died. The district includes Compton, some of central south-west Los Angeles and most of Culver City.

- Race ranking and details from CQ Politics
- Campaign contributions from OpenSecrets

=== Predictions ===
| Source | Ranking | As of |
|---|---|---|
| The Cook Political Report | Safe D | November 6, 2008 |
| Rothenberg | Safe D | November 2, 2008 |
| Sabato's Crystal Ball | Safe D | November 6, 2008 |
| Real Clear Politics | Safe D | November 7, 2008 |
| CQ Politics | Safe D | November 6, 2008 |

California's 37th congressional district election, 2008
| Party | Candidate | Votes | % |
|---|---|---|---|
| Democratic | Laura Richardson (incumbent) | 131,342 | 74.94 |
| Independent | Nicholas Dibs | 42,774 | 24.41 |
| Democratic | Peter Mathews (write-in) | 600 | 0.34 |
| Republican | June Pouesi (write-in) | 526 | 0.30 |
| Democratic | Lee Davis (write-in) | 10 | 0.01 |
| Total votes | | 175,252 | 100.00 |
| Turnout | | | 63.24 |
| Democratic hold | | | |

== District 38 ==
2008 California's 38th congressional district election
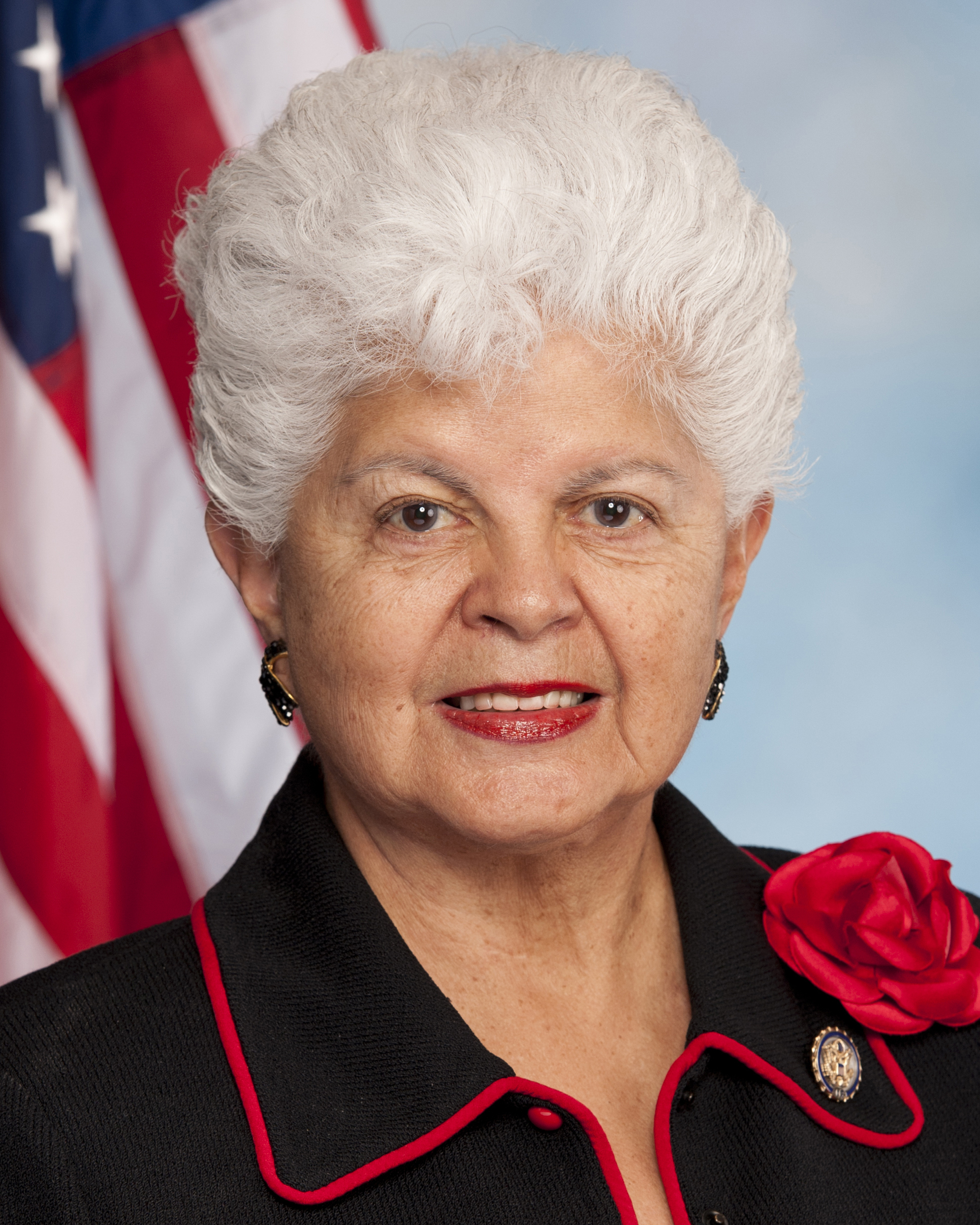

| Nominee | Grace Napolitano | Christopher Agrella |
| Party | Democratic | Libertarian |
| Popular vote | 130,211 | 29,113 |
| Percentage | 81.7% | 18.3% |
- County results Napolitano: 80–90%
U.S. Representative before election
Grace Napolitano
Democratic
Elected U.S. Representative
Grace Napolitano
Democratic

(map)

California's 38th congressional district has been represented by Democrat Grace Napolitano since 1999. Napolitano's heavily Democratic east Los Angeles-based district is a largely Hispanic one that includes Montebello, Pico Rivera, La Puente, and part of Norwalk.

- Race ranking and details from CQ Politics
- Campaign contributions from OpenSecrets

=== Predictions ===
| Source | Ranking | As of |
|---|---|---|
| The Cook Political Report | Safe D | November 6, 2008 |
| Rothenberg | Safe D | November 2, 2008 |
| Sabato's Crystal Ball | Safe D | November 6, 2008 |
| Real Clear Politics | Safe D | November 7, 2008 |
| CQ Politics | Safe D | November 6, 2008 |

California's 38th congressional district election, 2008
| Party | Candidate | Votes | % |
|---|---|---|---|
| Democratic | Grace Napolitano (incumbent) | 130,211 | 81.73 |
| Libertarian | Christopher Agrella | 29,113 | 18.27 |
| Total votes | | 159,324 | 100.00 |
| Turnout | | | 63.74 |
| Democratic hold | | | |

== District 39 ==
2008 California's 39th congressional district election
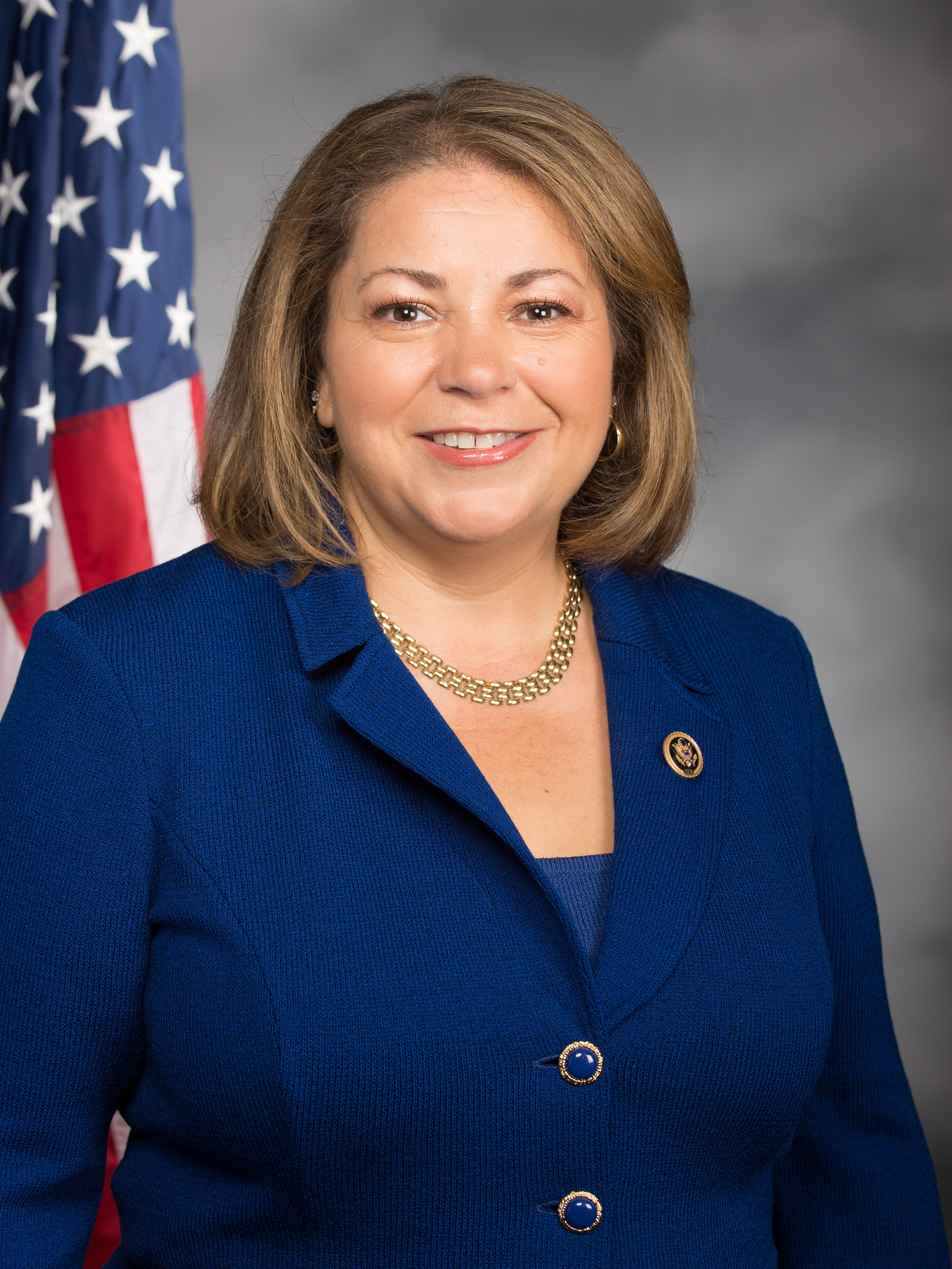

| Nominee | Linda Sánchez | Diane Lenning |
| Party | Democratic | Republican |
| Popular vote | 125,289 | 54,533 |
| Percentage | 69.7% | 30.3% |
- County results Sanchez: 60–70%
U.S. Representative before election
Linda Sánchez
Democratic
Elected U.S. Representative
Linda Sánchez
Democratic

(map)

- Race ranking and details from CQ Politics
- Campaign contributions from OpenSecrets

=== Predictions ===
| Source | Ranking | As of |
|---|---|---|
| The Cook Political Report | Safe D | November 6, 2008 |
| Rothenberg | Safe D | November 2, 2008 |
| Sabato's Crystal Ball | Safe D | November 6, 2008 |
| Real Clear Politics | Safe D | November 7, 2008 |
| CQ Politics | Safe D | November 6, 2008 |

California's 39th congressional district election, 2008
| Party | Candidate | Votes | % |
|---|---|---|---|
| Democratic | Linda Sánchez (incumbent) | 125,289 | 69.67 |
| Republican | Diane Lenning | 54,533 | 30.33 |
| Total votes | | 179,822 | 100.00 |
| Turnout | | | 68.28 |
| Democratic hold | | | |

== District 40 ==
2008 California's 40th congressional district election
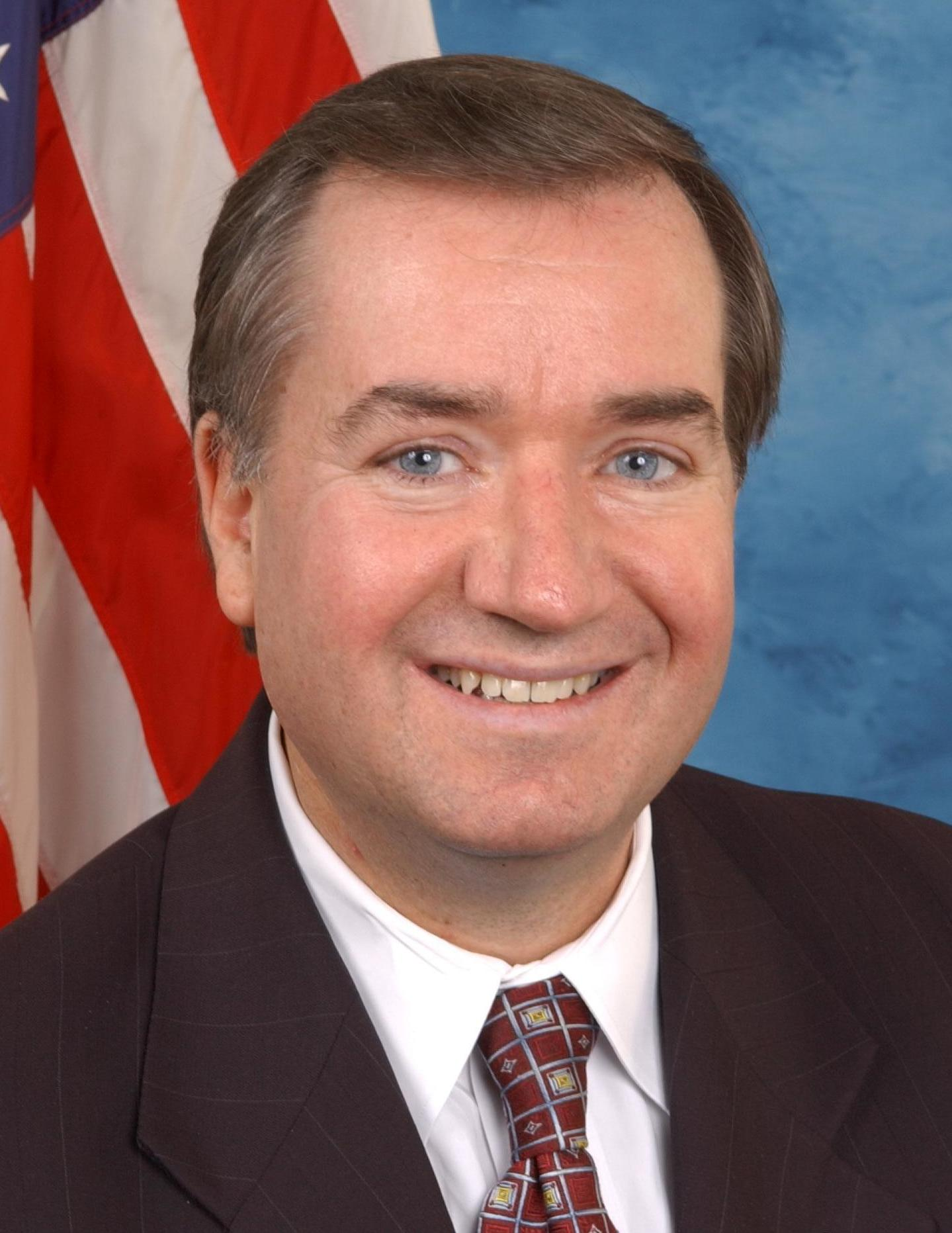

| Nominee | Ed Royce | Christina Avalos |
| Party | Republican | Democratic |
| Popular vote | 144,923 | 86,772 |
| Percentage | 62.5% | 37.5% |
- County results Royce: 60–70%
U.S. Representative before election
Ed Royce
Republican
Elected U.S. Representative
Ed Royce
Republican

(map)

- Race ranking and details from CQ Politics
- Campaign contributions from OpenSecrets

=== Predictions ===
| Source | Ranking | As of |
|---|---|---|
| The Cook Political Report | Safe R | November 6, 2008 |
| Rothenberg | Safe R | November 2, 2008 |
| Sabato's Crystal Ball | Safe R | November 6, 2008 |
| Real Clear Politics | Safe R | November 7, 2008 |
| CQ Politics | Safe R | November 6, 2008 |

California's 40th congressional district election, 2008
| Party | Candidate | Votes | % |
|---|---|---|---|
| Republican | Ed Royce (incumbent) | 144,923 | 62.55 |
| Democratic | Christina Avalos | 86,772 | 37.45 |
| Total votes | | 231,695 | 100.00 |
| Turnout | | | 67.40 |
| Republican hold | | | |

== District 41 ==
2008 California's 41st congressional district election
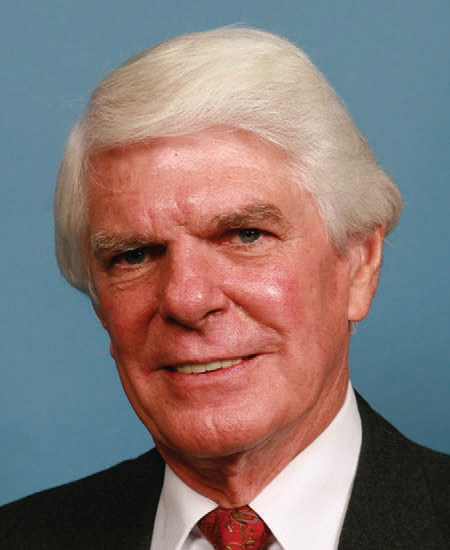

| Nominee | Jerry Lewis | Tim Prince |
| Party | Republican | Democratic |
| Popular vote | 159,486 | 99,214 |
| Percentage | 61.6% | 38.4% |
- County results Lewis: 50–60% 60–70%
U.S. Representative before election
Jerry Lewis
Republican
Elected U.S. Representative
Jerry Lewis
Republican

(map)

California's 41st congressional district has been represented by Republican Jerry Lewis since 1979. Lewis served as the chair of the House Appropriations Committee when Republicans controlled the House. Lewis, who will be 74 in 2008, has come under investigation for connections to the Copeland Lowery lobbying firm. In spite of speculation that he would retire, Lewis announced he would seek reelection on August 31. Bush won 62% here in 2004.

- Race ranking and details from CQ Politics
- Campaign contributions from OpenSecrets

=== Predictions ===
| Source | Ranking | As of |
|---|---|---|
| The Cook Political Report | Safe R | November 6, 2008 |
| Rothenberg | Safe R | November 2, 2008 |
| Sabato's Crystal Ball | Safe R | November 6, 2008 |
| Real Clear Politics | Safe R | November 7, 2008 |
| CQ Politics | Safe R | November 6, 2008 |

California's 41st congressional district election, 2008
| Party | Candidate | Votes | % |
|---|---|---|---|
| Republican | Jerry Lewis (incumbent) | 159,486 | 61.65 |
| Democratic | Tim Prince | 99,214 | 38.35 |
| Total votes | | 258,700 | 100.00 |
| Turnout | | | 71.43 |
| Republican hold | | | |

== District 42 ==
2008 California's 42nd congressional district election
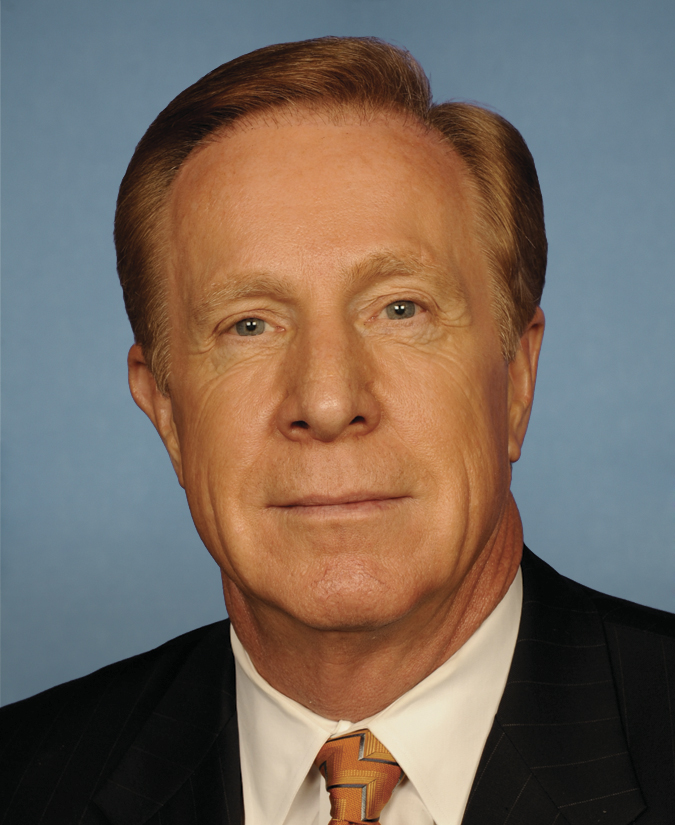

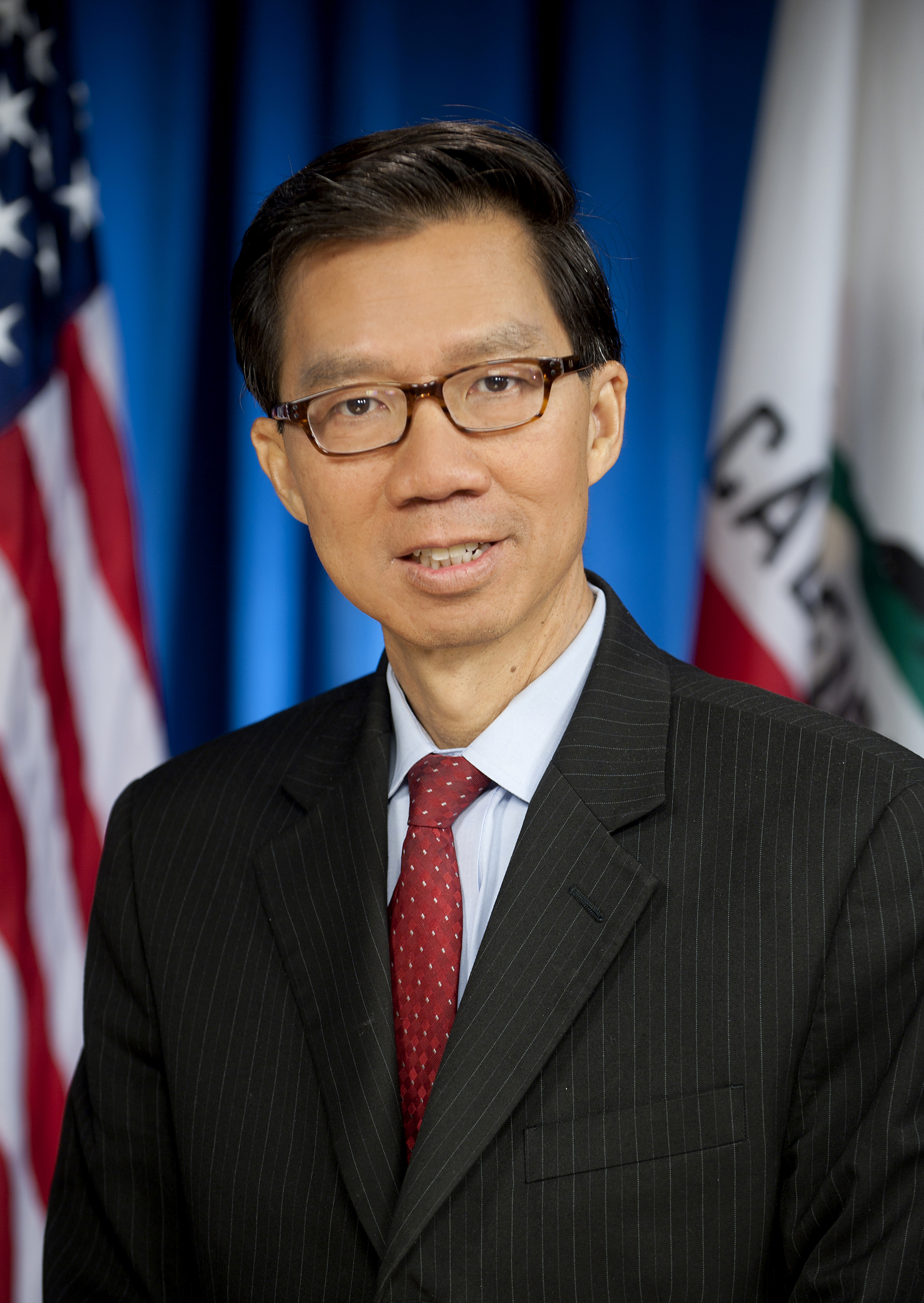
| Nominee | Gary Miller | Ed Chau |
| Party | Republican | Democratic |
| Popular vote | 158,404 | 104,909 |
| Percentage | 60.2% | 39.8% |
- County results Miller: 50–60% 60–70%
U.S. Representative before election
Gary Miller
Republican
Elected U.S. Representative
Gary Miller
Republican

(map)

California's 42nd congressional district is one of the most conservative districts in the state, and has been represented by Republican Gary Miller since 1999. Before the election, Miller suffered bad press, with four ex-aides accusing him of conflict-of-interest and using his position to profit from the sale of personal land holdings.

- Race ranking and details from CQ Politics
- Campaign contributions from OpenSecrets

=== Predictions ===
| Source | Ranking | As of |
|---|---|---|
| The Cook Political Report | Safe R | November 6, 2008 |
| Rothenberg | Safe R | November 2, 2008 |
| Sabato's Crystal Ball | Safe R | November 6, 2008 |
| Real Clear Politics | Safe R | November 7, 2008 |
| CQ Politics | Safe R | November 6, 2008 |

California's 42nd congressional district election, 2008
| Party | Candidate | Votes | % |
|---|---|---|---|
| Republican | Gary Miller (incumbent) | 158,404 | 60.16 |
| Democratic | Ed Chau | 104,909 | 39.84 |
| Total votes | | 263,313 | 100.00 |
| Turnout | | | 70.77 |
| Republican hold | | | |

== District 43 ==
2008 California's 43rd congressional district election
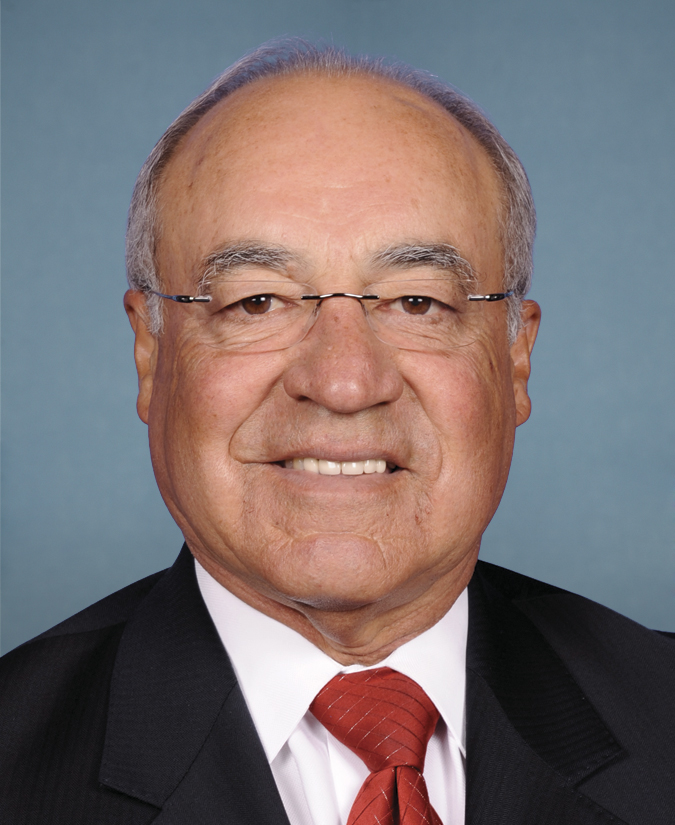

| Nominee | Joe Baca | John Roberts |
| Party | Democratic | Republican |
| Popular vote | 108,259 | 48,312 |
| Percentage | 69.1% | 30.9% |
- County results Baca: 60–70%
U.S. Representative before election
Joe Baca
Democratic
Elected U.S. Representative
Joe Baca
Democratic

(map)

- Race ranking and details from CQ Politics
- Campaign contributions from OpenSecrets

=== Predictions ===
| Source | Ranking | As of |
|---|---|---|
| The Cook Political Report | Safe D | November 6, 2008 |
| Rothenberg | Safe D | November 2, 2008 |
| Sabato's Crystal Ball | Safe D | November 6, 2008 |
| Real Clear Politics | Safe D | November 7, 2008 |
| CQ Politics | Safe D | November 6, 2008 |

California's 43rd congressional district election, 2008
| Party | Candidate | Votes | % |
|---|---|---|---|
| Democratic | Joe Baca (incumbent) | 108,259 | 69.14 |
| Republican | John Roberts | 48,312 | 30.86 |
| Total votes | | 156,571 | 100.00 |
| Turnout | | | 63.37 |
| Democratic hold | | | |

== District 44 ==
2008 California's 44th congressional district election
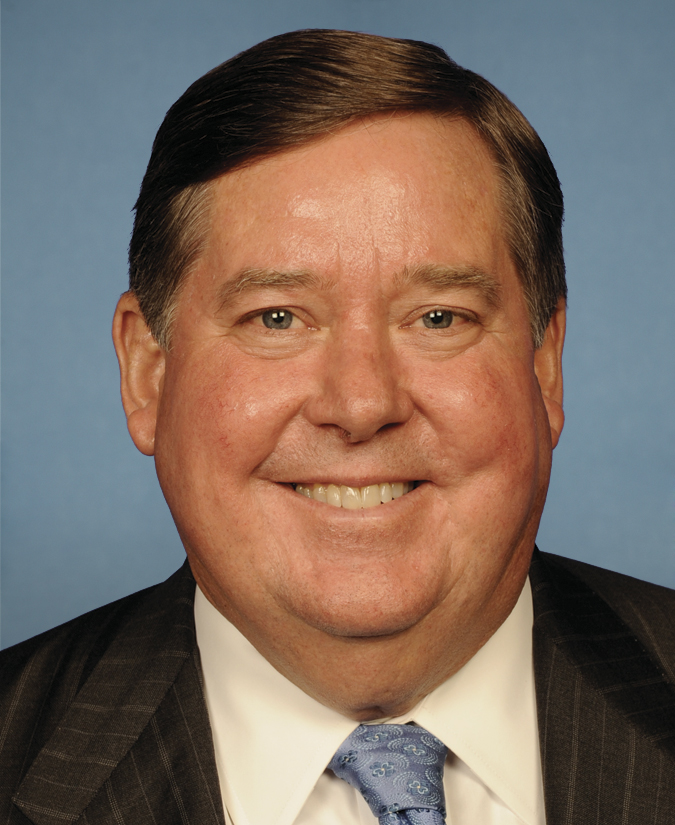

| Nominee | Ken Calvert | Bill Hedrick |
| Party | Republican | Democratic |
| Popular vote | 129,937 | 123,890 |
| Percentage | 51.2% | 48.8% |
- County results Calvert: 60–70% Hedrick: 50–60%
U.S. Representative before election
Ken Calvert
Republican
Elected U.S. Representative
Ken Calvert
Republican

(map)

- Race ranking and details from CQ Politics
- Campaign contributions from OpenSecrets

=== Predictions ===
| Source | Ranking | As of |
|---|---|---|
| The Cook Political Report | Safe R | November 6, 2008 |
| Rothenberg | Safe R | November 2, 2008 |
| Sabato's Crystal Ball | Safe R | November 6, 2008 |
| Real Clear Politics | Safe R | November 7, 2008 |
| CQ Politics | Safe R | November 6, 2008 |

California's 44th congressional district election, 2008
| Party | Candidate | Votes | % |
|---|---|---|---|
| Republican | Ken Calvert (incumbent) | 129,937 | 51.19 |
| Democratic | Bill Hedrick | 123,890 | 48.81 |
| Total votes | | 253,827 | 100.00 |
| Turnout | | | 72.61 |
| Republican hold | | | |

== District 45 ==
2008 California's 45th congressional district election
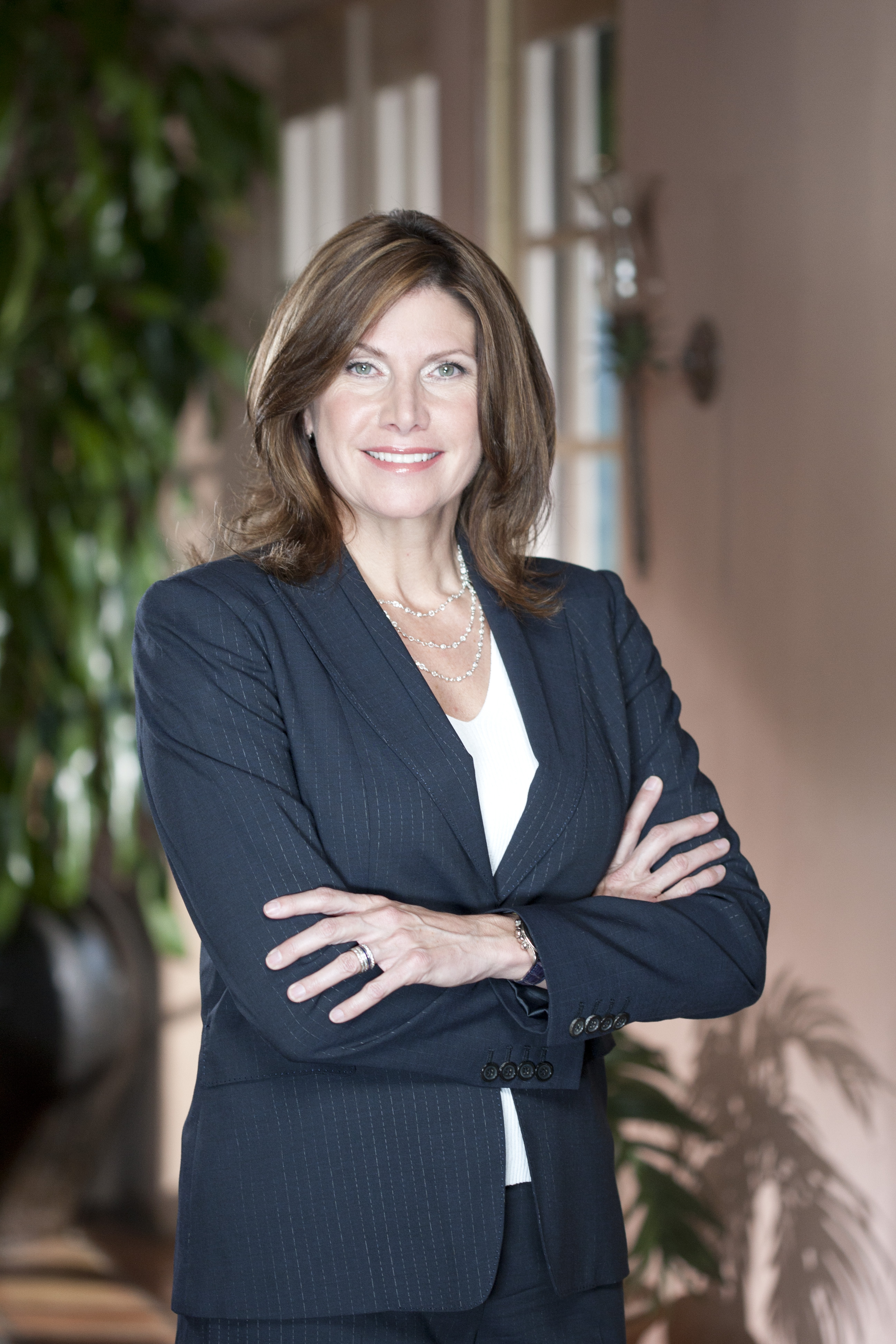

| Nominee | Mary Bono Mack | Julie Bornstein |
| Party | Republican | Democratic |
| Popular vote | 155,166 | 111,026 |
| Percentage | 58.3% | 41.7% |
- County results Mack: 50–60%
U.S. Representative before election
Mary Bono Mack
Republican
Elected U.S. Representative
Mary Bono Mack
Republican

(map)

- Race ranking and details from CQ Politics
- Campaign contributions from OpenSecrets

=== Predictions ===
| Source | Ranking | As of |
|---|---|---|
| The Cook Political Report | Likely R | November 6, 2008 |
| Rothenberg | Safe R | November 2, 2008 |
| Sabato's Crystal Ball | Safe R | November 6, 2008 |
| Real Clear Politics | Safe R | November 7, 2008 |
| CQ Politics | Safe R | November 6, 2008 |

California's 45th congressional district election, 2008
| Party | Candidate | Votes | % |
|---|---|---|---|
| Republican | Mary Bono Mack (incumbent) | 155,166 | 58.29 |
| Democratic | Julie Bornstein | 111,026 | 41.71 |
| Total votes | | 266,192 | 100.00 |
| Turnout | | | 74.36 |
| Republican hold | | | |

== District 46 ==
2008 California's 46th congressional district election
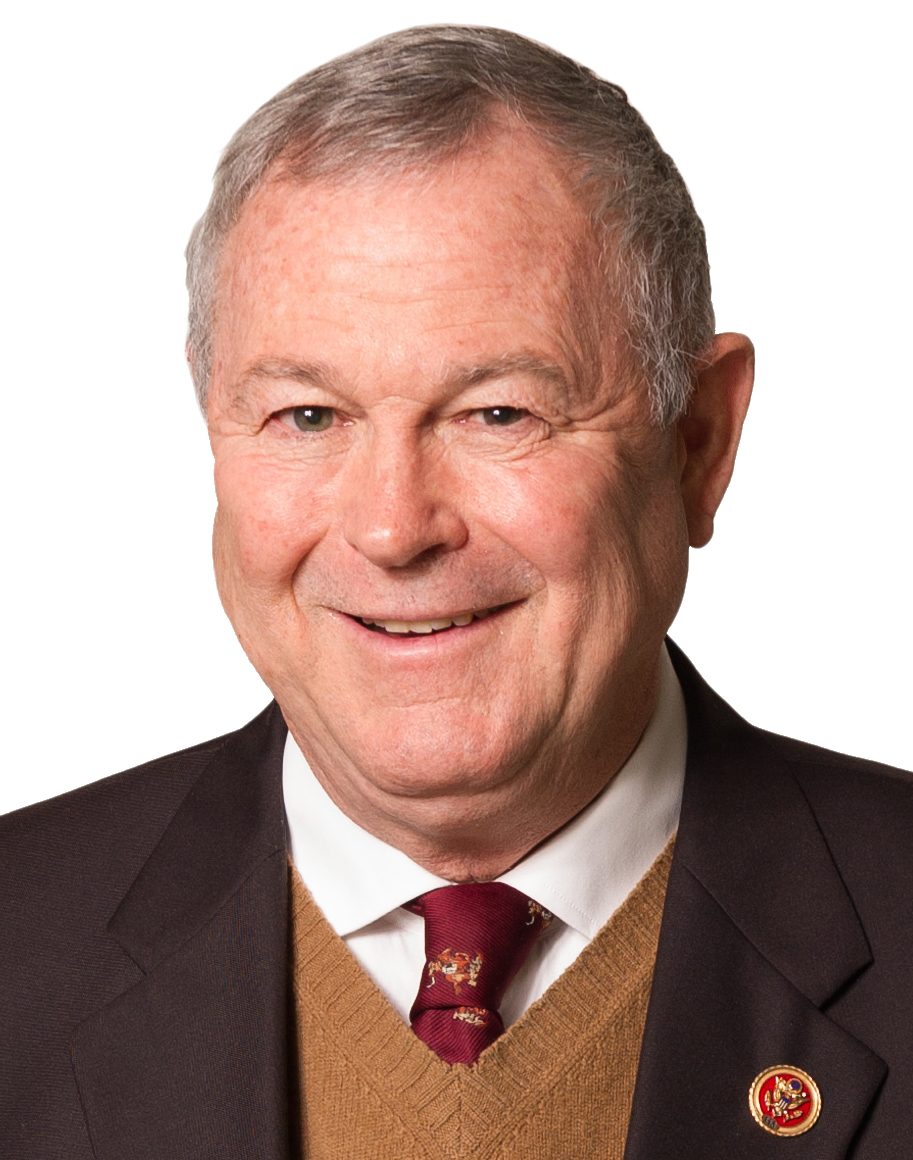

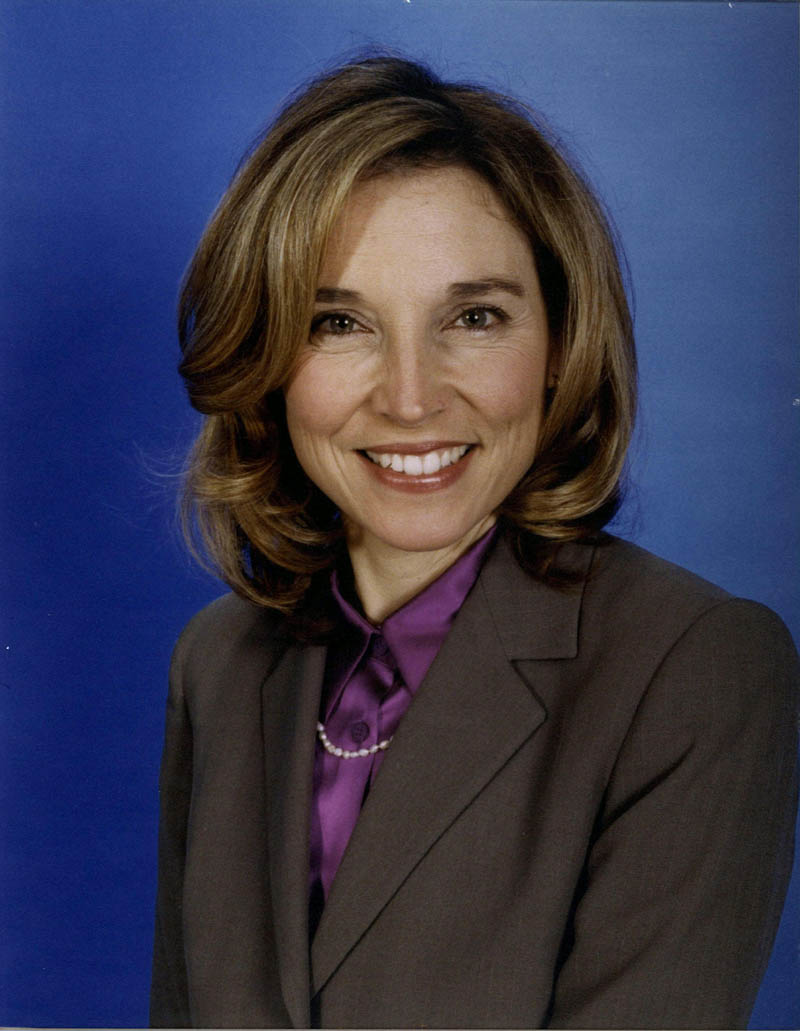
| Nominee | Dana Rohrabacher | Debbie Cook |
| Party | Republican | Democratic |
| Popular vote | 149,818 | 122,891 |
| Percentage | 52.5% | 43.1% |
- County results Rohrabacher: 50–60%
U.S. Representative before election
Dana Rohrabacher
Republican
Elected U.S. Representative
Dana Rohrabacher
Republican

(map)

Republican Dana Rohrabacher's district (which includes the Southern Channel Islands, Palos Verdes Peninsula, and parts of Orange County) has been a Republican stronghold in recent years. Huntington Beach mayor Debbie Cook was the (Democratic) challenger.

- Race ranking and details from CQ Politics
- Campaign contributions from OpenSecrets

=== Predictions ===
| Source | Ranking | As of |
|---|---|---|
| The Cook Political Report | Likely R | November 6, 2008 |
| Rothenberg | Likely R | November 2, 2008 |
| Sabato's Crystal Ball | Safe R | November 6, 2008 |
| Real Clear Politics | Safe R | November 7, 2008 |
| CQ Politics | Likely R | November 6, 2008 |

California's 46th congressional district election, 2008
| Party | Candidate | Votes | % |
|---|---|---|---|
| Republican | Dana Rohrabacher (incumbent) | 149,818 | 52.52 |
| Democratic | Debbie Cook | 122,891 | 43.08 |
| Green | Thomas Lash | 8,257 | 2.89 |
| Libertarian | Ernst Gasteiger | 4,311 | 1.51 |
| Total votes | | 285,277 | 100.00 |
| Turnout | | | 70.10 |
| Republican hold | | | |

== District 47 ==
2008 California's 47th congressional district election
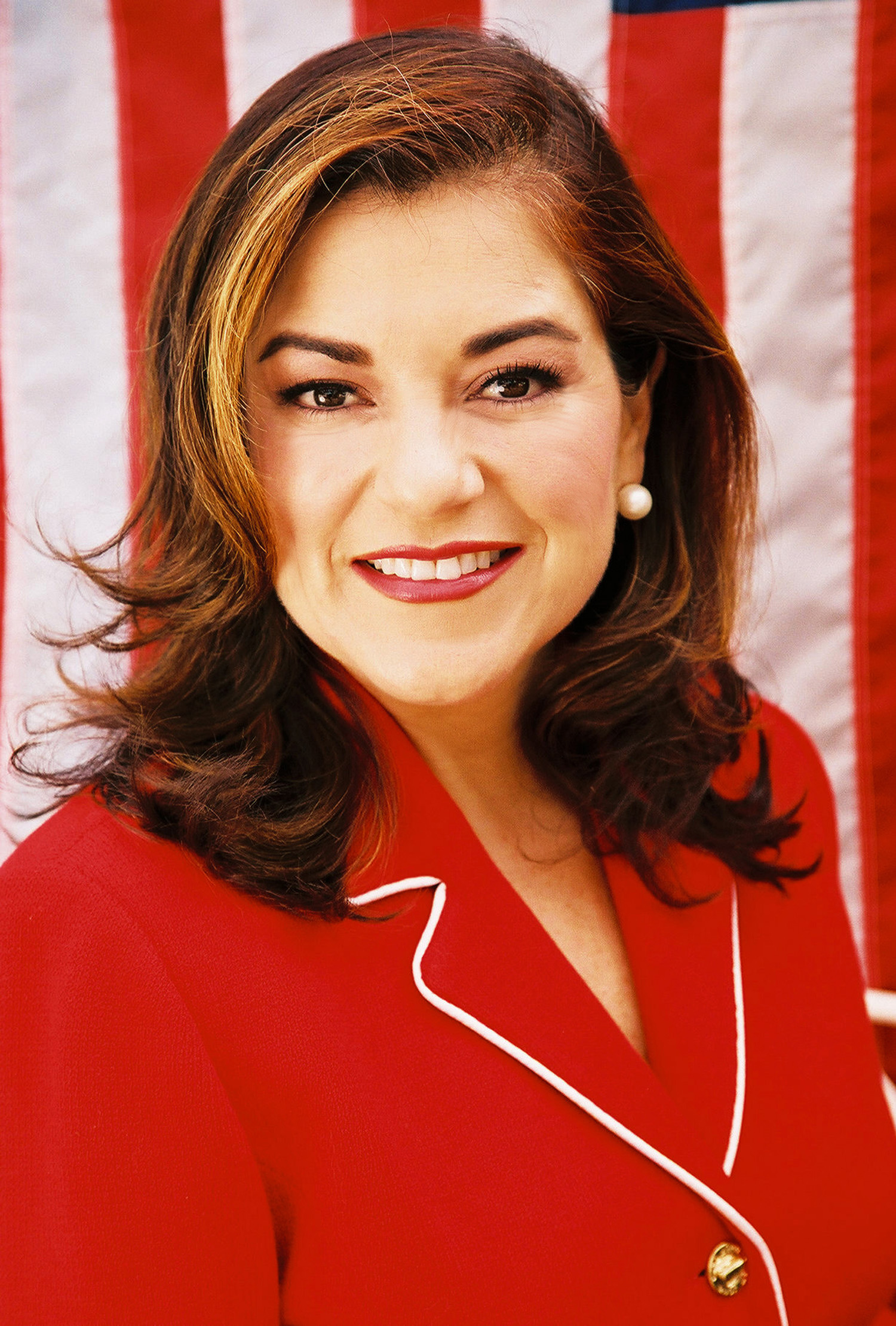

| Nominee | Loretta Sanchez | Rosemarie Avila | Robert Lauten |
| Party | Democratic | Republican | American Independent |
| Popular vote | 85,878 | 31,432 | 6,274 |
| Percentage | 69.5% | 25.4% | 5.1% |
- County results Sanchez: 60–70%
U.S. Representative before election
Loretta Sanchez
Democratic
Elected U.S. Representative
Loretta Sanchez
Democratic

(map)

California's 47th congressional district was represented by Democrat Loretta Sanchez since 1997. Sanchez won 62% of the vote in a district that barely went to George W. Bush with around 50% to 49% in 2004, which could have resulted in an opening for Republicans, who had not recruited a strong candidate in years. This year, Republican Rosie Avila hoped to oust Sanchez. However, Sanchez's district is located in one of the more Democratic areas of Orange County, including Anaheim and Santa Ana, and Al Gore won this district in 2000 by a comfortable margin.

- Race ranking and details from CQ Politics
- Campaign contributions from OpenSecrets

=== Predictions ===
| Source | Ranking | As of |
|---|---|---|
| The Cook Political Report | Safe D | November 6, 2008 |
| Rothenberg | Safe D | November 2, 2008 |
| Sabato's Crystal Ball | Safe D | November 6, 2008 |
| Real Clear Politics | Safe D | November 7, 2008 |
| CQ Politics | Safe D | November 6, 2008 |

California's 47th congressional district election, 2008
| Party | Candidate | Votes | % |
|---|---|---|---|
| Democratic | Loretta Sanchez (incumbent) | 85,878 | 69.49 |
| Republican | Rosemarie Avila | 31,432 | 25.43 |
| American Independent | Robert Lauten | 6,274 | 5.08 |
| Total votes | | 123,584 | 100.00 |
| Turnout | | | 57.01 |
| Democratic hold | | | |

== District 48 ==
2008 California's 48th congressional district election
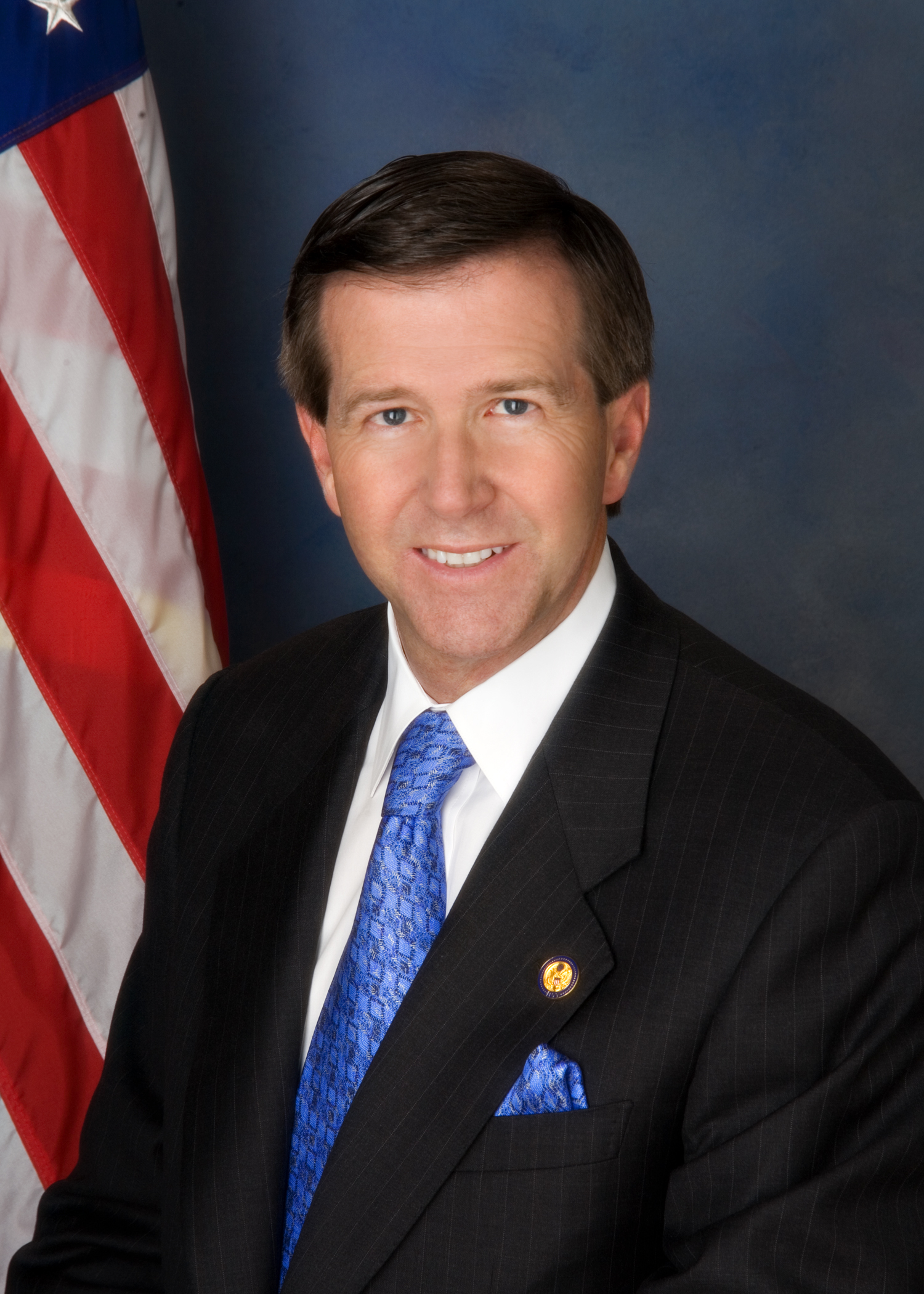

| Nominee | John Campbell | Steve Young |
| Party | Republican | Democratic |
| Popular vote | 171,658 | 125,537 |
| Percentage | 55.6% | 40.7% |
- County results Campbell: 50–60%
U.S. Representative before election
John Campbell
Republican
Elected U.S. Representative
John Campbell
Republican

(map)

- Race ranking and details from CQ Politics
- Campaign contributions from OpenSecrets

=== Predictions ===
| Source | Ranking | As of |
|---|---|---|
| The Cook Political Report | Safe R | November 6, 2008 |
| Rothenberg | Safe R | November 2, 2008 |
| Sabato's Crystal Ball | Safe R | November 6, 2008 |
| Real Clear Politics | Safe R | November 7, 2008 |
| CQ Politics | Safe R | November 6, 2008 |

California's 48th congressional district election, 2008
| Party | Candidate | Votes | % |
|---|---|---|---|
| Republican | John Campbell (incumbent) | 171,658 | 55.61 |
| Democratic | Steve Young | 125,537 | 40.67 |
| Libertarian | Don Patterson | 11,507 | 3.73 |
| Total votes | | 308,702 | 100.00 |
| Turnout | | | 70.17 |
| Republican hold | | | |

== District 49 ==
2008 California's 49th congressional district election
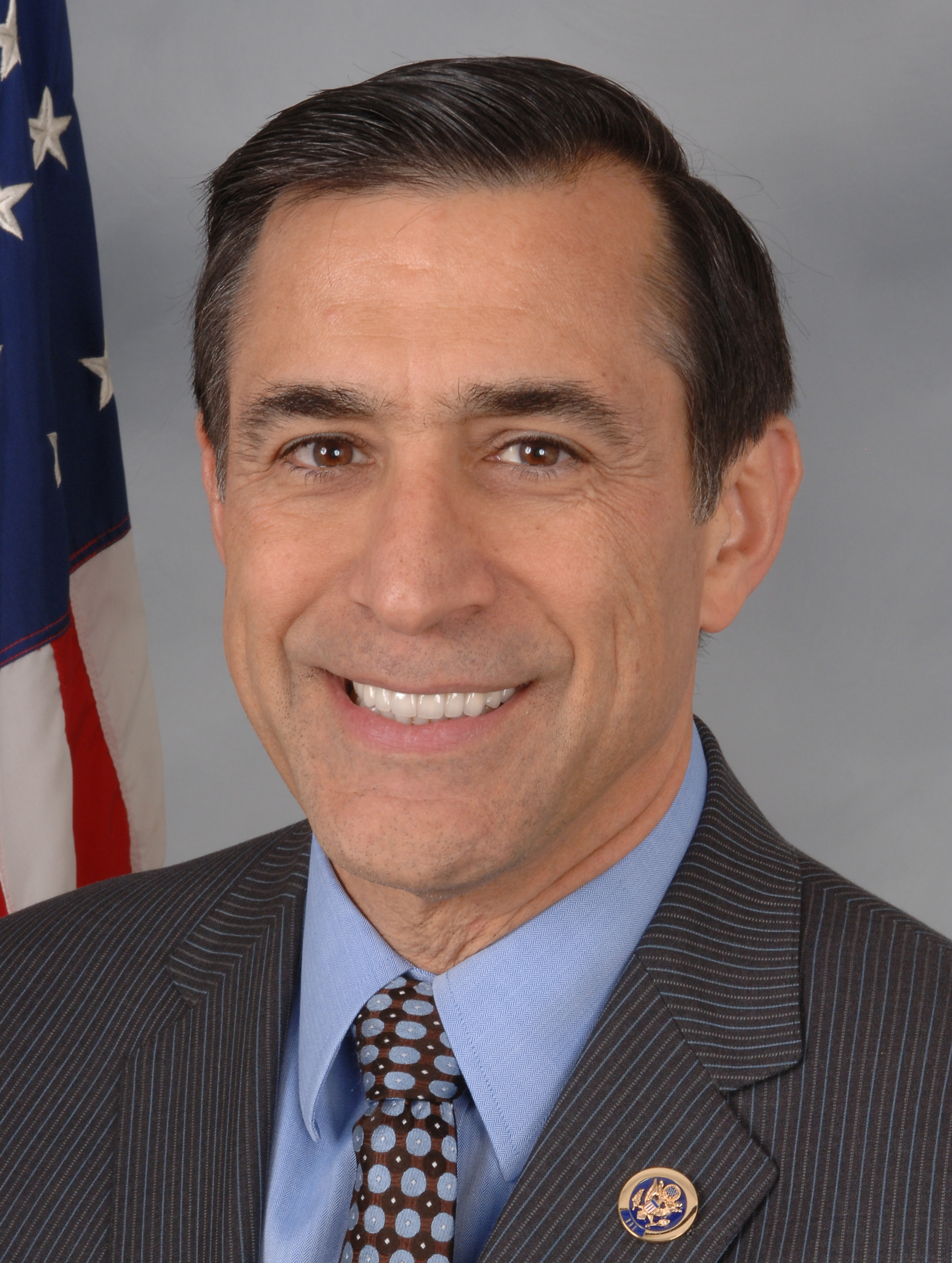

| Nominee | Darrell Issa | Robert Hamilton |
| Party | Republican | Democratic |
| Popular vote | 140,300 | 90,138 |
| Percentage | 58.3% | 37.5% |
- County results Issa: 50–60%
U.S. Representative before election
Darrell Issa
Republican
Elected U.S. Representative
Darrell Issa
Republican

(map)

- Race ranking and details from CQ Politics
- Campaign contributions from OpenSecrets

=== Predictions ===
| Source | Ranking | As of |
|---|---|---|
| The Cook Political Report | Safe R | November 6, 2008 |
| Rothenberg | Safe R | November 2, 2008 |
| Sabato's Crystal Ball | Safe R | November 6, 2008 |
| Real Clear Politics | Safe R | November 7, 2008 |
| CQ Politics | Safe R | November 6, 2008 |

California's 49th congressional district election, 2008
| Party | Candidate | Votes | % |
|---|---|---|---|
| Republican | Darrell Issa (incumbent) | 140,300 | 58.30 |
| Democratic | Robert Hamilton | 90,138 | 37.45 |
| Libertarian | Lars Grossmith | 10,232 | 4.25 |
| Total votes | | 240,670 | 100.00 |
| Turnout | | | 76.19 |
| Republican hold | | | |

== District 50 ==
2008 California's 50th congressional district election
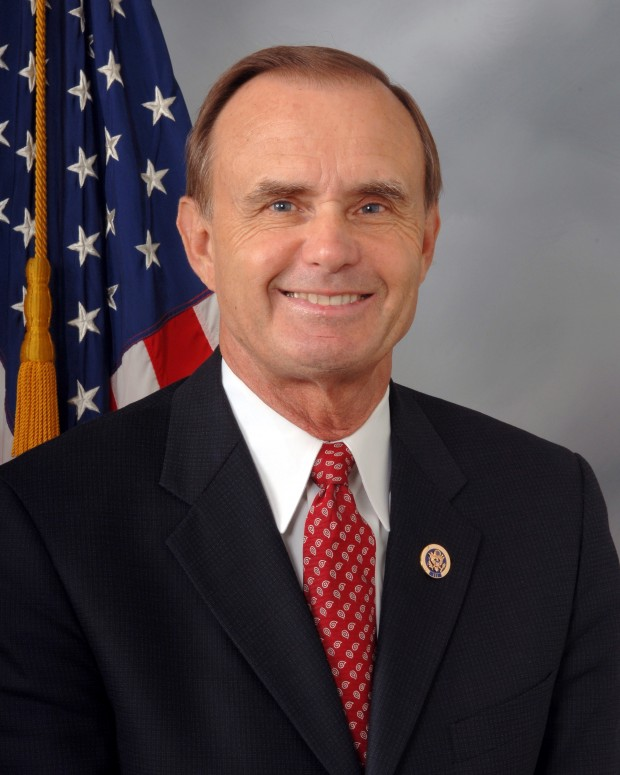

| Nominee | Brian Bilbray | Nick Leibham |
| Party | Republican | Democratic |
| Popular vote | 157,502 | 141,635 |
| Percentage | 50.2% | 45.2% |
- County results Bilbray: 50–60%
U.S. Representative before election
Brian Bilbray
Republican
Elected U.S. Representative
Brian Bilbray
Republican

(map)

California's 50th congressional district has been represented by Republican Brian Bilbray since 2006. Bilbray won 53% of the vote in a Republican-leaning district north of San Diego that was previously represented by the scandal-plagued Duke Cunningham (R). George W. Bush won 54% here in 2004. Nick Leibham won against Cheryl Ede in the Democratic primary. CQ Politics forecasts the race as 'Safe Republican'.

- Race ranking and details from CQ Politics
- Campaign contributions from OpenSecrets
- Bilbray (R-i) vs Leibham (D) graph of collected poll results from Pollster.com

=== Predictions ===
| Source | Ranking | As of |
|---|---|---|
| The Cook Political Report | Lean R | November 6, 2008 |
| Rothenberg | Safe R | November 2, 2008 |
| Sabato's Crystal Ball | Lean R | November 6, 2008 |
| Real Clear Politics | Safe R | November 7, 2008 |
| CQ Politics | Likely R | November 6, 2008 |

California's 50th congressional district election, 2008
| Party | Candidate | Votes | % |
|---|---|---|---|
| Republican | Brian Bilbray (incumbent) | 157,502 | 50.24 |
| Democratic | Nick Leibham | 141,635 | 45.18 |
| Libertarian | Wayne Dunlap | 14,365 | 4.58 |
| Total votes | | 313,502 | 100.00 |
| Turnout | | | 80.15 |
| Republican hold | | | |

== District 51 ==
2008 California's 51st congressional district election
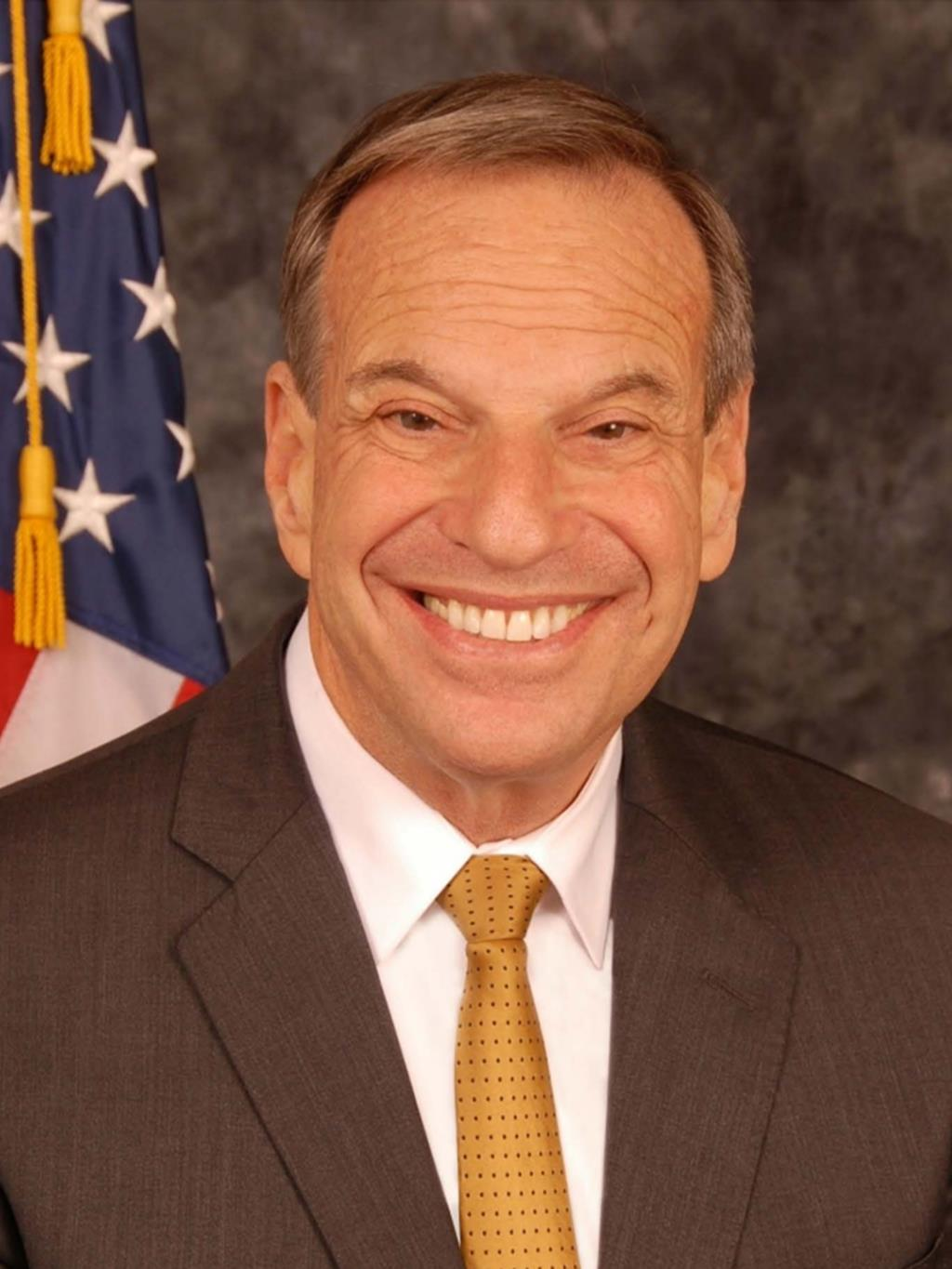

| Nominee | Bob Filner | David Joy |
| Party | Democratic | Republican |
| Popular vote | 148,281 | 49,345 |
| Percentage | 72.8% | 24.2% |
- County results Filner: 70–80%
U.S. Representative before election
Bob Filner
Democratic
Elected U.S. Representative
Bob Filner
Democratic

(map)

The congressional district has been held by Bob Filner, who formerly represented the 50th, since its inception following the 1992 redistricting. The district was redrawn following the 2000 census, creating a gerrymandered district boundary. Democratic incumbent Bob Filner of San Diego is seeking reelection and is being challenged by Republican businessman David Lee Joy of Spring Valley. The Libertarian candidate is musician and software systems engineer Dan "Frodo" Litwin of San Diego.

- Race ranking and details from CQ Politics
- Campaign contributions from OpenSecrets

=== Predictions ===
| Source | Ranking | As of |
|---|---|---|
| The Cook Political Report | Safe D | November 6, 2008 |
| Rothenberg | Safe D | November 2, 2008 |
| Sabato's Crystal Ball | Safe D | November 6, 2008 |
| Real Clear Politics | Safe D | November 7, 2008 |
| CQ Politics | Safe D | November 6, 2008 |

California's 51st congressional district election, 2008
| Party | Candidate | Votes | % |
|---|---|---|---|
| Democratic | Bob Filner (incumbent) | 148,281 | 72.75 |
| Republican | David Joy | 49,345 | 24.21 |
| Libertarian | Dan Litwin | 6,199 | 3.04 |
| Total votes | | 203,825 | 100.00 |
| Turnout | | | 69.06 |
| Democratic hold | | | |

== District 52 ==
2008 California's 52nd congressional district election
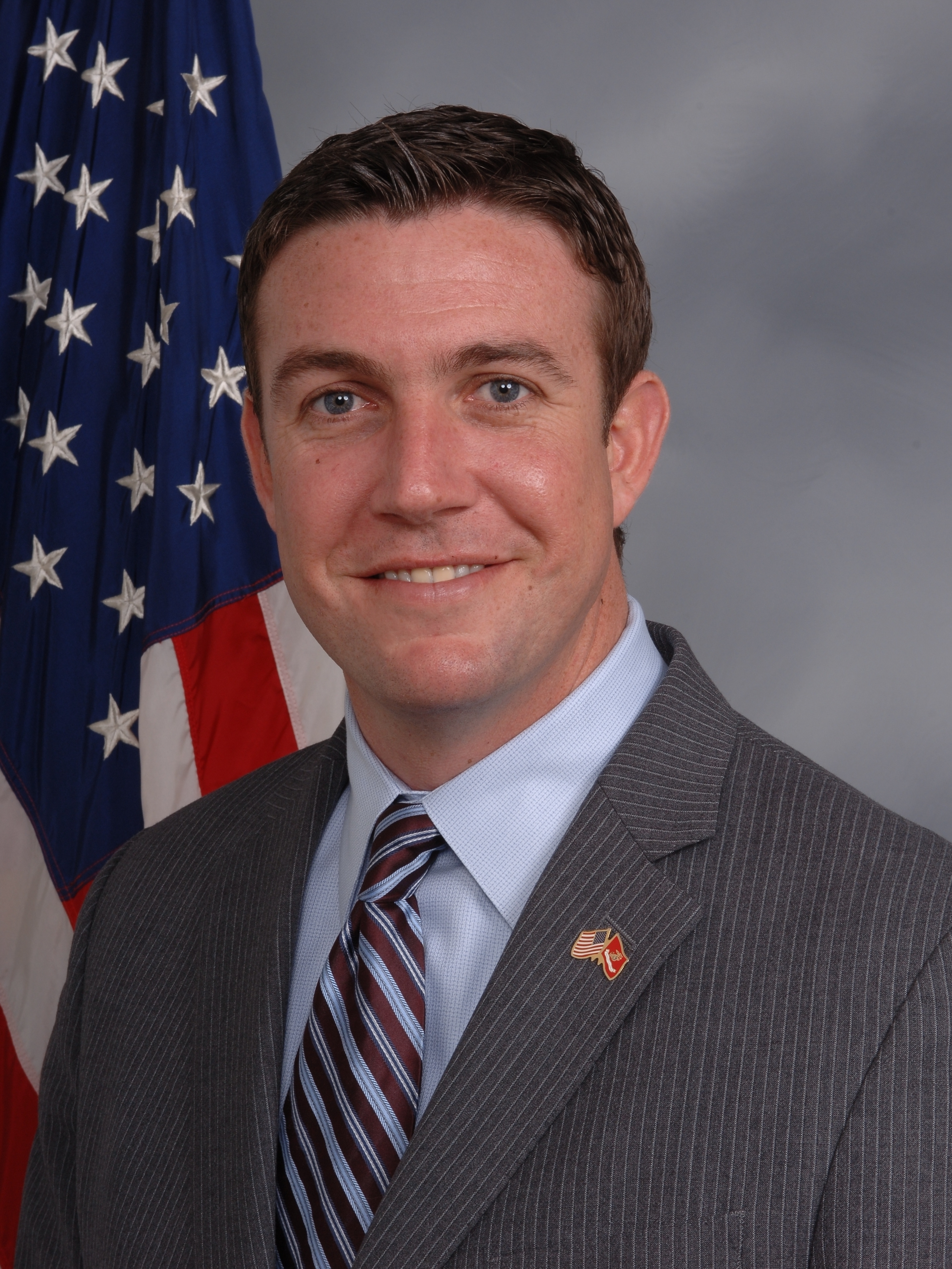

| Nominee | Duncan D. Hunter | Mike Lumpkin |
| Party | Republican | Democratic |
| Popular vote | 160,724 | 111,051 |
| Percentage | 56.4% | 39.0% |
- County results Hunter: 50–60%
U.S. Representative before election
Duncan Hunter
Republican
Elected U.S. Representative
Duncan D. Hunter
Republican

(map)

This race is for an open seat, being vacated by former Republican presidential candidate Duncan Hunter. Both Democratic and Republican candidates are OIF veterans. The Libertarian candidate is 2002 congressional candidate Mike Benoit.

- Race ranking and details from CQ Politics
- Campaign contributions from OpenSecrets

=== Predictions ===
| Source | Ranking | As of |
|---|---|---|
| The Cook Political Report | Safe R | November 6, 2008 |
| Rothenberg | Safe R | November 2, 2008 |
| Sabato's Crystal Ball | Safe R | November 6, 2008 |
| Real Clear Politics | Safe R | November 7, 2008 |
| CQ Politics | Safe R | November 6, 2008 |

California's 52nd congressional district election, 2008
| Party | Candidate | Votes | % |
|---|---|---|---|
| Republican | Duncan D. Hunter | 160,724 | 56.37 |
| Democratic | Mike Lumpkin | 111,051 | 38.95 |
| Libertarian | Michael Benoit | 13,316 | 4.67 |
| Independent | Joseph Ryan (write-in) | 47 | 0.02 |
| Total votes | | 285,138 | 100.00 |
| Turnout | | | 79.48 |
| Republican hold | | | |

== District 53 ==
2008 California's 53rd congressional district election
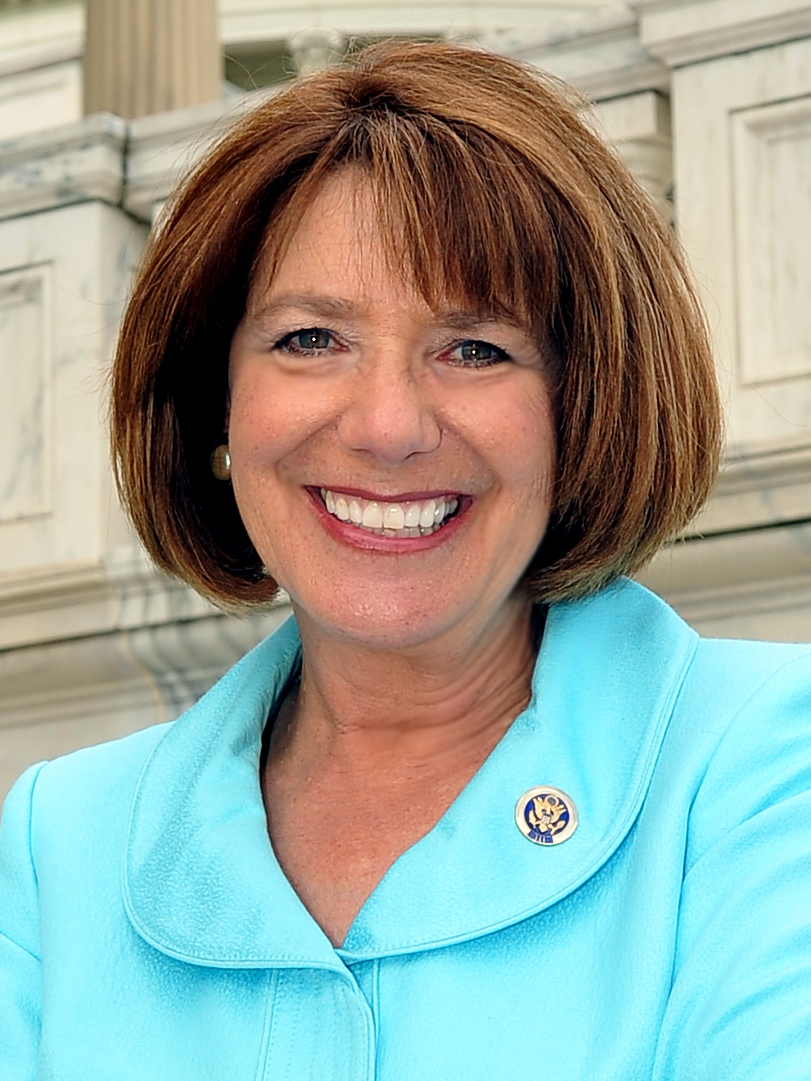

| Nominee | Susan Davis | Michael Crimmins |
| Party | Democratic | Republican |
| Popular vote | 161,315 | 64,658 |
| Percentage | 68.5% | 27.4% |
- County results Davis: 60–70%
U.S. Representative before election
Susan Davis
Democratic
Elected U.S. Representative
Susan Davis
Democratic

(map)

- Race ranking and details from CQ Politics
- Campaign contributions from OpenSecrets

=== Predictions ===
| Source | Ranking | As of |
|---|---|---|
| The Cook Political Report | Safe D | November 6, 2008 |
| Rothenberg | Safe D | November 2, 2008 |
| Sabato's Crystal Ball | Safe D | November 6, 2008 |
| Real Clear Politics | Safe D | November 7, 2008 |
| CQ Politics | Safe D | November 6, 2008 |

California's 53rd congressional district election, 2008
| Party | Candidate | Votes | % |
|---|---|---|---|
| Democratic | Susan Davis (incumbent) | 161,315 | 68.49 |
| Republican | Michael Crimmins | 64,658 | 27.45 |
| Libertarian | Edward Teyssier | 9,569 | 4.06 |
| Total votes | | 235,542 | 100.00 |
| Turnout | | | 72.72 |
| Democratic hold | | | |
