= Bob King (labor leader) =

Trade union leader

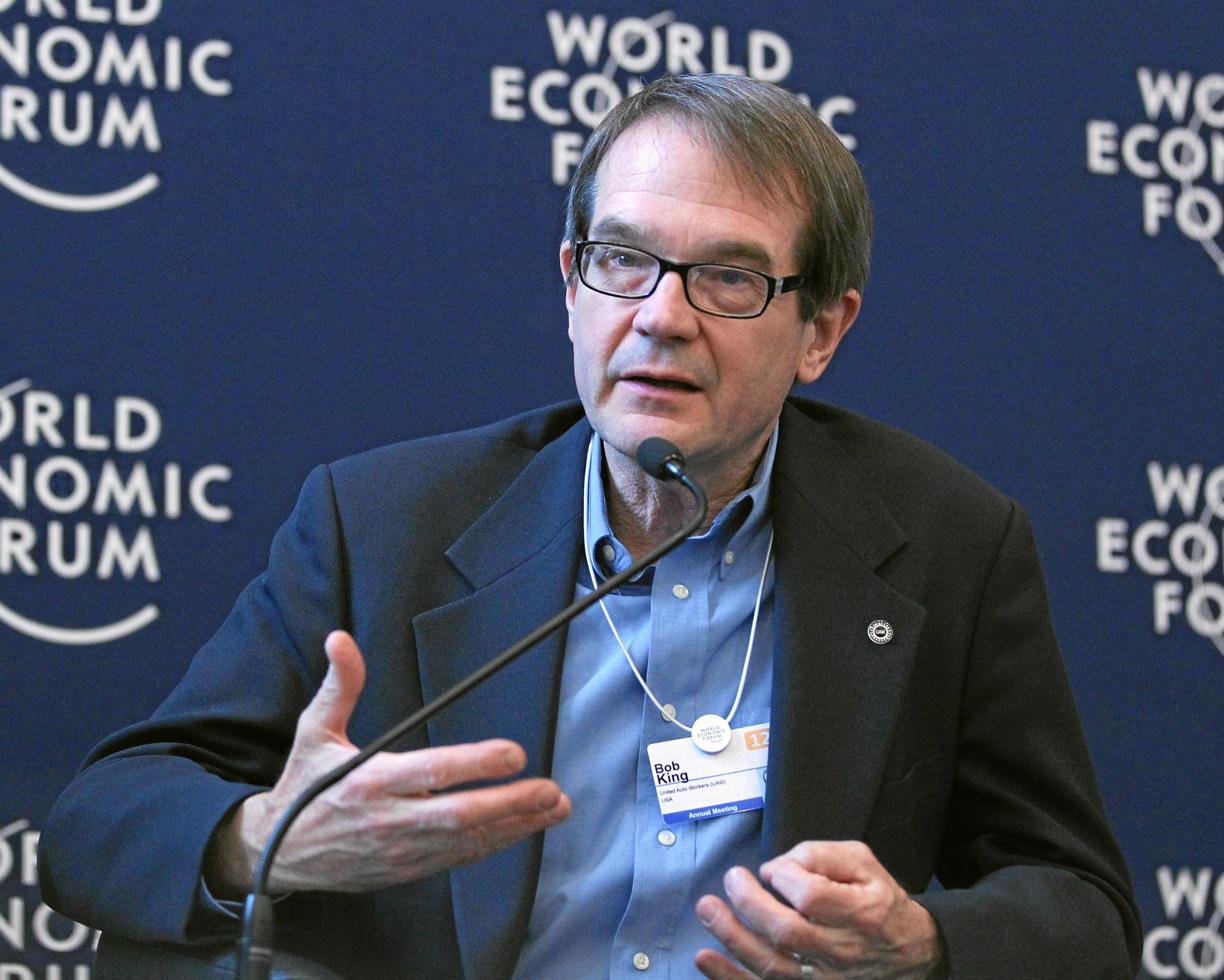
- King during the WEF 2012

Personal details
- Born: August 18, 1946 (age 80) Michigan, U.S.
- Party: Democratic
- Education: University of Michigan (BA); University of Detroit (JD)

Military service
- Branch/service: United States Army
- Years of service: 1968–1970

Robert Thompson King (born August 18, 1946) is an American lawyer and labor union activist and leader. He was elected president of the United Auto Workers (UAW) on June 15, 2010. His term of office ended in June 2014, and King announced his retirement, being succeeded by Dennis Williams as head of the UAW.

== Early life and education ==
Bob King was born in Michigan in 1946. His father, William J. King, Sr. was director of industrial relations at Ford Motor Company. He graduated from University of Detroit Jesuit High School in 1964.

King was raised as a Catholic but later became an Episcopalian. He attended College of the Holy Cross in Worcester, Massachusetts, and studied religion and philosophy before transferring to the University of Michigan. He graduated from Michigan with a bachelor's degree in political science in 1968. While in college, he worked during the summer at automobile assembly plants owned by General Motors and Chrysler. From 1968 to 1970, King served in the United States Army in South Korea.

King earned a Juris Doctor from the University of Detroit Law School in 1973.

== Career ==
King was employed full-time by Ford in 1970, taking a position in the Detroit Parts Depot where he became a member of UAW Local 600. He became an electrician's apprentice in 1972.

=== Union leadership ===
Bob King rose steadily and quickly in the leadership of Local 600. Local 600 (which represented workers at the gigantic Ford River Rouge Complex) was once the largest local union in the UAW and one of the largest local unions in the world, and had a long history of being one of the most liberal unions in the UAW. King was elected vice president of Local 600 in 1981, and president of the 17,000-member local in 1984. After winning re-election in 1987, King was named chair of the UAW-Ford Negotiating Committee, which bargained the company-wide master contract at Ford Motor Company. He bargained with Ford alongside future UAW president Stephen Yokich.

While president of Local 600, King expanded the union's membership into areas outside the automotive industry. In the 1980s, he led Local 600 in organizing 1,000 health care workers. He served as the chair of the UAW constitutional amendments committee at the 1983 and 1986 UAW conventions.

In June 1989, King was elected to the first of what would become three three-year terms as Director of Region 1A, a UAW administrative unit that covered most of Monroe, Washtenaw, and Wayne counties in Michigan. In 1990, he helped co-found and later co-chaired the Labor/Management Council for Economic Renewal, a non-profit organization made up of small businesses and local unions which exchanged information on best business practices.

King ran for UAW vice president in 1994, but did not win. During the 1995-1997 Detroit newspaper strike, King engaged in acts of civil disobedience and was arrested three times between 1996 and 1997.

==== UAW organizing efforts ====
In November 1997, King was assigned to oversee the union's National Organizing Department, a position created especially for him. UAW members approved making the position an elected vice president in June 1998, and King was elected that year. It was the first new vice presidency created in many years. During his four-year tenure in this latter position, King pushed the UAW to organize retail workers at Kmart, casino workers; state, county, and local government employees; and graduate student teaching and research assistants. Yokich defended King's outreach to these nontraditional constituencies of the UAW. King also established six regional organizing centers to help devolve responsibility for organizing closer to the worksite. By November 2000, he had led organizational drives which added about 50,000 new members to the union. By 2001, more than 22,000 state government workers in Michigan belonged to the UAW, as did some 15,000 graduate student workers. More than 20,000 of the 60,000 new members the UAW organized between 2002 and 2006 worked outside the automotive industry. Under his leadership, the UAW organized another 6,000 new members between 2006 and 2009. But his organizing drives also saw some major setbacks, such as when Nissan workers in Tennessee rejected UAW representation 2-to-1 in what was seen as a major setback for the union in its Southern organizing effort. Another loss came at Freightliner in North Carolina, and a major organizing effort at Mercedes-Benz never resulted in an election. The union did make organizing headway among auto parts suppliers, however.

During his tenure at the head of the UAW National Organizing Department, King extensively utilized card check, employer neutrality agreements, and collective bargaining clauses that provided for card check, employer neutrality, and/or expedited representation elections overseen by a neutral third party in plants newly opened by the employer. The UAW's aggressive use of these types of agreements led to two challenges before the National Labor Relations Board (NLRB). Workers at two companies organized by the UAW under card-check and neutrality agreements, Metaldyne and Dana Corporation, sought to have the UAW ousted as the labor representative at their respective plants. The NLRB consolidated the two cases, and in Dana Corporation, 351 NLRB No. 28 (September 29, 2007), the board significantly amended its existing policy so that, if an employer voluntarily recognizes the union a card check agreement, workers do not have to wait the required 45 days before petitioning the NLRB for decertification of the union. The decision was declared highly significant by both right-to-work advocates and labor unions, even though it only applied to future card check campaigns and did not affect the workers at Dana Corp. or Metaldyne.

King won re-election as vice president in 2002. In addition to his organizing duties, he was also appointed head of the UAW's Competitive Shop/Independents, Parts and Suppliers (IPS) Department, which assisted members and local unions in the auto parts and automotive supply industries.

King was elected to a third term as vice president in 2006. Under UAW rules, vice presidents are appointed to run departments of the union only after they have been re-elected (which prevents candidates for campaigning based on the fact that they will run this department or that one). King was in the running to oversee both the General Motors division and the Ford division, but was appointed by President Gettelfinger to lead the Ford unit. Newly elected Vice President Terry Thurman replaced King as head of the National Organizing Department, and Vice President Jimmy Settles replaced him as head of the IPS department.

==== Negotiator with Ford during automotive crisis ====
King confronted major financial crises at Ford Motor Co. during his leadership of the Ford Department, and negotiated several agreements with the automaker during a three-year period. King adopted a much more conciliatory tone toward Ford in his first public speech as head of the department. In August 2006, he led negotiations which led to Ford offering its unionized hourly employees buyouts worth tens of thousands of dollars per employee. A year later, he led the team which renegotiated the union's four-year collective bargaining agreement with Ford. The press called the negotiations "historic" because the company agreed not to close some of its plants, promised to invest in its remaining plants to ensure they will remain open, was permitted to establish a two-tier wage system (which established a much smaller $14-an-hour wage for new hires), and moved $22 billion in retiree health care obligations to a new union-run voluntary employee beneficiary association (VEBA). Members of the UAW voted overwhelmingly to ratify the agreement, 79 percent to 21 percent.

With the onset of the automotive industry crisis of 2008–2010, however, King was forced to go back to the bargaining table in an attempt to help save Ford Motor Co. from bankruptcy. King helped negotiate another wave of buyouts in January 2008. But the total number of workers taking the buyouts were only half the 8,000 workers Ford had hoped for (largely because workers worried they would not find employment in the bad job market). Nonetheless, King had negotiated contracts which had helped Ford cut 40 percent of its workforce since 2005. The UAW agreed to more buyouts in September 2008. In February 2009, King led the UAW team in negotiating a historic agreement which allowed Ford to make up to 50 percent of its required payment into the VEBA using common stock in lieu of cash. The agreement also froze wages, cut or eliminated non-base-wage cash bonuses, eliminated pay for laid-off workers, and required workers to take a two-week unpaid furlough or give up their matching pension contribution.

==== Run for president of the UAW ====
In the mid-1980s, King was being called one of the "bright young hopes for the future" and a "militant ... up-and comer" by the press. For expanding the union's membership base outside the automotive industry, he was called a "leader to watch in the coming decade", and frequently mentioned as a possible successor to UAW President Stephen Yokich. King appeared to be setting up for a run in 2002 when he began criticizing retiring UAW President Stephen Yokich for being too friendly with employers and creating a strong union bureaucracy rather than a strong union. But in November 2001, Ron Gettelfinger announced he was a candidate for president of the union, and King ran for re-election on Gettelfinger's slate.

Gettelfinger announced in March 2009 that he would not seek a third term as UAW president, leading some news outlets to declare King one of his possible successors. Shortly thereafter, King began stepping up his criticism of the three largest American automakers. He had particularly harsh words for General Motors, because it took aid from the federal government and yet still closed plants and because it said it would import vehicles from overseas to meet U.S. demand.

As King considered running for the presidency of the UAW, Ford asked for a third round of concessionary negotiations in May 2009. Ford Motor Co. was worried that General Motors and Chrysler had won largers concessions from the UAW, concessions which were not important now but which might give these automakers a competitive advantage in the future. King refused to negotiate immediately, and did not begin talking with Ford executives until August 2009. During these talks, Ford sought changes in work rules, a ban on strikes during the life of the contract, and the imposition of yet another two-tier wage system for new hires. A tentative agreement was reached on October 13, 2009, that froze wages for entry level workers, limited but did not eliminate the union's right to strike, required Ford to commit to production levels at existing plants, and required Ford to give workers a $1,000 cash bonus in March 2010. But significant opposition to the new agreement broke out among the UAW members at Ford. Despite extensive efforts by King to secure ratification of the deal, UAW members rejected the contract roughly 70 percent to 30 percent. Gettelfinger said the rejection of the contract was a personal reflection of his leadership, and did not reflect on King's leadership or negotiating skills. Gettelfinger then imposed the contract on UAW members by invoking a seldom-used provision of the UAW's constitution.

On December 10, 2009, just a month after the Ford contract was rejected, King announced he would run for the presidency of the UAW. There were some concerns voiced in the press about King's viability as a candidate, since the UAW had lost 40 percent of its membership in the past eight years (18 percent since 2008), and had seen its assets shrink by $69 million (5.8 percent) since 2008. Although the rules of the political caucus that nominated King require union officers to retire after reaching the age of 65, the 63-year-old King ran anyway even though this meant he could serve only a single term.

King was opposed by Gary Walkowicz, a member from King's former Local 600. It was the first time since 1992 that there had been a contest for the presidency of the UAW.

Bob King won the race for president of the UAW on June 15, 2010. The vote was 2,115 to 74, giving King a winning margin of 97 percent of the vote.

One newspaper reporter described King as an effective organizer and a "fiery" public speaker. King said he would pursue an agenda of "equality of gain" under which financially recovered automakers would share their economic gains with workers. The UAW's contracts the Chrysler, Ford, and General Motors all expire in 2011. King also said he would seek to roll back some of the concessions the union had made in the past four years, and engage in extensive organizing to rebuild the union's membership. According to Bernie Ricke, president of Local 600, King is a firm believer in Social Movement Unionism, a philosophy that argues unions should form and promote broad coalitions to seek greater social and economic justice.

==== Retirement ====
Traditionally, no one over the age of 65 runs for president of the UAW. Since King was 67 years old, he declined to run for re-election in 2014 and retired.

===== Other positions =====
King is a member of the NAACP, the Democratic Party, and the Coalition of Labor Union Women. He has also served as a national vice president of the Muscular Dystrophy Association.

King is also a committed human rights activist. He led a group of union officials to El Salvador in 1989 to monitor elections there, and he has participated in protests at the School of the Americas, a United States Department of Defense facility at Fort Benning near Columbus, Georgia, which many accuse of training Latin American soldiers and officers in techniques later used to commit human rights violations.

== Personal life ==
King married Moe Fitzsimons, and the couple have five children, of which two were adopted from South Korea.

== Bibliography ==
- Akre, Brian A. " Strikes to Dominate UAW Convention." Associated Press. June 21, 1998.
- Aguilar, Louis. "Bob King Wins UAW Presidency." Detroit News. June 17, 2010.
- Aguilar, Louis. "Passion, Pragmatism Drive UAW's King." Detroit News. June 11, 2010.
- Aguilar, Louis. "UAW Dissident Will Seek Union Presidency." Detroit News. June 10, 2010.
- Aguilar, Louis. "UAW Won't Try to Reach New Deal." Detroit News. November 3, 2009.
- Atkins, Kimberly. " National Labor Relations Board Draws Union Ire." Lawyers USA. November 19, 2007.
- Barkholz, David. "Business-Labor Partnerships Grow Amid Some Skepticism." Crain's Detroit Business. November 29, 1993.
- Braunstein, Janet. "Bieber: Workers Gave Ford Its Success." Associated Press. June 10, 1987.
- Bunkley, Nick. "New Autoworkers Leader Hopes to Revitalize Union." New York Times. June 16, 2010.
- Bunkley, Nick. "Next Chief Is Nominated for a Troubled Auto Union." New York Times. December 16, 2009.
- Bunkley, Nick. "Some Union Votes Go Against Cuts at Ford." New York Times. October 28, 2009.
- Bunkley, Nick. "U.A.W. Asks Ford Workers To Accept Revised Contract." New York Times. October 14, 2009.
- Bunkley, Nick. "U.A.W. Wants to Share in Big 3's Gains After Years of Pain." New York Times. May 13, 2010.
- Bunkley, Nick and Maynard, Micheline. "Buyouts at Ford Are No. 1 Topic for Union Leaders Today." New York Times. August 29, 2006.
- Cabadas, Joseph. River Rouge: Ford's Industrial Colossus. St. Paul, Minn.: Motorbooks International, 2004.
- Carty, Sharon Silke. "Ford Offers Hourly Workers Buyouts." USA Today. September 15, 2006.
- Chappell, Lindsay. "The UAW Knocks, But Few Workers Answer." Automotive News. April 8, 2002.
- Clanton, Brett and Hoffman, Bryce G. "UAW Appoints New Guard." Detroit News. June 16, 2006.
- "Diary." Cleveland Plain Dealer. November 15, 1997.
- Dine, Philip. " Labor Marching Again, But Does It Matter?" St. Louis Post-Dispatch. November 23, 2007.
- Durbin, Dee-Ann. "UAW President to Seek Another Term at Convention in Las Vegas." Associated Press. December 6, 2005.
- Durbin, Dee-Ann and Krisher, Tom. "AP Source: UAW to Nominate King as Next President." Associated Press. December 11, 2009.
- Durbin, Dee-Ann and Krisher, Tom. "Ford, UAW See Opposition to Contract Changes." Associated Press. October 22, 2009.
- Durbin, Dee-Ann and Krisher, Tom. "Ford Workers Reject Contract Changes." Associated Press. October 31, 2009.
- Ellis, Michael. "Gettelfinger Outlines Goals." Detroit Free Press. June 16, 2006.
- Evanoff, Ted. "UAW Chief Could Use a Gore Win." Indianapolis Star. November 4, 2000.
- "Ford Deal Overwhelmingly Approved by UAW." Buffalo Business First. November 14, 2007.
- "Ford Mustang Plan." Reuters. August 20, 1987.
- "Ford Worker in Long-Shot Bid for UAW Presidency." Associated Press. June 10, 2010.
- Gallagher, John. "GM, DC May Opt to Change Suppliers." Detroit Free Press. June 14, 2002.
- Gallagher, John. "Next UAW Leader Looks For Growth." Detroit Free Press. November 9, 2001.
- Gallagher, John. "UAW's Chief Defends Daimler." Detroit Free Press. April 6, 2001.
- Gardner, Greg and Snavely, Brent. "King Poised to Take Helm of UAW." Detroit Free Press. December 12, 2009.
- Garsten, Ed. "Gettelfinger to Run for UAW Leader." Associated Press. November 8, 2001.
- Garsten, Ed. "Ron Gettelfinger Elected to Lead UAW." Associated Press. June 5, 2002.
- Garsten, Ed. "UAW Reports Progress in Organizing Workers at Supplier's Plants." Associated Press. August 6, 2002.
- Gittell, Jody Hoffer. High Performance Healthcare: Using the Power of Relationships to Achieve Quality, Efficiency and Resilience. New York: McGraw-Hill, 2009.
- Gould, William B. A Primer on American Labor Law. Cambridge, Mass.: MIT Press, 2004.
- Grant, Alison. "NLRB Reviewing Unions' Strategy." Cleveland Plain Dealer. June 12, 2004.
- Haglund, Rick. "UAW Expanding Membership Beyond Autoworkers." Newhouse News Service. May 2, 2001.
- Hakim, Danny. "Big Loss at Nissan Seems to Undercut U.A.W. Objectives." New York Times. October 5, 2001.
- Higgins, James V. "Gettelfinger Quickly Shows Companies UAW Means Business." Detroit News. June 16, 2002.
- Higgins, Tim. "An Uncertain Future." Detroit Free Press. March 20, 2009.
- Hoffman, Bryce G. "Ford Offers Richer Buyouts." Detroit News. January 24, 2008.
- Hoffman, Bryce G. "Ford Union Workers Protest Contract Deal." Detroit News. October 23, 2009.
- Hoffman, Bryce G. "King Emerges As Next UAW Chief." Detroit News. December 12, 2009.
- Hoffman, Bryce G. "UAW-Ford Deal Saves Some Plants From Closure." Detroit News. November 3, 2007.
- Hoffman, Bryce G. "UAW, Ford Sign Contract." Detroit News. December 4, 2007.
- Hoffman, Bryce G. "UAW, Heads of Ford Locals Talk." Detroit News. August 6, 2009.
- Hoffman, Bryce G. "UAW Vice President Criticizes GM Plan." Detroit News. May 7, 2009.
- Hoffman, Bryce G. "UAW Vote May Hurt Ford, Region." Detroit News. November 2, 2009.
- Hoffman, Bryce G.; Clanton, Brett; and Terlep, Sharon. "UAW Chiefs Warm to More Ford Buyouts." Detroit News. August 30, 2006.
- Hoffman, Bryce G. and Valcourt, Josee. "Leadership Change Looms." Detroit News. June 9, 2006.
- Holland, Jesse J. "NLRB Sets Window for Decertification." USA Today. October 2, 2007.
- Howes, Daniel. "Workers May Derail Ford." Detroit News. October 27, 2009.
- Hudson, Mike. "Gettelfinger Puts Priority on Health Care." Detroit News. June 20, 2003.
- Johnson, Kimberly S. "UAW Bristles As Ford Seeks Further Concessions." Associated Press. August 27, 2009.
- Johnson, Kimberly S. and Krisher, Tom. "UAW Official: 2nd Ford Local Approves Concessions." Associated Press. March 2, 2009.
- Jones, Terril Yue. "UAW Loses Bid to Enter Nissan Plant." Los Angeles Times. October 4, 2001.
- Kertesz, Louise. "UAW Dissidents Lose Out." Automotive News. June 26, 1989.
- Kertesz, Louise and Mandel, Dutch. "In a Bind Over Repairs, Mazda Concedes to Union." Automotive News. October 9, 1989.
- Konrad, Rachel. "Police Arrest 21 at Latest Protest in Paper Strike." Detroit Free Press. August 31, 1996.
- Konrad, Rachel. "66 Arrested in Protest at Free Press Building." Detroit Free Press. March 29, 1996.
- Krisher, Tom. "AP Source: Ford Says It Wants 4,200 Fewer Workers." Associated Press. September 11, 2008.
- Krisher, Tom. "Ford Execs Expect Buyouts to Help Return Company to Black Ink." Associated Press. February 15, 2008.
- Krisher, Tom."Ford Likely to Fall Short of Hourly Job Reduction Target." Associated Press. March 21, 2008.
- Krisher, Tom. "UAW Chooses Key Negotiators for Bargaining." Associated Press. June 15, 2006.
- Krisher, Tom. "Union Leader: Workers Must Gain If Autos Recover." Associated Press. May 11, 2010.
- Krisher, Tom and Durbin, Dee-Ann. "Ford, Union Reach Tentative Deal." Associated Press. November 3, 2007.
- Krisher, Tom and Durbin, Dee-Ann. "Local UAW Leaders Unanimously Recommend Approval of Tentative 4-Year Contract With Ford." Associated Press. November 5, 2007.
- Lindquist, Diane. " UAW Convention Official Sees a Pivotal Year Ahead for Union." San Diego Union-Tribune. June 5, 1986.
- Lippert, John. "Retooling the UAW." Detroit Free Press. August 1, 1994.
- Lippert, John. "The UAW Campaign: Top Job Is A Given." Detroit Free Press. September 15, 1994.
- Lippert, John. "UAW Chief Expected to Get Vote of Confidence With Re-Election." Cleveland Plain Dealer. June 21, 1998.
- Lippert, John and Naughton, Keith. "UAW Set to Nominate King as President." Buffalo News. December 12, 2009.
- Massing, Michael. "Detroit's Strange Bedfellows." New York Times. February 7, 1988.
- Maynard, Micheline. "UAW Leaders Happy at Victory Over Dissidents." United Press International. May 16, 1983.
- Maynard, Micheline. "U.A.W. President Elected for Another 4 Years." New York Times. June 15, 2006.
- Maynard, Micheline and Bunkley, Nick. "Union Reaches Tentative 4-Year Agreement With Ford." New York Times. November 4, 2007.
- McCracken, Jeffrey. "UAW Wins Major Pact." Detroit Free Press. August 14, 2003.
- Miller, Bruce A. "Gettelfinger Creates Strategy for Increasing Union Ranks." Detroit News. August 8, 2002.
- Miller, Joe. "Yokich Calls for New Global Ties." Automotive News. June 29, 1998.
- Miller, Karin. "Nissan Workers at Tennessee Plant Reject UAW Representation." Associated Press. October 3, 2001.
- "New UAW Post Targets Increase in Membership." Dallas Morning News. November 16, 1997.
- Nowell, Paul. "Freightliner Workers Reject Offer to Join UAW." Associated Press. March 20, 2002.
- "People." Crain's Detroit Business. September 20, 1999.
- Ramirez, Charles E. "Supplier to Let UAW Recruit." Detroit News. October 15, 2003.
- Sedgwick, David. "UAW Targets Auto Suppliers." Automotive News. December 21, 1998.
- Serwach, Joseph. "Potential Leaders Have Pros, Cons." Crain's Detroit Business. February 14, 2000.
- Serwach, Joseph. "UAW Loses Fight With Kmart in Canton After Wins Elsewhere." Crain's Detroit Business. May 24, 1999.
- Serwach, Joseph. "Waiting in the Wings." Crain's Detroit Business. February 14, 2000.
- Shepardson, David. "UAW Reaches Health Care Trust Fund Deal With Ford." Detroit News. February 24, 2009.
- Sherefkin, Robert. "UAW Organizing Drive to Target Suppliers." Crain's Detroit Business. June 22, 1998.
- Sherefkin, Robert and Ankeny, Robert. "Behind the Scenes, Some Local Labor Leaders Battle." Crain's Detroit Business. October 27, 1997.
- Siegel, Richard A. "Dana Corp., 351 NLRB No. 28 (September 29, 2007)." Memorandum OM 08-07. Office of the General Counsel, National Labor Relations Board. October 22, 2007. Accessed 2010-06-18.
- Siegel, Suzanne. "Bonior Arrested at Rally." Detroit Free Press. July 12, 1997.
- Snavely, Brent. "Challenges Await King as UAW Head." Detroit Free Press. June 13, 2010.
- Snavely, Brent. "Ford Seeks New Union Talks." Detroit Free Press. May 7, 2009.
- Snavely, Brent. "Ford UAW Leaders Get Local Input." Detroit Free Press. August 6, 2009.
- Snavely, Brent. "King Excels at Strategy, Innovation." Detroit Free Press. March 14, 2010.
- Snavely, Brent. "King's Activist Roots Go Deep." Detroit Free Press. June 13, 2010.
- Snavely, Brent. "Most Opposed Ford Deal Changes." Detroit Free Press. November 3, 2009.
- Snavely, Brent. "UAW's Bob King Expected to Give Union Spark." Detroit Free Press. June 17, 2010.
- Stepan-Norris, Judith and Zeitlin, Maurice. Left Out: Reds and America's Industrial Unions. New York: Cambridge University Press, 2003.
- Tierney, Christine and Aguilar, Louis. "UAW Looks Toward Gettelfinger Successor." Detroit News. March 20, 2009.
- United Auto Workers. 2007 Media Fact Book. Detroit: United Auto Workers, 2007. Accessed 2010-06-19.
- "UAW Creates New Post." Newsday. November 14, 1997.
- "UAW Head Yokich Enjoyed Success, Suffered Problems During Tenure." Associated Press. May 19, 2001.
- "UAW Official Says Union Willing to Help With 'Crisis' at Ford." Associated Press. August 8, 2006.
- "UAW Picks Officers." Detroit Free Press. November 7, 1994.
- "UAW, Rouge Steel Settle Tentatively After Year of Bargaining." Associated Press. July 14, 1987.
- Von Bergen, Jane M. "Angry Clash of Ideologies Splits NLRB." The Philadelphia Inquirer. November 10, 2007.
- Walsh, Mick. "SOA Watch: City Prepares for Protesters." Columbus Ledger-Enquirer. November 14, 2004.
- Walsh, Tom. "Gettelfinger Has to Flex Workers' Muscle." Detroit Free Press. October 11, 2007.
- Walsh, Tom. "UAW Raps GM Plan on Imports." Detroit Free Press. May 7, 2009.
- Webster, Sarah A. "Ford Buyouts Under 3,000." Detroit Free Press. November 5, 2008.
- Webster, Sarah A. "Ford Is Building a Better Buyout." Detroit Free Press. January 24, 2008.
- Webster, Sarah A. "Ford to Expand Buyout Campaign." Detroit Free Press. September 5, 2008.
- Webster, Sarah A. "Ford, UAW Tentative Deal: No Strike, No More Plant Closings." Detroit Free Press. November 3, 2007.
- Webster, Sarah A. "UAW, Axle Alliance Reach a Noteworthy Contract." Detroit Free Press. October 12, 2004.
- Webster, Sarah A. "UAW Leaders Applaud Ford Deal." Detroit Free Press. November 6, 2007.
- Webster, Sarah A. "UAW Woos Parts Makers." Detroit Free Press. August 30, 2003.
- Whoriskey, Peter. "Ford, UAW Agree to Labor Contract." Washington Post. October 14, 2009.
- Wieland, Barbara. "Neutrality Pacts Hit Nerve for Workers." Lansing State Journal. May 16, 2004.
- Woodyard, Chris. "UAW Sees Growth Past Blue Collar." USA Today. June 16, 2006.
- Zverina, Jan A. "Ford Distributes Profit Sharing Checks." United Press International. March 12, 1986.

Trade union offices
Preceded by Ron Gettelfinger	President of the United Auto Workers; 2010–2014	Succeeded by Dennis Williams
