= Autoworker Caravan =

The Autoworker Caravan
- Formation: 2008
- Type: Advocacy group
- Location: Detroit, MI
- Region served: USA
- Website: autoworkercaravan.net

The Autoworker Caravan is an advocacy group dedicated to promoting the interests of Unionized American Autoworkers. It is primarily based in Detroit Michigan, but has a network of activists covering virtually every major American facility operated by the Big Three automobile manufacturers. The Caravan is composed of both active and retired UAW members. It is also sometimes referred to as the AWC.

The group's stated mission is "to be the Autoworker's advocate", by promoting ideals such as solidarity, labor justice, and green economic progress. Occasionally it opposes official UAW policies and agenda when they are not in the best interest of workers. Some Caravan members produce articles, op-eds, weblog posts, YouTube interviews, and are frequent guests in the media. They conduct workshop conferences and public forums to broaden the parameters of automotive policy debate to allow greater consideration of labor's role.

The Autoworker Caravan started in December 2008 as a grass roots effort by auto workers to lobby Congress during the 2008 - 2009 auto-bailout proceedings on Capitol Hill. It grew in response to the 2009 labor contract modifications forced upon General Motors and Chrysler workers on the eve of each automaker’s 2009 bankruptcy. Caravan members played a role in convincing Ford workers to reject similar labor contract modifications later that year.

Caravan members have been critical of UAW President Bob King's stance on several issues, including the South Korea - United States Free Trade Agreement (KORUS), a two-tier system for wages and benefits implemented in the 2007 UAW contracts, and King’s refusal to support a large group of non-union workers fired from GM's plant in Colombia after they were injured on the job. Caravan members have praised UAW initiatives on other issues, such as Bob King’s plan to organize the foreign southern auto transplant workers, and King’s support for collective bargaining rights in places such as Wisconsin, Ohio, and Michigan.

The group is best known for its annual demonstrations outside the North American International Auto Show in Detroit.
