= Owen Bieber =

American labor union activist (1929–2020)

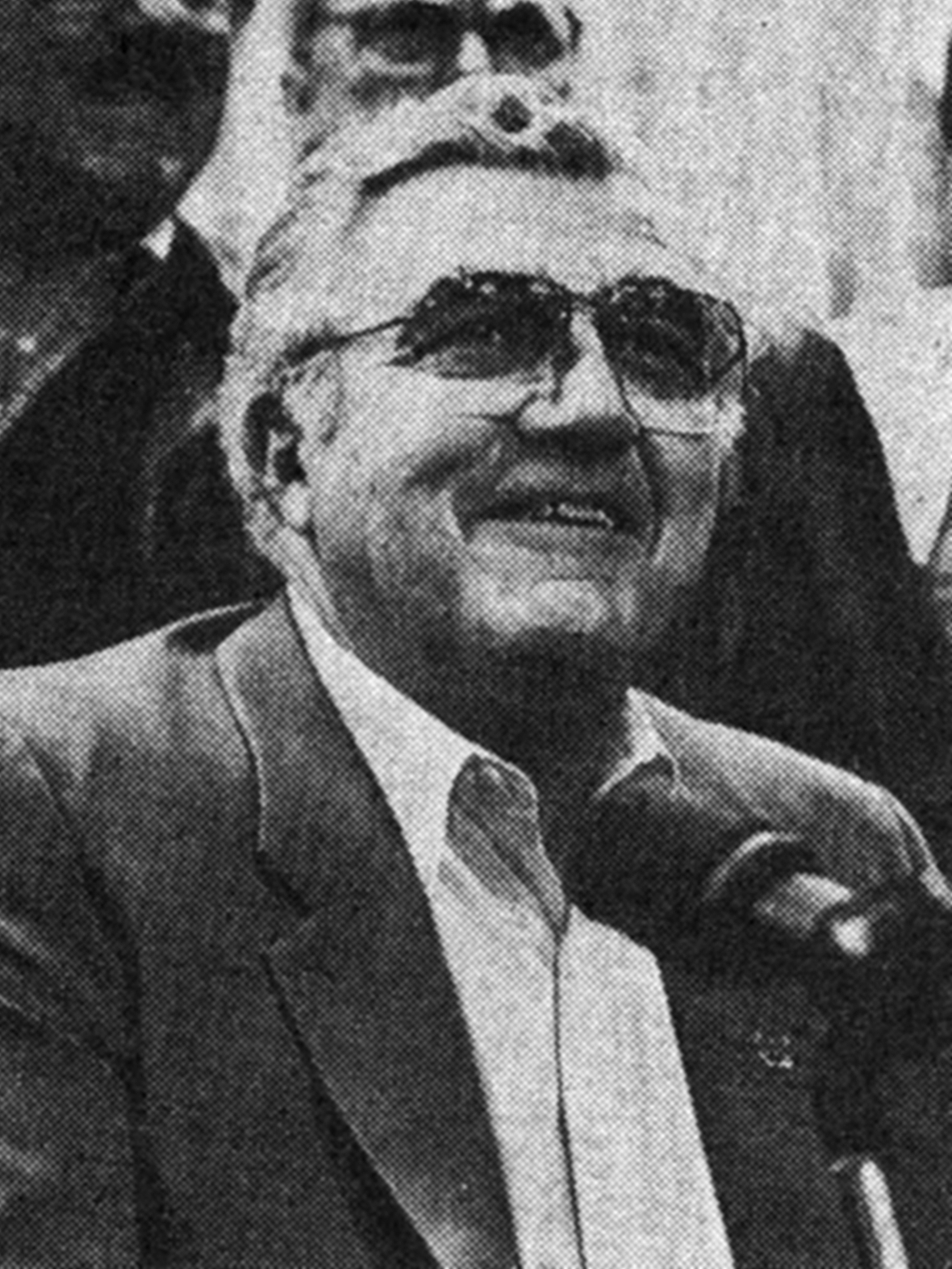
- Bieber in 1985

7th President of the United Auto Workers
- In office May 19, 1983 – June 15, 1995
- Preceded by: Douglas Fraser
- Succeeded by: Stephen Yokich

Personal details
- Born: Owen Frederick Bieber; December 28, 1929 Dorr Township, Michigan U.S.
- Died: February 17, 2020 (aged 90) Detroit, Michigan, U.S.
- Occupation: Labor leader
- Known for: President, United Auto Workers

Owen Frederick Bieber (/ˈbiːbər/; December 28, 1929 – February 17, 2020) was an American labor union activist. He was president of the United Auto Workers (UAW) from 1983 to 1995.

Born in Michigan, Bieber joined the McInerney Spring and Wire Company, an automotive parts supplier in Grand Rapids, after finishing high school. His father was also employed at the company, and had co-founded a UAW local there. Bieber himself became active within the local, rising from shop steward to its president between 1949 and 1956. In 1961 he became a part-time union organizer for the UAW's international union and retired as president of the local a year later, to work full-time for the international UAW. In 1980 he was elected as the head of the UAW's General Motors Department.

After a hotly contested election in 1983, he was chosen to head the union in October of that year. His time as president of the union was marked by support of several political causes, including the boycott against South African apartheid and opposition to the North American Free Trade Agreement. He oversaw the union during the shrinking of the automobile manufacturing industry in the US, and led them through a number of tense negotiations with the Big Three automobile manufacturers that included strikes and other labor action. While he set a goal of adding new union members throughout his presidency, he largely failed as union organizing efforts at Honda and Nissan plants were defeated. His presidency also saw the splintering of his own union, with the Canadian division breaking off to form its own independent organization (the Canadian Auto Workers), amid deep internal divisions which developed throughout his term. He retired from the UAW in 1995.

== Early life and career ==
Owen F. Bieber was born in December 1929 to Albert F. and Minnie (Schwartz) Bieber in the hamlet of North Dorr, Dorr Township, Allegan County, Michigan. His father was of German descent and an autoworker at McInerney Spring and Wire Company (an automotive parts supplier) who had co-founded UAW Local 687. It was the first UAW local organized within the city limits of Grand Rapids, Michigan. The family were devout Roman Catholics, and Bieber attended Visitation Elementary School (a two-room school) and Catholic Central High School in nearby Grand Rapids. As a child, he worked pulling weeds in onion and celery fields. He graduated from high school in 1948, and in July of that year took a job at McInerney Spring and Wire as a wire bender, making seats for Cadillac and Hudson cars. "You had to bend 8- and 9-gauge spring wire, sometimes five wires at a time. Those Hudsons, they had a seat four miles long ... It was a hard job. After the first hour in there, I felt like just leaving. If my father hadn't worked there, too, I probably would've", he later said.

Bieber married his high school sweetheart, the former Shirley M. Van Woerkom, on November 25, 1950, and the couple had three sons (all of them became autoworkers) and two daughters. They maintained a home in North Dorr as well as Southfield.

Although his wire bending job was supposed to be only summer employment, Bieber stayed and did not go on to college. Bieber was elected a shop steward of Local 687 (which covered Grand Rapids and most of the immediate surrounding area) in 1949, and in 1951 was elected to the local's executive board. He was elected to Local 687's collective bargaining committee in 1955, and became the local's president in 1956. In 1961, he became a part-time union organizer for the international union. Bieber retired as Local 687's president in 1962, and took a full-time position as an international representative and organizer with the UAW. He worked closely with Kenneth W. Robinson, the director of UAW Region 1D (then the largest region in the international union). Robinson promoted Bieber to servicing representative in 1964, and made him his personal aide.

On December 18, 1972, Robinson appointed Bieber assistant director of Region 1D after the incumbent, Charles Rogers, was diagnosed with cancer and stepped down. In 1974, Robinson stepped down as director of Region 1D due to ill health. Bieber was elected as his successor, and held the position until 1980.

=== GM Department director ===
In 1980, Bieber won election as vice president of the General Motors Department of the UAW. Irving Bluestone, who had led the GM Department since 1970, had retired. The UAW Steering Committee (a body of about 400 local union presidents) unanimously endorsed Bieber for the position. Also nominated for vice president slots were Donald Ephlin, Ray Majerus, and Stephen Yokich. Bieber won the election at the UAW's national convention in June 1980, receiving the highest number of votes of any candidate.

Bieber was GM Department director for just two and a half years, but negotiated a historic contract with General Motors (GM) in 1982. The early 1980s recession and competition from Japanese automakers had cut very deeply into GM's market share, and the company had laid off more than 140,000 of its 330,000 production workers (roughly half its workforce). UAW membership had fallen to 1.2 million from a peak of 1.5 million in 1979. In March 1981, nine months after Bieber became GM Department head, GM asked the union to reopen its contract and negotiation concessions but the union refused. In November 1981, however, GM began using its worker participation program to convince its unionized employees to reopen their contract. Bieber strongly criticized the company for generating "distrust of the U.A.W. leadership", "spoonfeed[ing]" a "captive audience", and perverting the worker participation program into a means to "propagandize or parrot the current views of the chairman of the board of G.M. as to how to save G.M. through worker sacrifice." But behind the scenes, UAW president Douglas Fraser, Bieber, and others were secretly already talking with GM about reopening the contract. The union agreed to enter into talks in January 1982, hoping to win job security commitments for its members in exchange for wage and benefit concessions. The decision was a historic one, as it was only the second time in UAW history that the union had agreed to reopen a contract. It was historic as well as it was the first concessionary contract the union had negotiated.

In April 1982, UAW members approved the concessionary contract Bieber negotiated. Initially, GM agreed to link wage concessions to reductions in the price of its vehicles, but this was not part of the eventual agreement. The contract concessions were (at the time) the largest ever made to GM. The workers agreed to forgo an annual 3 percent wage increase, eliminated nine paid holidays over the next two years, deferred cost of living adjustments in the first three months of the contract to the final three quarters of the contract, established a wage tier that paid new employees 20 percent less, and implemented fines for chronic absenteeism. The union also agreed to negotiate over work rules at the local level. In return, GM agreed to keep four plants open which it had planned to close, agreed to a two-year moratorium on plant closings, established profit sharing, established a prepaid legal service program for its employees, and promised that if it laid off workers with 15 years or more of job experience it would pay them 50 percent of their annual salary. The pact was only narrowly approved, however (114,468 for and 105,090 against), even though UAW members at Ford Motor Company had approved a similar pact by a 3-to-1 margin.

Implementing the contract proved troublesome, however. Just days after the pact was approved by UAW members, GM attempted to give its executives large pay bonuses. Bieber angrily denounced the pay plan and GM backed off the proposal just two days later; however, the damage was done. Bieber began local bargaining over the work rules, but angry workers refused to negotiate any changes and bargaining ended in July 1982 with no changes.

In his last year as GM Department director, Bieber discussed with GM the impact outsourcing was having on UAW members. When GM signed a compact with Toyota to co-own and co-manufacture automobiles in California, Bieber worked to prevent UAW members in affected GM plants from engaging in a wildcat strike.

=== UAW presidential race ===
The UAW constitution barred anyone over the age of 65 from running for president of the union. 64-year-old Douglas Fraser won re-election as UAW president in July 1981, but was barred from seeking a third term. In January 1982, Owen Bieber, Donald Ephlin (director of the Ford Department), Raymond Majerus (secretary-treasurer and director of the Aerospace Department and American Motors Department), and Stephen Yokich (director of the Agricultural Implement and Skilled Trades Department) were considered his most likely successors. At that time, Bieber and Majerus seemed to have the most support from the union's executive board.

It is a tradition in the UAW for the union's executive board to bar candidates from campaigning while contract negotiations are going on, to prevent any campaign from distracting union members or inflaming member opinions. Since the election of Walter Reuther as UAW president in 1947, the union had been dominated by the "Administrative Caucus," a pro-incumbent political party within the UAW which controlled every seat on the UAW executive board and the vast majority of leadership positions at the local level. Traditionally, the 26 Administrative Caucus members sitting on the UAW's executive board met first to select the caucus' official nominees for national office, then referred these nominees to the union's Administrative Caucus-dominated Steering Committee, which then ratified the board's choice. Delegates to the union's annual convention voted on these nominees (with no direct election by the membership). Although these procedures did not preclude the Steering Committee from rejecting the "official" slate or challengers from running for office, they made it highly unlikely that challengers would emerge or that the members would elect them if they did. (Additionally, union rules required that any challenger announce his or her candidacy at least 90 days before the election, and take a leave of absence from his or her job in order to run for office.) Although the executive board had not anticipated meeting until December 1982 to select its official candidate for president, the lack of a clear front-runner and the economic and collective bargaining challenges facing the union put pressure on the executive board to make its choice months earlier.

By late August, Majerus seemed to have a slim lead among executive board members over Ephlin, while the other candidates (including Bieber) did not have much support. At its meeting on September 20, the UAW executive board agreed to lift the campaigning moratorium, and set November 12 as the date for choosing its official slate. Support for the four candidates had not changed by this time. The relatively youthful Yokich was considered a dark horse candidate, and he was under pressure to withdraw and support one of the others. Ephlin, however, appeared to be gaining support due to his successful contract negotiations with Ford and his increasingly polished public speaking skills.

Bieber hesitated to enter the race for president. He announced his candidacy only in mid-October, long after Majerus and Ephlin. He later said he "agonized" about entering the race for the presidency after realizing what a heavy burden it might become.

On October 31, Yokich withdrew from the race and threw his support behind Bieber. Days later, a survey of 130 UAW local leaders in Michigan showed that Ephlin and Bieber had the most grassroots support, with Majerus a distant fourth behind Yokich. But Majerus appeared to have far more support on the UAW executive board, where African American vice president Marc Stepp was vocal in his support of the Majerus campaign. One media report estimated that Majerus had the support of as many as 10 of the 26 board members, while Bieber (whose campaign had been targeting regional directors and workers) may have had as many as 12 votes. Nonetheless, others considered Bieber a dark horse candidate because of the significant dissatisfaction the GM concessionary contract had generated.

As the UAW executive board gathered to make its decision, the race had shifted and Bieber appeared to have majority support on the board. Bieber appeared to have gained ground because he was a compromise candidate acceptable to both the Ephlin and Majerus camps. Some board members appear to have preferred Bieber because he came from the GM Department, the union's largest. Majerus, however, had nearly as much support. Press reports indicated that Ephlin had a chance, if the board deadlocked over Bieber and Majerus. The board voted for Bieber as its preferred nominee. Union insiders later described the executive board's choice as a surprise. None of the three candidates received a majority on the first ballot. Ephlin, who had the fewest votes, withdrew from the race, and the board voted 15 to 11 to support Bieber. (Press reports later described this as "unusually close".) Majerus withdrew, and the board took a third ballot to make its decision unanimous (a tradition within the union). The Steering Committee ratified the executive board's decision shortly thereafter. Bieber's campaigning among the regional directors, who formed a majority on the executive board, swung the election in his favor.

Bieber's election was not a foregone conclusion, however. The UAW leadership was by now facing "the first widespread opposition since the bitter factional days of the 1940s." The unions secret talks with GM in the fall of 1981 had become known, and many union members were very angry about them. It was no longer clear that members would do as their leaders wished. A group of workers based in Wisconsin submitted a constitutional amendment eliminating the executive board's and Steering Committee's roles in the nomination process, and won enough support from the membership to force a roll call vote on the amendment on the convention floor. But the convention delegates overwhelmingly rejected the proposal by a 3-to-1 margin. No opposition candidate emerged, and Bieber was elected President of the UAW on May 18, 1983. His election marked the end of an era in the UAW. He was the first UAW president who did not work directly with the founders of the union and who did not work directly and closely with Walter Reuther.

== UAW presidency ==
Bieber was not considered as charismatic as his predecessors. He was often reticent to the point of shyness with the press, and took lessons from broadcasters to improve his speaking. His leadership style was considered over-cautious, as he feared to make mistakes, and he was emotionally stoic.

Initially, Bieber was denied a seat on the board of directors of Chrysler. Chrysler had put UAW president Douglas Fraser on its board in 1979 after Fraser helped win $1.5 billion in loan guarantees from the federal government that kept Chrysler out of bankruptcy. Worried that Fraser's seat would become the "UAW seat", Chrysler chief executive officer Lee Iacocca threatened not to appoint Fraser's successor to the board of directors. Fraser persuaded Iacocca that appearances would be served if Fraser stayed on a board for one more year, and then the new UAW president could be elected. Iacocca agreed to the plan. Fraser was elected in 1983 to a one-year term on Chrysler's board. Bieber joined the Chrysler board in October 1984, and remained on it until 1991. The UAW went without representation on Chrysler's board for the next seven years, until Stephen Yokich joined the board of the now-German owned company in 1998.

Walter Reuther and other presidents of the UAW had been active in a number of social issues, and Bieber continued that tradition. In 1983, he was a member of a controversial effort to commemorate the 20th anniversary of the March on Washington for Jobs and Freedom. Bieber joined the National Labor Committee, a group which opposed U.S. support for the Contras in Nicaragua. The group successfully overcame vocal opposition from staunch anti-communists on the AFL-CIO executive council to win approval of a resolution that put the labor federation in favor of a negotiated settlement and criticized the Reagan administration of seeking only a military solution. In January 1986, he won AFL-CIO approval of a boycott of U.S. companies doing business in South Africa under apartheid. Later that year, he traveled to South Africa, where he met with several cabinet ministers and angrily demanded that the government release anti-apartheid labor leaders who had been jailed but never charged with any crimes. He also successfully put pressure on GM to pay these workers until they had been convicted. In 1990, shortly after his release from prison, Nelson Mandela traveled to the United States and thanked Bieber for his support; Bieber gave him a guided tour of the Ford River Rouge Complex.

Bieber also pressed for adoption of a national industrial policy. He began pressing for a national industrial policy in June 1983, shortly after his election as UAW president. His efforts reached a high point in 1993, when Bieber the chief executive officers of Chrysler, Ford, and General Motors met with President-elect Bill Clinton—winning Clinton's support for the domestic auto industry. But less than a year later, Clinton won passage of the North American Free Trade Agreement over Bieber's strenuous objections.

=== Collective bargaining ===
Bieber oversaw the negotiation of a number of contracts with the Chrysler, Ford, and General Motors during his 12 years in office.

The first contract negotiation he oversaw were with Chrysler just two months after his election. The negotiations (which began earlier than usual, long before the contract expired) broke down over wages in July 1983. Although a strike seemed likely, the union negotiated a minor contract extension on September 5, and a day later had a new agreement. The contract provided an average wage increase of $2.42 an hour over two years and restored an annual 3 percent wage and quarterly cost of living increases (both of which the company had rejected in July). During the press conference in which he discussed the contract's successful ratification, Bieber fell from the dais and suffered a slight concussion (for which he was briefly hospitalized).

The second round of talks (which occurred about 15 months later) involved GM. Traditionally, the UAW chose one of the "Big Three" (Chrysler, Ford, and General Motors) automakers as a strike target, and negotiate a contract with that company. This contract usually set a standard which the other companies adhered to. Ford or GM was the more common target, as they were much larger than Chrysler. Negotiations with GM began first, with the company asking for a profit-sharing plan rather than wage increases, layoffs of about 19 percent of its 370,000 workers, and a lower wage tier for new workers. Bieber kept Ford and GM guessing as to which company would be the strike target, but finally chose GM on September 6. The talks broke down shortly thereafter, and Bieber called a nationwide strike against General Motors on September 14 as the economy continued to perform only weakly. Over the next six days, more than 91,000 GM workers walked picket lines at 33 plants in 12 states. A contract was agreed to (and successfully ratified) on September 20 which not only gave workers annual pay increases of 2.5 percent and established a $1 billion fund that paid laid off workers a portion of their salary until they were retrained or rehired. The contract, which the union and company called "historic," Twenty-five days later, Ford agreed to a very similar contract. The Ford agreement established a $300 million lay-off fund (Ford's workforce being only a third the size of GM's), and placed a four-year moratorium on plant closings.

Another strike followed at Chrysler the next year. The Ford and GM contracts reopened a pay gap between those companies and Chrysler which the UAW sought to close in late 1984 by asking Chrysler if it would reopen its contract. Chrysler refused, pointing to a no-strike clause in the contract. UAW workers had rejected a 1982 contract which contained profit-sharing, and their 1983 agreement did not have any income security provisions like Ford's and GM's. When the Chrysler contract expired in October 1985, Bieber ordered a strike against the company. More than 70,000 workers in the U.S. and another 10,000 in Canada walked off the job for 12 days in what was the first strike against Chrysler since 1973. The two sides reached an agreement (which was successfully ratified) on October 23 that gave autoworkers a $2,120 non-wage bonus, pay increases and wage parity with the GM and Ford, profit sharing, and payments to workers displaced by new technology.

Bieber announced in December 1985 that he would again seek election as UAW president. He won reelection with no opposition in June 1986.

Bieber oversaw a fourth round of collective bargaining talks in 1987. Ford was chosen as the strike target this time, and after a slight contract extension the union reached a tentative contract with the company on September 17. Bieber agreed to establish joint committees at the national and local levels to explore the use of work teams, changing inefficient work rules, and reducing the number of job classifications. In exchange, the company agreed to a 3 percent annual wage increase in the first year with lump-sum payments equal to 3 percent of wages in the second and third years, no layoffs (except through attrition), an increase in the layoff income security fund to $500 (although it was capped at that amount), pension contribution increases, improvements in health benefits, and increased profit sharing. Twenty-one days later, GM agreed to a very similar contract. GM agreed to close no more plants, institute no more layoffs (so long as sales volumes did not decrease), the same wage and lump-sum package, the same profit sharing arrangement, similar work team and job classification study committees, and establish quality improvement committees in all plants. Both contracts were easily approved by the membership.

The success of the GM and Ford pacts led Chrysler to enter into early talks once more with the union. After just seven weeks of bargaining, Bieber announced a contract which gave company workers a 3 percent annual pay increase over two years and a $1,000 bonus. However, the Chrysler contract did contain a historic clause which prohibited the company from issuing cash or stock bonuses to its executives if its employees did not receive payments under the profit sharing agreement.

Bieber ran for reelection again in 1988 and won against no opposition. His election was by acclamation.

By 1990, Bieber was once more negotiating a contract with GM. However, his control of the collective bargaining process was not as strong as in the past. A local struck the GM plant in Flint, Michigan, on August 8, 1990, about a month before the national contract with the company ended. Bieber had little to do with the strike, which was approved by GM Department Director Stephen Yokich (by now considered Bieber's most likely successor). The Flint strike complicated Bieber's attempts to negotiate a new national contract, and Yokich's approval of the local strike indicated Bieber's weakening control over the union. The Flint strike ended on August 15. Nonetheless, it had generated UAW member unrest with Bieber's leadership of the union. Bieber did not need a contract extension this time, and negotiated a contract identical in wage structure to the 1987 agreement. A Ford contract followed in early October 1990, and a Chrysler contract 20 days later, both of which were very similar to the GM agreement.

Bieber suffered a serious loss at industrial equipment manufacturer Caterpillar Inc., however. The UAW struck Caterpillar in 1982, a strike that (by 1993) was the longest in UAW history and which had severely drained the union's strike fund. By 1989, the UAW was praising the Caterpillar contract. Notwithstanding, Caterpillar began a restructuring program that reduced its workforce by 30 percent while building new plants in the non-union Deep South. By 1991, only 25 percent of its workforce belonged to the UAW. The UAW had negotiated a new contract with John Deere, the giant agricultural machinery manufacturer, and it asked Caterpillar for the same terms. Caterpillar refused, instead demanding major concessions such as a two-tier wage system, the right to subcontract work out to non-union companies, the imposition of 12-hour work shifts, weaker safety rules, a weaker grievance system, greatly scaled back health benefits, and the right to impose flexible work schedules on workers. About 1,870 workers in Decatur, Illinois, struck on November 3, and Caterpillar instituted a nationwide lockout (even in those plants not on strike). Soon more than 13,400 Caterpillar workers were walking the picket line. Caterpillar ended the lockout on March 16, 1992, but few employees went back to work. Caterpillar tendered what it called its last, best offer to Bieber three days later. Bieber rejected the proposal. Caterpillar announced an impasse on March 5, and on April 1 sent all workers a letter demanding that they return to work by April 6 or the company would permanently replace them. Between 400 and 1,200 workers crossed the picket line to return to work (estimates very widely). At the urging of federal mediators, Bieber met one-on-one with Caterpillar Chief Executive Officer Donald V. Fites. Bieber left the meeting convinced that the UAW was left with no alternative but to accept Caterpillar's offer. UAW members went back to work on the company's terms.

Bieber announced he would run for reelection as UAW president in 1992. In January 1992, shortly after Bieber's candidacy was approved by the Administrative Caucus and Steering Committee, he was challenged for the presidency by Jerry Tucker, a former executive board member and leader of the reformist "New Directions" caucus. Tucker, a long-time opponent of joint labor-management committees and work teams, also intended to challenge Bieber's support for these new collective bargaining outcomes at the UAW convention in June. During the convention, it was apparent that Stephen Yokich was now Bieber's "heir apparent." Bieber was easily reelected president of the UAW.

Bieber's final round of collective bargaining talks came in 1993, but once more his control of the union's bargaining apparatus was apparent. In August and September 1992, GM workers in Lordstown, Ohio, struck a critical GM parts plant with Yokich's permission, idling many other GM plants and throwing 40,000 other GM employees out of work. The Detroit Free Press later said that Bieber formally approved the strike, but Yokich was the "quarterback" who actually led the union through it. Despite the problems the Lordstown strike created, Bieber entered contract negotiations with the Big Three automakers seeking pledges against new layoffs. Bieber chose Ford as the strike target, and the company focused on reining in health care costs as its major goal. A new contract was reached on September 15, 1993, but the deal was considered a failure since Bieber was unable to win any major changes to the old agreement. Ford asked for a six-year rather than a three-year agreement, and thereafter gave this goal up and promised instead to increase pension payouts by 17 percent for certain veteran workers. The union agreed to a lower wage for new workers, and extend the time it took for new workers to reach the full wage. No changes were made to the wage or layoff income security provisions. However, Ford did agree to fully pay for health care costs for all workers, but the workers gave up a part of their pay raises to do so. A contract with GM followed the next month. GM sought to reduce its pension costs, but failed. GM, however, forced workers to agree to use vacation time rather than use layoff pay during the summer production shutdown, and gained the right to stop paying layoff pay to workers who refuse jobs at nearby plants. The wage payment scheme was the same as the previous contract.

=== Organizing failures ===
Bieber pledged at the start of his presidency to organize new workers but largely failed. He made a number of efforts to organize new workers early in his presidency but in his last years in office budgeted little money and staff resources to the effort. He also did not invest staff or money into mobilizing UAW members to assist in organizing campaigns. Instead, in his last years in office Bieber spent significant amounts of his own time lobbying for labor law reform (most importantly, a ban on the permanent replacement of striking workers).

Organizing failures were more important than the union's rare successes during Bieber's administration. In September 1983, Bieber negotiated an agreement in which the union was able to extend its collective bargaining contract over the joint GM-Toyota New United Motor Manufacturing, Inc. (NUMMI) automobile manufacturing plant in Fremont, California. The union also won GM's consent to extend its existing collective bargaining relationship over the new GM-owned Saturn Corporation plant in Spring Hill, Tennessee. The National Right to Work Legal Defense Foundation challenged the right of GM to recognize the UAW at the Saturn plant and the right of UAW members to bid first on jobs at the new plant. But the general counsel of the National Labor Relations Board ruled in June 1986 that the bidding rights were properly part of bargaining between GM and the UAW over plant closures that led to the creation of Saturn, and that early extension of the contract was permissible given the number of bidding, existing UAW members. But these victories were uncommon for the UAW under Bieber. When the union began an organizing drive at a Honda-owned manufacturing plant in Ohio in late 1985, most workers wore anti-UAW buttons and it dropped the organizing campaign before the end of the year. In a speech after winning reelection in 1986, Bieber pledged to organize many Japanese-owned plants in the U.S. In 1988, the UAW targeted a Nissan Motors plant in Tennessee, but the organizing drive sputtered and workers voted not to organize with the union in July 1989. Bieber later called these his "most painful" experiences as UAW president.

By the time Bieber left office, UAW membership had fallen to just 800,000.

=== Loss of the Canadian Autoworkers Union ===
During Bieber's tenure in office, the Canadian branch of the UAW broke off and formed an independent union, the Canadian Auto Workers (CAW).

Economic dislocations in the United States and Canada enhanced militancy in the Canadian branch of the UAW. Many Canadian labor unions had long advocated syndicalism, in which democratic labor unions and federations of labor unions control corporations in favor of community needs. Left-wing labor leaders grew in power within the Canadian UAW throughout the 1970s, and many Canadian union members increasingly perceived their unions as vehicles for political power and control. Throughout the 1970s, Canadian unions engaged in a series of lengthy, often bitter strikes (including a general strike in 1976) in which union members confronted large numbers of police defending corporate interests. In 1978, Bob White, a militant syndicalist, was elected Director of the Canadian UAW. Through the 1960s and 1970s, Canadian autoworkers had struggled to achieve pay parity with their American colleagues (although, with the Canadian dollar at the time worth markedly less than the United States dollar, parity essentially gave Canadian workers a wage advantage). With the onset of the early 1980s recession, the UAW in the United States began granting concessionary contracts to the Big Three automakers. But White refused to engage in concessionary bargaining or to open the Canadian contracts early. The American UAW refused to act when the Big Three began moving plants to non-unionized areas, and soon the American UAW was riven by internal factions which resented the concessions while gaining little job security. The American UAW became further paralyzed because it could not act against non-union plants without angering those workers—workers essential (the UAW leadership felt) to the future growth of the union. Moreover, the Canadian leadership felt that giving in to employer demands for "jointedness" (the term of joint quality committees, work teams, profit sharing, and similar initiatives) encouraged the union to collude with management against workers.

The break began in 1984. That year, the Canadian UAW leadership learned that Bieber had actively resisted and counteracted their attempts to avoid a concessionary contract. The Canadian UAW locals at General Motors rejected the contract negotiated by Bieber and his team, and 36,000 union members went out on strike in October. After two weeks, GM agreed to the Canadian union's demands, which included higher annual wage increases and no work teams, no profit sharing, and no joint labor-management committees. The Canadian locals learned that Bieber had threatened to withdraw authorization for their strike, which would have left them without strike pay. The Canadian strike against GM not only strained relationships between the American and Canadian wings of the UAW, but also put a heavy strain on the union's strike fund. Angry at Bieber's interference, White and the Canadian leadership offered a resolution before the UAW executive board which would have limited American interference in Canadian UAW affairs. White's proposal gave the Canadian leadership exclusive control over collective bargaining and strike authorizations, removed international UAW authority over Canadian staff, and granted the Canadians unrestricted access to the UAW strike fund. Bieber strongly opposed the plan, and the UAW executive board rejected it by a vote of 24-to-1.

On December 10, the Canadian UAW announced it was disaffiliating from the UAW and forming its own union. The international UAW executive board agreed not to interfere with that process. The two unions negotiated an agreement in March 1985 which formally separated the two unions and provided for a division of assets.

=== Internal dissent ===
Bieber's 1985 reelection was not without controversy, and the UAW saw its first substantial internal leadership challenges since the 1940s during his presidency.

In 1985, the "New Directions" caucus was formed by UAW local presidents unhappy with the job loss, concessionary bargaining, and "jointedness" being promoted by Bieber and the UAW executive board. It was one of the two most important union reform movements in the American labor movement in the last two decades of the 20th century (the other being Teamsters for a Democratic Union). New Directions leader Jerry Tucker, then Assistant Director of UAW Region 5, ran for office against Region 5 Director Ken Worley in 1986 and lost by two-tenths of a vote in the closest election in union history. Five days into his candidacy, Tucker was fired for disobeying a UAW rule which required staff to take a leave of absence at least 90 days before an election date. Bieber openly supported Worley, and Tucker's supporters alleged that the UAW hierarchy had illegally expended union funds in support of Worley's reelection effort. When Tucker attacked the caucus system of running the union as undemocratic, Bieber angry denounced him and said that Tucker had not only participated in the Administrative Caucus meetings in which Worley was renominated but also knew about the 90-day leave of absence rule and chose to ignore it. Tucker sued to have the rule declared illegal. The election controversy deeply embarrassed Bieber and the UAW (which had long prided itself on its internally democratic procedures). Although Tucker lost his challenge to the 90-day rule, a court held that the UAW had improperly expended union funds to support Worley and had intimidated Tucker's supporters. In a special election held in 1988, Tucker defeated Worley for the Region 5 directorship and joined the UAW executive board.

The dispute over jointedness intensified in the summer of 1985. Bieber negotiated a first contract with Saturn Corp. with extensive consensus decision-making and joint management procedures, one that included union members at the highest levels of management—but a contract which also set wages at only 80 percent of the national auto industry average and which reduced the number of job classifications to just five (enabling the company to move workers around inside the plant much more easily).

The Saturn contract upset many New Directions caucus members, who saw Bieber's advocacy of the contract as another sign of the union's refusal to fight concessions. New Directions members pledged to challenge Bieber's support for "jointedness" at the UAW convention in June 1989. Tucker ran for reelection as Director of Region 5, and ran a candidate for the director of Region 1. Donald Ephlin, Director of the GM Department, retired, claiming exhaustion from the constant battles with the New Directions leadership. Stephen Yokich was named his replacement, which was something of a victory for the New Directions caucus. Bieber mobilized the UAW leadership to defeat Tucker. In an election marred by charges and counter-charges of election fraud, Tucker and the Region 1 candidate both lost by 2-to-1 margins. Bieber strongly criticized the New Directions leadership for not offering concrete alternatives to jointedness, and delivered a strong speech in favor of labor-management cooperation. Bieber's speech had a strong effect on the convention delegates. The delegates easily defeated several procedural votes which would have placed New Directions resolutions on the agenda, and the weakness of the dissidents surprised many observers.

In 1992, Tucker declared the UAW a "bureaucratic one-party state" and announced he would challenge Bieber for the presidency of the UAW. His was the first serious leadership challenge in 40 years. Tucker received only 5 percent of the convention votes, an indication his support may have slipped during the previous three years. The vote was the first roll call vote for president in the union since 1974. That a quarter of the delegates supported New Directions' direct election of the UAW president indicated, however, that the movement still had significant support among a minority of UAW members. New Directions, however, was not able to bring many of its concerns to the convention floor, however. With more than a year to go before collective bargaining with the Big Three began anew, the convention did not address issues such as benefits, job security, and wages.

=== Retirement and death ===
"In a decade that was a nightmare for union leaders nationwide", as The New York Times described the 1980s, Bieber's performance at the collective bargaining table was generally considered exceptional. Although he failed to force the Big Three to buy parts only from unionized companies, he was able to resist employer pressure for deep concessions. Bieber himself said his proudest moment came in 1990 with the establishment of the layoff income fund.

But in the final year of his presidency, Bieber appeared exhausted by the duties of office. A reporter for the Detroit Free Press described him as tired and less vocal than he once was, and noted that the 64-year-old Bieber spent as much time as possible at his vacation home.

Bieber retired in 1995, and Stephen Yokich succeeded him as UAW president.

Bieber died on February 17, 2020, at age 90.

== Other activities ==
Bieber was a self-described "staunch Democrat". However, he was unable to achieve agreement within the UAW over which of the many Democratic candidates to support in the presidential primaries. In 1992, Bieber was unable to win AFL-CIO support for a Democratic presidential primary candidate after his preferred candidate, Senator Tom Harkin, withdrew from the race in March 1992.

Bieber was elected to the Executive Council of the AFL-CIO shortly after assuming the UAW presidency, and served as chair of the Committee on Reindustrialization of the AFL-CIO's Industrial Union Department. However, in 1995 he was one of several AFL-CIO presidents who secretly worked to depose Lane Kirkland as president of the labor federation. The night before the AFL-CIO mid-winter executive council meeting in Bal Harbour, Florida, February 19–20, 1995, Bieber joined 11 other union presidents on the executive council to form a "Committee for Change" committed to removing Kirkland as president of the AFL-CIO. The 11 union leaders had enough votes to unseat Kirkland. During the executive council meeting, the group demanded that Kirkland resign or retire, but he refused. Bieber strongly supported the successful candidacy of John Sweeney as his successor. Bieber stepped down as UAW president before the AFL-CIO quadrennial convention in August 1995, however, and left to Yokich the actual job of electing a successor to Kirkland.

Bieber also served on the President's Advisory Committee for Trade Negotiations (an advisory committee of the federal government) and was a long-time member of the National Urban League. He also was a veteran member of the board of directors of the National Association for the Advancement of Colored People (NAACP). In this role, Bieber proved critical in the effort to remove William Gibson as chairman of the NAACP. Many members of the NAACP board wished to replace Gibson with Myrlie Evers-Williams, widow of slain civil rights activist Medgar Evers. But Gibson's support on the board was still strong. Evers-Williams' supporters knew that Bieber wanted Gibson removed, but that Bieber rarely attended NAACP board meetings. Evers-Williams' backers persuaded Bieber that his attendance was critical to the vote, and he attended the meeting. Gibson was dismissed as president on February 18, 1995, by a vote of 30 to 29.

Bieber was also heavily involved in his local community as well. He served on the board of directors of Project Rehab (a Michigan-based alcohol and drug rehabilitation service agency), the Michigan League for Human Services, West Michigan Comprehensive Health Planning Unit, the Michigan State Health Advisory Board, and the Michigan State Mental Health Board. He also was a member of the Personnel and Labor Advisory Council of Grand Valley State College.

== See also ==
- Final Offer, an award-winning film about the 1984 GM negotiations and the formation of the Canadian Auto Workers.
- Roger & Me, a 1989 film about the impact General Motors' restructuring efforts had on the city of Flint, Michigan.

== Notes ==
Trade union offices
Preceded by Douglas Fraser	President of the United Automobile Workers; 1983–1995	Succeeded by Stephen Yokich
