= Dennis Williams (unionist) =

Former American labor union leader

Dennis D. Williams (born May 1953) is a former American labor union leader, who was convicted of embezzlement.

== Union leader ==
Williams grew up with a foster family, and served in the United States Marines. After being demobbed, he became a welder with J.I. Case in Rock Island, Illinois, and in 1977 he joined the United Auto Workers (UAW) union. In 1988, he began working full-time for the union's organizing department. He became a regional director in 2001, based in Chicago, during which time he was the first UAW leader to endorse Barack Obama's presidential bid.

In 2010, Williams was elected as secretary-treasurer of the UAW. In this role, he was prominent in negotiating contracts with carmakers in Detroit, and was credited with securing an increase in membership dues, improving the union's finances. He was elected as the union's president in 2014, proposing focusing on the national income gap, negotiations with employers, and the 2016 United States presidential election. He was also elected as a vice president of the AFL-CIO, and chaired the federation's Industrial Union Council.

== Embezzlement conviction ==
Williams promised to serve only a single four-year term as leader of the UAW, and he retired as planned in 2018. By that time, allegations of financial corruption in the union had emerged. Williams insisted that he knew nothing about many of the cases, but in September 2020 he pleaded guilty to conspiracy to embezzle union funds. He was sentenced to 21 months in prison, was fined $10,000, and ordered to repay $132,000 to the UAW.

Trade union offices
Preceded by Elizabeth Bunn	Secretary-Treasurer of the United Auto Workers; 2010–2014	Succeeded by Gary Casteel
Preceded by Bob King	President of the United Auto Workers; 2014–2018	Succeeded by Gary Jones
