= Leonard Woodcock =

American labor leader and diplomat

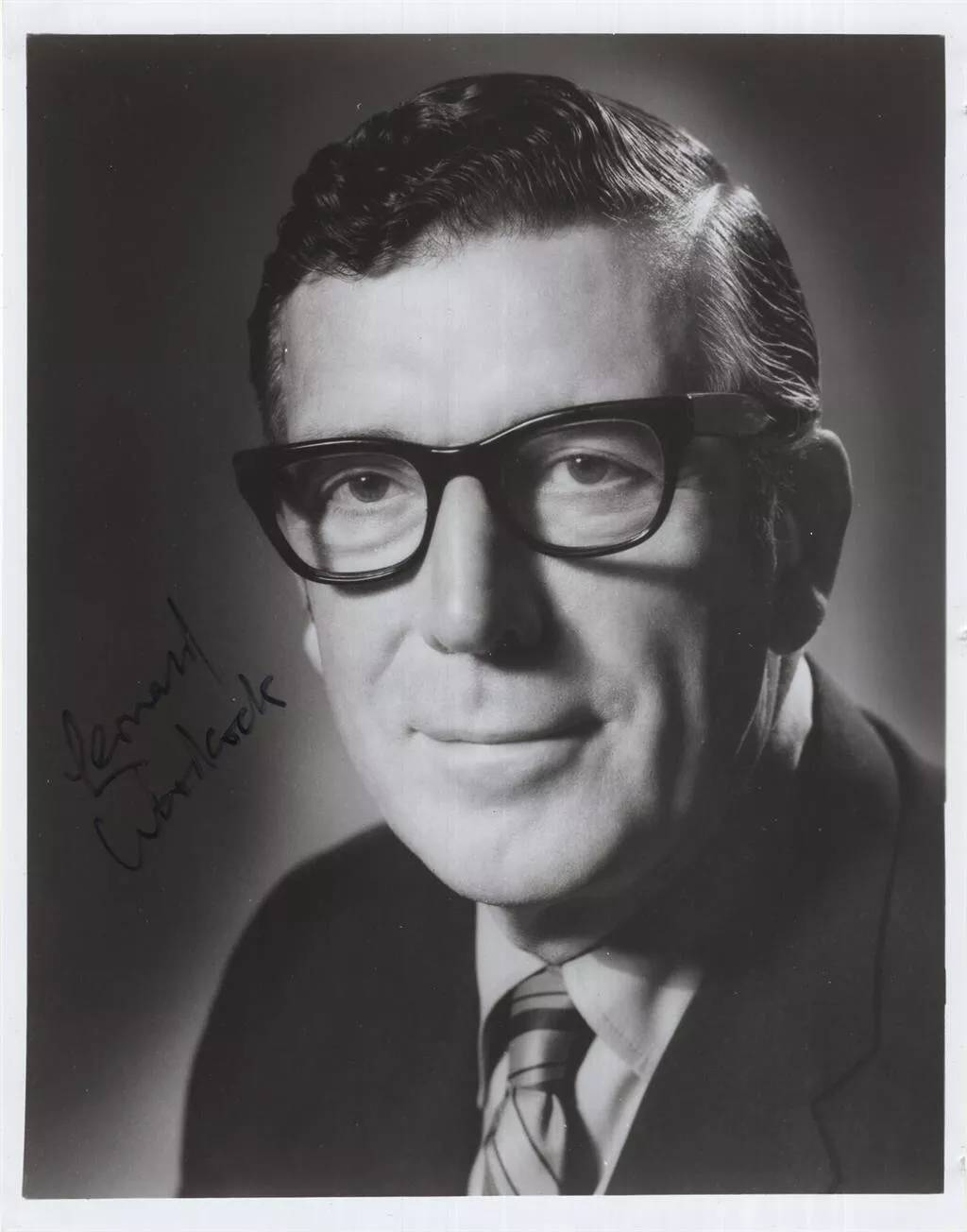
- Woodcock c. 1971

1st United States Ambassador to the People's Republic of China
- In office February 27, 1979 – February 13, 1981
- President: Jimmy Carter; Ronald Reagan
- Preceded by: Himself as Chief of the U.S. Liaison Office
- Succeeded by: Arthur W. Hummel, Jr.

Chief of the U.S. Liaison Office in Beijing
- In office July 26, 1977 – February 27, 1979
- President: Jimmy Carter
- Preceded by: Thomas S. Gates, Jr.
- Succeeded by: Himself as Ambassador to China

5th President of the United Auto Workers
- In office May 9, 1970 – May 19, 1977
- Preceded by: Walter Reuther
- Succeeded by: Douglas Fraser

Personal details
- Born: February 15, 1911 Providence, Rhode Island, U.S.
- Died: January 16, 2001 (aged 89) Ann Arbor, Michigan, U.S.
- Party: Democratic
- Spouses: Lola A. Martin (m. 1941); Sharon Tuohy (m. 1978–2001)
- Children: 3
- Education: College of the City of Detroit

Leonard Freel Woodcock (February 15, 1911 – January 16, 2001) was President of the United Auto Workers (UAW) and the first US ambassador to the People's Republic of China after being the last Chief of the US Liaison Office in Beijing.

== Early life ==
Woodcock was born in Providence, Rhode Island, in 1911. He was the son of Ernest Woodcock and Margaret Freel. At the outbreak of World War I, the family was living in Germany, and Ernest was interned. While Leonard had been born in the United States, his parents were British. Both mother and son returned to the United Kingdom for the duration of the war, where he attended school.

The family members were eventually reunited and sought a new life in North America. Originally settled in Canada, they relocated a few years later to Detroit, Michigan.

== Early career ==
The pressures of the Great Depression led Woodcock to drop out of College of the City of Detroit in 1933. He found work as a machine assembler in Detroit, and both he and his father became involved in the union movement. Woodcock became International Vice President in 1955.

== UAW president ==
In 1970, he became UAW president, succeeding Walter Reuther, who died in a plane crash.

Woodcock was an active participant in the Civil Rights Movement, marching with Martin Luther King Jr. and adding his voice and political clout to the cause. He was a champion of both minority and women's rights, pushing for comprehensive nondiscrimination rules and introducing the first union-wide contracted maternity leave in the United States.

Woodcock appeared on Nixon's enemies list at #9 while he was UAW president with the annotation "No comments necessary."

== China ==
In 1977, Woodcock retired from the union and was named by President Jimmy Carter as head of the United States Liaison Office in Beijing, which, in the absence of full diplomatic relations, served as the de facto U.S. embassy in the People's Republic of China. During the same period, Woodcock was charged with leading a special delegation to Laos and Vietnam in search of US soldiers who were prisoners-of-war or missing in action.

After leading negotiations to establish full diplomatic relations with the People's Republic of China in 1979, Woodcock was appointed the first US ambassador there. He was the first ambassador to Mainland China since 1949, when Leighton Stuart served as ambassador to the Republic of China. Though some questioned appointing a labor leader to head the delicate diplomatic mission, Carter insisted that he needed a negotiator.

In a 2000 speech at the White House to celebrate 20 years of Most Favored Nation status, Carter said:

One of the choices I had to make was whom to send to China to begin the secret negotiations with Deng Xiaoping; he was the unquestioned ruler of the nation. And I chose a man who was the senior statesman of the American labor movement, Leonard Woodcock—respected by, I guess, every working man and woman who was a member of a union or not in this country, and he was also respected by all those who had dealt with him from the management side. And he was my personal representative in Beijing.
Leonard Woodcock, working directly with me from the White House, negotiated successfully the terms for normalization of diplomatic relations. And on the first day of January, 1979, we formed those relationships. That year, Leonard Woodcock, still highly conversant with, and whose heart was attuned to, the labor movement of America, negotiated the first trade agreement, Most Favored Nations agreement, with China, in 1979. And now for 20 years, each year the Congress has confirmed his decision, and mine.

== Personal life ==
Woodcock married Loula Martin, with whom he had three children, in 1941. He was remarried in 1978, to Sharon Tuohy, a nurse working with the American delegation in China. He later taught political science at the University of Michigan, living in Ann Arbor with Sharon until his death on January 16, 2001.

Woodcock had three children, Leslie Woodcock Tentler (professor of history), Janet Woodcock (photographer) and John Woodcock (ret. Lt Col, USAF); two daughters-in-law (Carol, framer, partner of Janet and Susan, married to John) and a son-in-law (Thomas Tentler, professor of history); and three grandchildren, Sarah Tentler (speechwriter and political advisor), Daniel Tentler (lawyer) and Gregory Tentler (professor of art history).

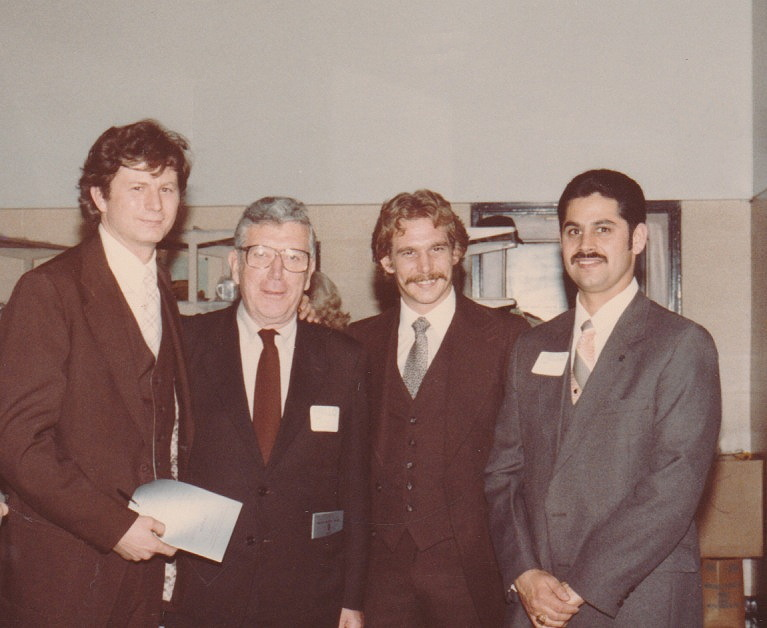
Woodcock and UAW shop committee, ca. 1981

== Archival records ==
The archival records of Woodcock can be found mostly at the Walter P. Reuther Library of Labor and Urban Affairs. Notable are the UAW President's Office: Leonard Woodcock Records and UAW Vice-President’s Office: Leonard Woodcock Records, two extensive collections that document his time as an executive with the UAW. The materials include Woodcock’s personal correspondence, photographs, official memorandum, and other various record types. Additional repositories with historical materials chronicling Woodcock are the Bentley Historical Library and the Jimmy Carter Library and Museum.

Diplomatic posts
| Preceded by post created | United States Ambassador to China; 1979–1981 | Succeeded by Arthur W. Hummel, Jr. |
| Preceded by Walter Reuther | President, United Auto Workers; 1970-1977 | Succeeded by Douglas Fraser |
