= Ron Gettelfinger =

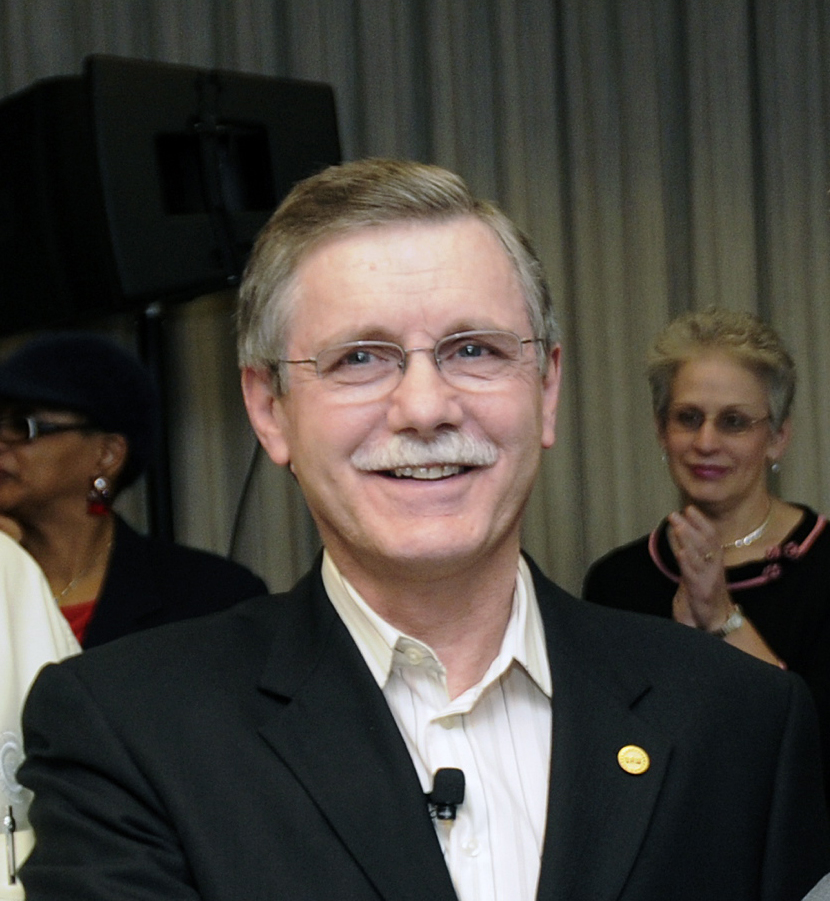
- Ron Gettelfinger in 2007

President of the United Auto Workers
- In office 2002–2010
- Preceded by: Stephen Yokich
- Succeeded by: Bob King

Personal details
- Born: August 1, 1944 (age 81)

Ronald A. Gettelfinger (born August 1, 1944) is an American retired labor leader. He served as president of the United Auto Workers from 2002 to 2010.

== Early career and education ==
Gettelfinger started his union involvement in 1964 in Louisville, Kentucky, at the Louisville Assembly Plant run by Ford Motor Company while working as a chassis line repairman. Gettelfinger is a 1976 graduate of Indiana University Southeast in New Albany, Indiana.

The workers at Ford's Louisville Assembly plant elected Gettelfinger to represent them as committeeperson, bargaining chair and president. He was elected president of local union 862 in 1984. In 1987, he became a member of the Ford-UAW bargaining committee.

Afterwards, he held other positions: director of UAW Region 3 and the UAW chaplaincy program. For six years he served as the elected director of UAW Region 3, which represents UAW members in Indiana and Kentucky, before being elected a UAW vice president in 1998.

== UAW presidency ==
Gettelfinger was elected to his first term as president of the UAW at the 33rd Convention in 2002. He was elected to a second term on June 14, 2006, at the UAW's 34th Convention in Las Vegas. On March 19, 2009, Gettelfinger announced he intended to retire at the end of his term and would not run for reelection in 2010.

Gettelfinger is an outspoken advocate for national single-payer health care in the United States. Under Gettelfinger's leadership, the UAW lobbied for fair trade agreements that included provisions for workers' rights and environmental provisions; and the union loudly criticized what it calls "the corporate global chase for the lowest wage which creates a race to the bottom that no workers, in any country, can win". He opposed any additional worker concessions until the then-current contract expired in 2011.

Gettelfinger was an elector for Barack Obama in 2008.

== Personal life and public image ==
Described in 2010 as one of the most influential figures in the auto industry at the time, Gettelfinger was known as "the chaplain" for his abstinence from alcohol and smoking.

Trade union offices
Preceded by Stephen Yokich	President of the United Auto Workers; 2002–2010	Succeeded by Bob King
