= United Auto Workers =

American labor union

- International Union, United Automobile, Aerospace and Agricultural Implement Workers of America
- Abbreviation: UAW
- Formation: August 26, 1935; 91 years ago
- Type: Trade union
- Headquarters: Detroit, Michigan, US
- Locations: United States; Ontario, Canada
- Members: 391,000 (active); 580,000 (retired); (2022)
- President: Shawn Fain
- Secessions: Canadian Auto Workers
- Affiliations: AFL–CIO; Canadian Labour Congress; IndustriALL Global Union
- Revenue: $288 million (2020)
- Endowment: $1.027 billion (2020)
- Website: uaw.org

The United Auto Workers (UAW), fully named International Union, United Automobile, Aerospace and Agricultural Implement Workers of America, is an American labor union that represents workers in the United States (including Puerto Rico) and southern Ontario, Canada.

It was founded as part of the Congress of Industrial Organizations (CIO) in the 1930s and grew rapidly from 1936 to the 1950s. The union played a major role in the liberal wing of the Democratic Party under the leadership of Walter Reuther (president 1946–1970). It was known for gaining high wages and pensions for automotive manufacturing workers, but it was unable to unionize auto plants built by foreign-based car makers in the South after the 1970s, and it went into a steady decline in membership; reasons for this included increased automation, decreased use of labor, mismanagement, movements of manufacturing (including reaction to NAFTA), and increased globalization. After a successful strike at the Big Three in 2023, the union organized its first foreign plant (VW) in 2024.

UAW members in the 21st century work in industries including autos and auto parts, health care, casino gambling, and higher education. The union is headquartered in Detroit, Michigan. As of February 24, 2022, the UAW has more than 391,000 active members and more than 580,000 retired members in over 600 local unions and holds 1,150 contracts with some 1,600 employers. It holds assets amounting to just over $1 billion.

== History ==
=== Background and founding ===
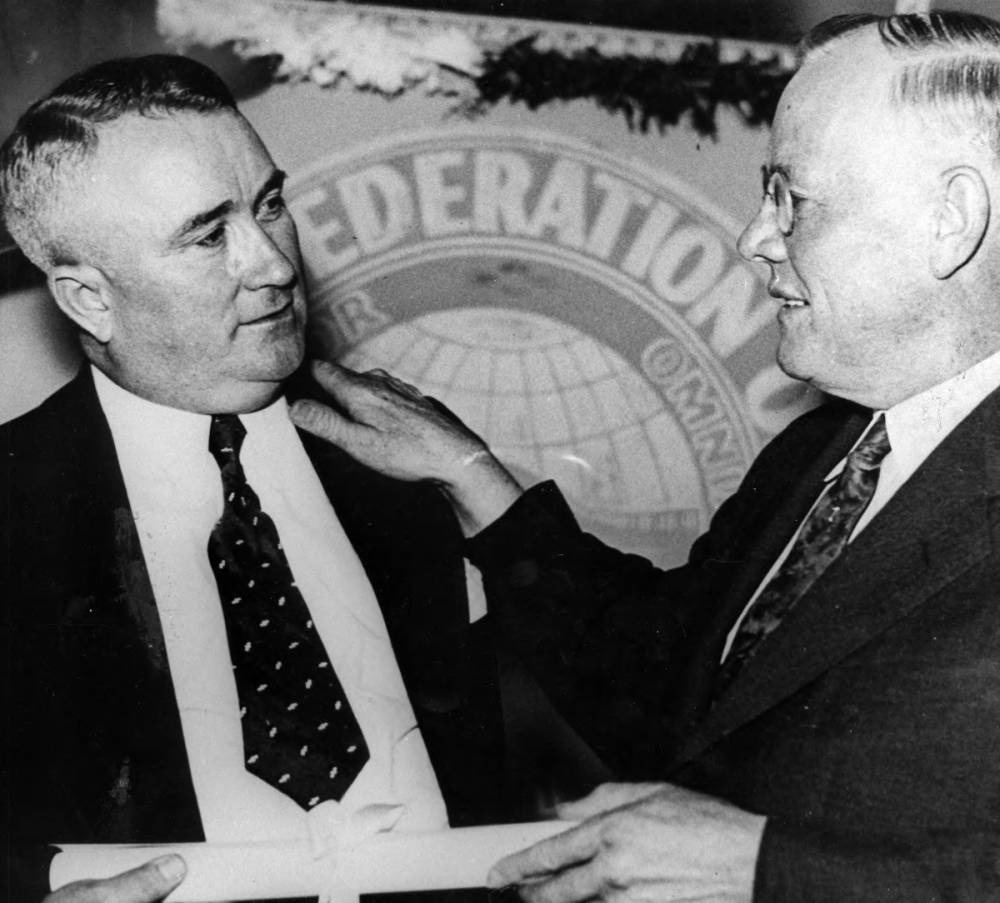
William Green, president of the American Federation of Labor (right), presents Francis J. Dillon with the international charter establishing the United Automobile Workers of America in Detroit, Michigan. August 27, 1935.

The UAW was born out of an organizing drive by the American Federation of Labor (AFL). The AFL had traditionally focused on organizing skilled workers practicing specific trades, an approach known as craft unionism. Because most automobile workers were not skilled, as of the early 1930s, they were largely not unionized. This changed following the passage of the National Industrial Recovery Act in 1933. AFL president William Green decided to begin recruiting unskilled and semi-skilled workers. He planned to organize workers at each factory into a temporary "federal labor union" (FLU), whose members would then be divided up amongst the AFL's various craft unions. He sent William Collins to Detroit (the center of the automobile industry) to begin the effort. Collins was hampered by an insufficiently militant program, a lack of organizing funds, fear of retaliation among the workers, distrust from Black and foreign workers, and strong opposition from the automobile companies. By 1935, the majority of members of the FLU had been recruited by militant local activists taking their own initiative at plants outside Michigan. These militant local unions opposed the AFL's plan to divide their members into different craft unions. They began advocating for the immediate creation of an automobile workers' union covering the entire industry. After the Toledo local led an unauthorized but successful strike against General Motors (GM), the AFL caved to pressure and called for a convention.

The UAW's founding convention began on August 26, 1935 in Detroit. The total membership of its constituent unions was 25,769. The AFL attempted to keep control of the union by pushing through a charter that denied the rank-and-file the right to elect their own officers. Militant local unions quickly managed to overturn that situation, and the struggle alienated the UAW from the AFL leadership. The UAW joined John L. Lewis's caucus of industrial unions, the Committee for Industrial Organization, in 1936. When the AFL expelled the industrial unions in 1938, it joined the new Congress of Industrial Organizations (CIO).

=== Organizing the Big Three ===
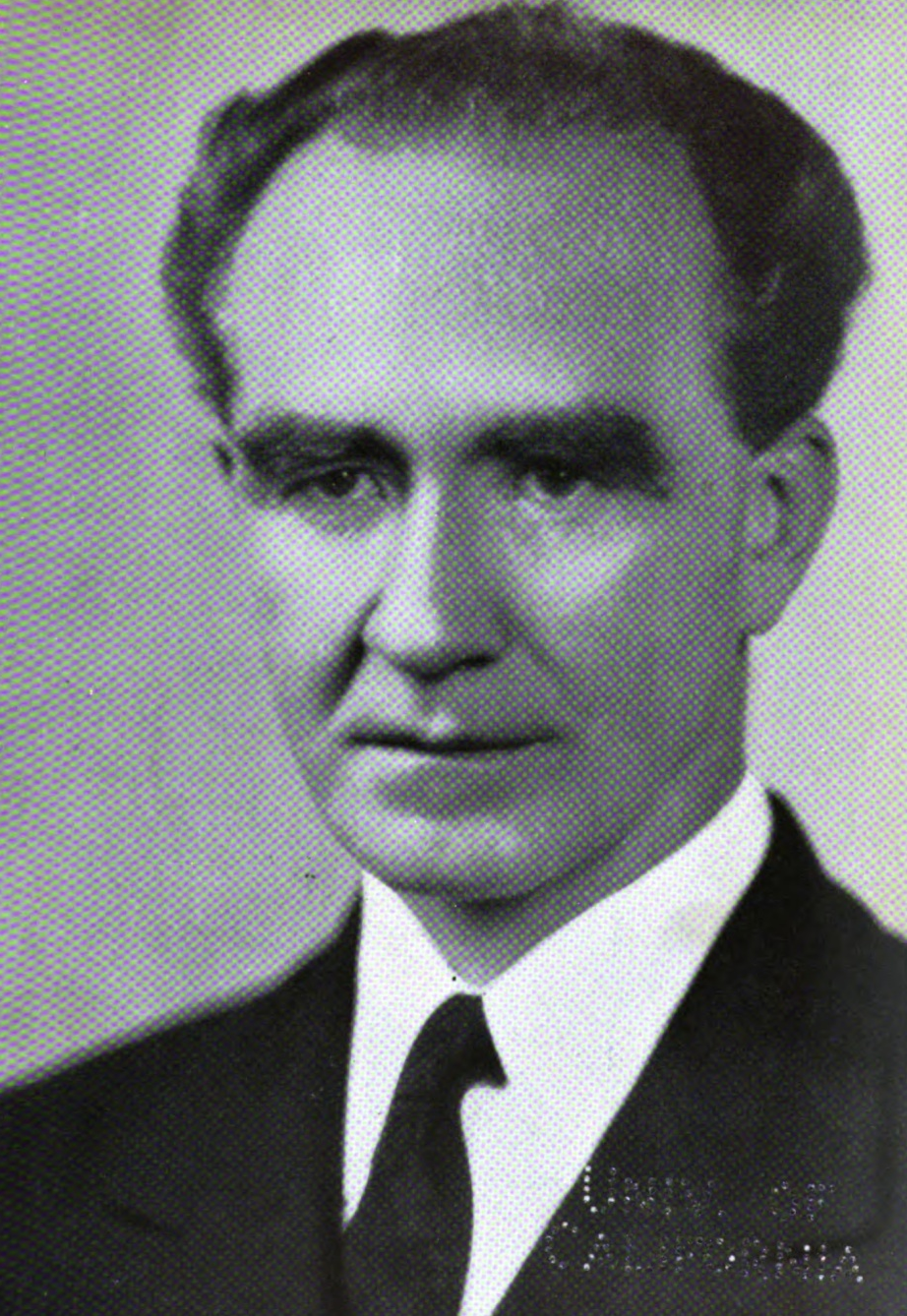
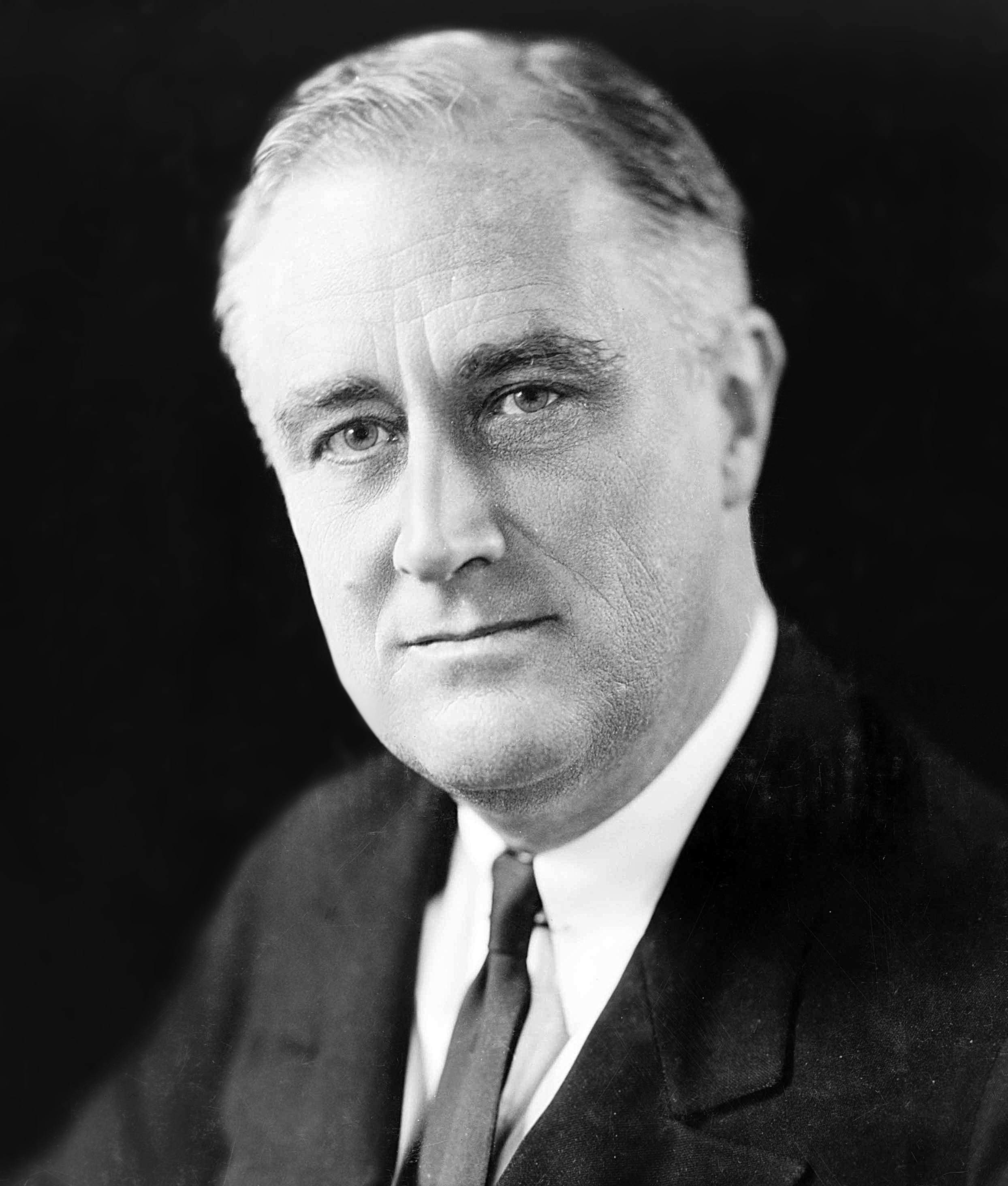
Michigan governor Frank Murphy (left) and president Franklin D. Roosevelt (right), both sympathized with General Motors workers during the Flint sit-down strike.

The UAW's fortunes began to improve after it began organizing on an industrial basis. The union found rapid success with the sitdown strike, a tactic where workers "sit down" at their work stations to occupy a factory. Sitdown strikes enabled small numbers of workers to interrupt the assembly line and stop production across an entire plant. Likewise, it projected power outwards from the factory across the entire supply chain: "just as a militant minority could stop production in an entire plant, so if the plant was a key link in an integrated corporate empire, its occupation could paralyze the corporation." After winning sitdown strikes at General Motors (GM) plants in Atlanta and Kansas City, the UAW began to demand to represent General Motors workers nationwide. Their efforts culminated in the famous Flint sit-down strike, which began on December 30, 1936. By January 25, strikes and the effects of production shutdowns idled 150,000 workers at fifty General Motors plants from California to New York. Strikers repelled the efforts of the police and National Guard to retake them. On February 11, 1937, General Motors agreed to bargain with the UAW, and eventually recognized the UAW as a bargaining agent under the newly adopted National Labor Relations Act. This recognition marked a turning point in the growth of the UAW and organized labor unions more generally. The next month, auto workers at Chrysler won recognition of the UAW as their representative in a sitdown strike. By mid-1937 the new union claimed 150,000 members and was spreading through the auto and parts manufacturing towns of Michigan, Ohio, Indiana, and Illinois.

The Ford Motor Company was the last of the "Big Three" automakers to recognize the UAW. Henry Ford and his security manager, Harry Bennett, used brute force to keep the union out of Ford. They set up the Ford Service Department to spy on and intimidate workers. At the Battle of the Overpass, Ford Service Department personnel beat union organizers in front of news photographers. Despite Ford's attempts to destroy them, photographs of the incident reached the press and helped turn public opinion against the company. However, Ford continued to refuse to sign a contract. The UAW's cause was hindered by its weakness with Black workers. Older Black workers felt loyalty to Henry Ford because he had hired and paid them well at a time when other auto companies would not. Furthermore, many feared that Black workers were being asked to risk their jobs but would be "pushed aside and ignored" once the union had secured their votes. It took four years of organizing efforts for the UAW to win the right to represent Ford employees. On May 21, 1941, following a strike at Ford's Rouge plant, a decisive majority of employees, including most Black employees, voted to join the UAW. The UAW extracted a better deal from Ford than from other automakers, including pay increases, a closed shop, and rehiring of pro-union workers. The agreement also included a non-discrimination clause drafted by Shelton Tappes, a Black foundryman who had served on the UAW negotiating team.

Communists provided many of the organizers and led some key union locals, especially Local 600 which represented the largest Ford plants. The Communist faction had some key positions in the union, including the directorship of the Washington office, the research department, and the legal office. Walter Reuther at times cooperated closely with the Communists, but he and his allies formed strategically an anticommunist current within the UAW. The UAW discovered that it had to be able to uphold its side of a bargain if it was to be a successful bargaining agency with a corporation, which meant that wildcat strikes and disruptive behavior by union members had to be stopped by the union itself. According to one writer, many UAW members were extreme individualists who did not like being bossed around by company foremen or by union agents. Leaders of the UAW realized that they had to control the shop floor, as Reuther explained in 1939: "We must demonstrate that we are a disciplined, responsible organization; we not only have power, but that we have power under control."

=== World War II ===
World War II dramatically changed the nature of the UAW's organizing. The UAW's executive board voted to make a "no strike" pledge to ensure that the war effort would not be hindered by strikes. A vehement minority opposed the decision, but the pledge was later reaffirmed by the membership. As war production ramped up and auto factories converted to tank building, the UAW organized new locals in these factories and airplane manufacturers across the country and hit a peak membership of over a million members in 1944. That same year, Lillian Hatcher was appointed the first Black female international representative of the UAW.

=== Postwar ===
The UAW struck GM for 113 days, beginning in November 1945, demanding a greater voice in management. GM would pay higher wages, but refused to consider power sharing; the union finally settled with an eighteen-and-a-half-cent wage increase and little more. The UAW went along with GM in return for an ever-increasing packages of wage and benefit hikes through collective bargaining, with no help from the government.

=== New leadership ===
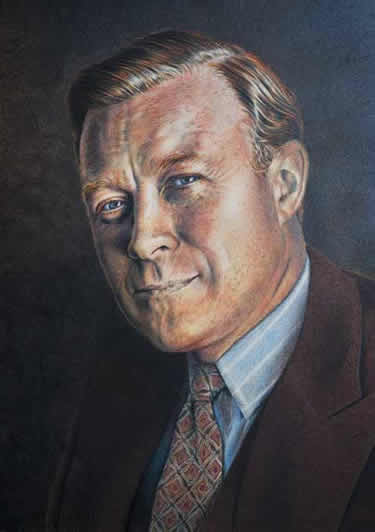
This portrait of Walter Reuther commemorated his induction into the Labor Hall of Honor at the U.S. Department of Labor.

Walter Reuther won the election for president at the UAW's constitutional convention in 1946 and served until his death in an airplane accident in May 1970. Reuther led the union during one of the most prosperous periods for workers in U.S. history. Immediately after the war, left-wing elements demanded "30–40", which is a 30-hour week for 40 hours pay. Reuther rejected 30–40 and decided to concentrate on total annual wages, displaying a new corporatist mentality that accepted management's argument that shorter hours conflicted with wage increases and other job benefits and abandoning the old confrontational syndicalist position that shorter hours drove up wages and protected against unemployment. The UAW delivered contracts for his membership through negotiation. Reuther would pick one of the Big Three automakers (General Motors, Ford, and Chrysler), and if it did not offer concessions, he would strike it and let the other two absorb its sales. Besides high hourly wage rates and paid vacations, in 1950, Reuther negotiated an industry first contract with General Motors known as Reuther's Treaty of Detroit. The UAW negotiated employer-funded pensions at Chrysler, medical insurance at GM, and in 1955 supplementary unemployment benefits at Ford. Many smaller suppliers followed suit with benefits.

Reuther tried to negotiate lower automobile prices for the consumer with each contract, with limited success. An agreement on profit sharing with American Motors led nowhere, because profits were small at this minor player. The UAW expanded its scope to include workers in other major industries such as the aerospace and agricultural-implement industries.

The UAW disaffiliated from the AFL–CIO on July 1, 1968, after Reuther and AFL–CIO president George Meany could not come to agreement on a wide range of policy issues or reforms to AFL–CIO governance. On July 24, 1968, just days after the UAW disaffiliation, Teamsters general president Frank Fitzsimmons and Reuther formed the Alliance for Labor Action as a new national trade union center to organize unorganized workers and pursue leftist political and social projects. Meany denounced the ALA as a dual union, although Reuther argued it was not. The Alliance's initial program was ambitious. Reuther's death in a plane crash on May 9, 1970, near Black Lake, Michigan, dealt a serious blow to the Alliance, and the group halted operations in July 1971 after the Auto Workers (almost bankrupt from a lengthy strike at General Motors) was unable to continue to fund its operations.

In 1948, the UAW founded the radio station WDET 101.9 FM in Detroit. It was sold to Wayne State University for $1 in 1952.

=== Politics and dissent ===
The UAW leadership supported the programs of the New Deal Coalition, strongly supported civil rights, and strongly supported Lyndon Johnson's Great Society. The UAW became strongly anti-communist after it expelled its Communist leaders in the late 1940s following the Taft–Hartley Act, and supported the Vietnam War and opposed the antiwar Democratic candidates.

The UAW had positioned itself as an ally of the civil rights movement. Walter Reuther marched alongside Martin Luther King Jr. at the 1963 March on Washington. Marc Stepp, Vice President of the UAW, from 1974-1989, was able to articulate the daily struggles of Black auto workers who face exclusion, discrimination, and instability on the job. Stepp also advocated for the incorporation of affirmative action into union contracts and pushed the UAW to hold employees accountable for antidiscrimination clauses.

According to political scientist Charles Williams, the UAW used the rhetoric of civic or liberal nationalism to fight for the rights of Black workers and other workers of color between the 1930s and 1970s. At the same time, it used this rhetoric to simultaneously rebuff the demands and limit the organizing efforts of Black workers seeking to overcome institutional racial hierarchies in the workplace, housing, and the UAW. The UAW leadership denounced these demands and efforts as antidemocratic and anti-American. Three examples, Williams argues, show how the UAW's use of working class nationalism functioned as a counter subversive tradition within American liberalism: the UAW campaign at the Ford plant in Dearborn, Michigan, in the late 1930s, the 1942 conflict in Detroit over the black occupancy of the Sojourner Truth housing project, and the responses of the UAW under the conservative leadership of Reuther to the demands of Black workers for representation in UAW leadership between the mid-1940s and the 1960s. See also League of Revolutionary Black Workers and Dodge Revolutionary Union Movement for the history of Black workers who questioned the corrupt leadership of the UAW in the 1960s and the 1970s.

The UAW was the most instrumental outside financial and operational supporter of the first Earth Day in 1970. According to Denis Hayes, Earth Day's first national coordinator, "Without the UAW, the first Earth Day would have likely flopped!"

=== 1970-2010 ===
With the 1973 oil embargo, rising fuel prices caused the U.S. auto makers to lose market share to foreign manufacturers who placed more emphasis on fuel efficiency. This started years of layoffs and wage reductions, and the UAW found itself in the position of giving up many of the benefits it had won for workers over the decades. By the early 1980s, auto producing states, especially in the Midwestern United States and Canada, had been impacted economically from losses in jobs and income. This peaked with the near-bankruptcy of Chrysler in 1979. In 1985, the union's Canadian division disaffiliated from the UAW over a dispute regarding negotiation tactics and formed the Canadian Auto Workers as an independent union. Specifically, the Canadian division claimed they were being used to pressure the companies for extra benefits, which went mostly to the American members.

The UAW saw a loss of membership after the 1970s. Membership topped 1.5 million in 1979, falling to 540,000 in 2006. With the late-2000s recession and automotive industry crisis of 2008–10, GM and Chrysler filed for Chapter 11 reorganization. Membership fell to 390,000 active members in 2010, with more than 600,000 retired members covered by pension and medical care plans.

=== Early 21st century ===
A "UAW supports Barack Obama" campaign sign in October 2008. Obama's opposition to outsourcing and his positions on manufacturing and trade contributed to the union's endorsement of him for president.

UAW has been credited for aiding in the auto industry rebound in the 21st century and blamed for seeking generous benefit packages in the past which in part led to the automotive industry crisis of 2008–10. UAW workers receiving generous benefit packages when compared with those working at non-union Japanese auto assembly plants in the U.S., had been cited as a primary reason for the cost differential before the 2009 restructuring. In a November 2008 New York Times editorial, Andrew Ross Sorkin claimed that the average UAW worker was paid $70 per hour, including health and pension costs, while Toyota workers in the US receive $10 to $20 less. The UAW asserts that most of this labor cost disparity comes from legacy pension and healthcare benefits to retired members, of which the Japanese automakers have none.

The Big Three already sold each of their cars for about $2,500 less than equivalent cars from Japanese companies, analysts at the International Motor Vehicle Program said. According to the 2007 GM Annual Report, typical autoworkers earned a base wage of approximately $28 per hour. Following the 2007 National Agreement, the base starting wage was lowered to about $15 per hour. A second-tier wage of $14.50 an hour, which applies only to newly hired workers, is lower than the average wage in non-union auto companies in the Deep South.

One of the benefits negotiated by the United Auto Workers was the former jobs bank program, under which laid-off members once received 95 percent of their take-home pay and benefits. More than 12,000 UAW members were paid this benefit in 2005. In December 2008, the UAW agreed to suspend the program as a concession to help U.S. automakers during the auto industry crisis.

UAW leadership granted concessions to its unions in order to win labor peace, a benefit not calculated by the UAW's many critics. The UAW has claimed that the primary cause of the automotive sector's weakness was substantially more expensive fuel costs linked to the 2003-2008 oil crisis which caused customers to turn away from large sport utility vehicles (SUVs) and pickup trucks, the main market of the American Big Three. In 2008, the situation became critical because the Great Recession significantly impaired the ability of consumers to purchase automobiles. The Big Three also based their respective market strategies on fuel-inefficient SUVs, and suffered from lower quality perception (vis-a-vis automobiles manufactured by Japanese or European car makers). Accordingly, the Big Three directed vehicle development focused on light trucks (which had better profit margins) in order to offset the considerably higher labor costs, falling considerably behind in the sedan market segments to Japanese and European automakers.

The UAW has tried to expand membership by organizing the employees outside of the Big Three. In 2010, Bob King hired Richard Bensinger to organize Japanese, Korean, and German transplant factories in the United States.

In a representational election following a majority of the workers signing cards asking for UAW representation, in February 2014 workers at Volkswagen's Chattanooga, Tennessee, plant narrowly voted down the union 712 to 626. However, the UAW organized a minority union Local 42, which was voluntary and does not collect dues. After the close vote against the UAW, Volkswagen announced a new policy allowing groups representing at least 15% of the workforce to participate in meetings, with higher access tiers for groups representing 30% and 45% of employees. This prompted anti-UAW workers who opposed the first vote to form a rival union, the American Council of Employees. In December 2014 the UAW was certified as representing more than 45% of employees.

The union engages in Michigan state politics. President King was a vocal opponent of the right-to-work legislation that passed over the objection of organized labor in December 2012. The UAW also remains a major player in the state Democratic Party.

In March 2020, the Detroit United Auto Workers union announced that after discussion with the leaders of General Motors, Ford, and Fiat Chrysler Automobiles, the carmakers would partially shut down factories on a "rotating" basis to combat the COVID-19 pandemic.

Though primarily known for autoworkers, academic staff comprised 1 quarter of UAW membership in 2022, and the 2022 University of California academic workers' strike achieved higher pay for that UAW affiliate.

Between 2022 and 2025, the UAW began representing the employees of 3 electric vehicle battery joint ventures in the United States, all partially owned by South Korean battery makers. BlueOval SK contested the results of its 2025 vote, even as it announced the layoffs of its entire workforce later that year.

=== Corruption and reform ===
A corruption probe by the Justice Department against UAW and 3 Fiat Chrysler executives was conducted during 2020 regarding several charges such as racketeering, embezzlement, and tax evasion. It resulted in convictions of 12 union officials and 3 Fiat Chrysler executives, including two former union presidents, UAW paying back over $15 million in improper chargebacks to worker training centers, payment of $1.5 million to the IRS to settle tax issues, commitment to independent oversight for six years, and a referendum that reformed the election mode for leadership. The "One Member One Vote" referendum vote in 2022 determined that UAW members could directly elect the members of the UAW International Executive Board (IEB), the highest ruling body of the UAW.

Shawn Fain won the 2022–23 United Auto Workers international union election, on a low turnout of only 9 percent of the membership. Since then, the federal monitor has continued corruption investigations. In 2024, a district court ordered the UAW to stop obstructing investigations. In 2025, the monitor reported on threats and retaliation in the UAW leadership with Fain allegedly threatening to "slit the fucking throats" of anyone who messed with his staff, and orchestrating retaliation against secretary-treasurer Margaret Mock for refusing to authorize some expenses. Fain's conflict with Mock resulted in an ongoing, internal disciplinary process after six locals voted to approve charges against Fain.

=== 2023 strike ===
A strike against all big three automakers began on September 15, 2023, for the first time in UAW history. After nearly a month and a half of strikes, UAW was able to reach an agreement with all three carmakers after securing record concessions from them. After the success of the strike, in November 2023, the UAW announced that it was launching a simultaneous campaign to unionize 150,000 workers at other automakers with plants in the United States: BMW, Honda, Hyundai, Lucid, Mazda, Mercedes, Nissan, Rivian, Subaru, Tesla, Toyota, Volkswagen, and Volvo. The UAW represented 145,000 at GM, Ford & Stellantis.

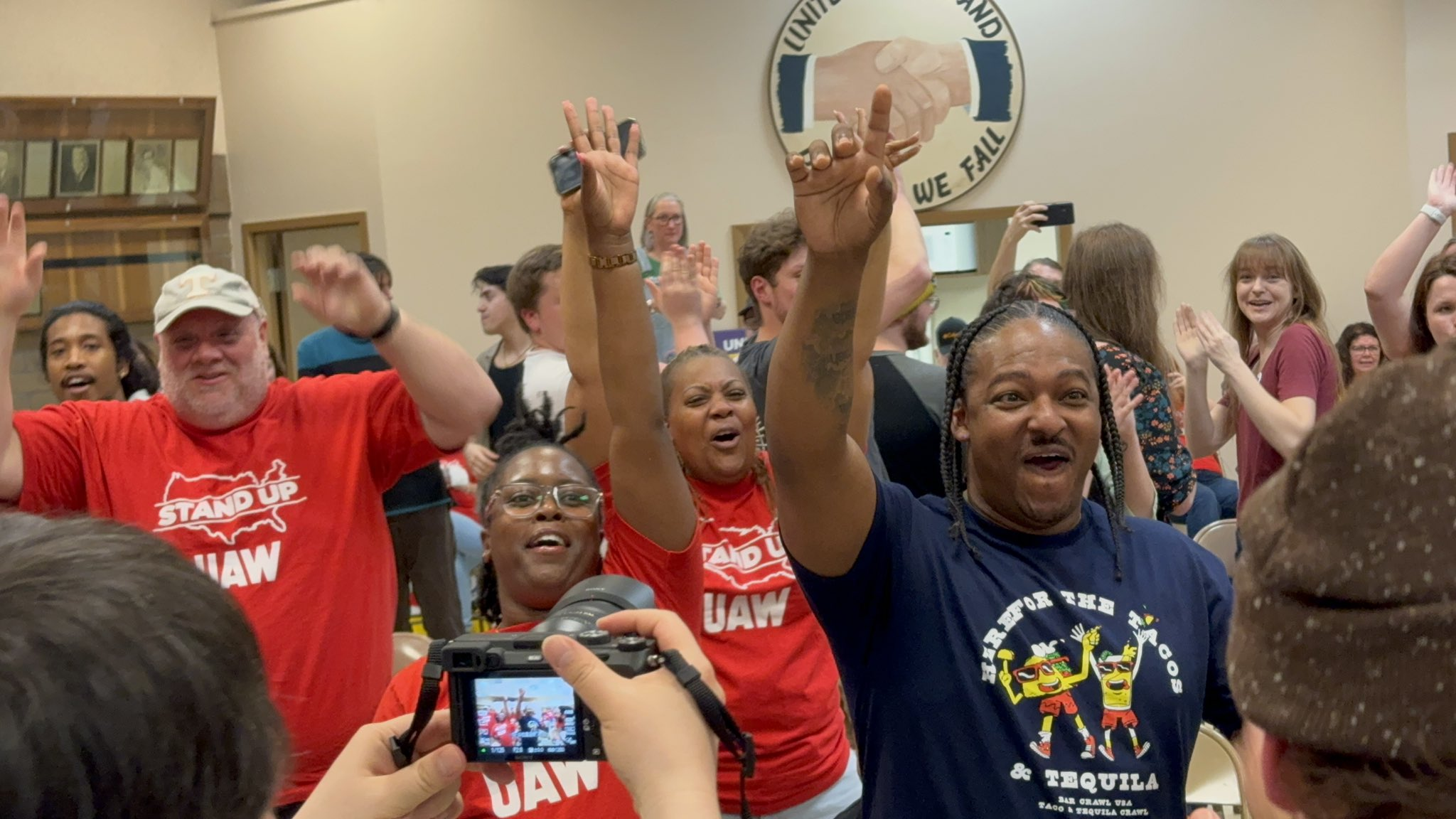
Volkswagen workers celebrating in Chattanooga, Tennessee, after a successful UAW vote on April 19, 2024.

In April 2024, after two failed attempts, 73% of workers at the Volkswagen (VW) Chattanooga, Tennessee plant voted to join the UAW, the union's first victory in the South outside Detroit's Big Three.

== Technical, Office, and Professional (TOP) workers ==
District 65, a former affiliate of the Retail, Wholesale and Department Store Union that included as a predecessor the United Office and Professional Workers of America, merged into the UAW in 1989.

In 2008, the 6,500 postdoctoral scholars (postdocs) at the ten campuses of the University of California, who, combined, account for 10% of the postdocs in the US, voted to affiliate with the UAW, creating the largest union for postdoctoral scholars in the country: UAW Local 5810. The expansion of UAW to academic circles, postdoctoral researchers in particular, was significant in that the move helped secure advances in pay that made unionized academic researchers among the best compensated in the country in addition to gaining unprecedented rights and protections.

== Leadership ==
=== Presidents ===
Symbols

^{†} Died in office

List of presidents of the UAW
No.	Portrait	Name	Term of office			Ref.
No.	Portrait	Name	Took office	Left office	Time in office	Ref.
1	Francis J. Dillon	Francis J. Dillon	August 29, 1935	April 27, 1936	242 days	(Note: For Dillon's appointment, see Bernstein 1969, p. 379 and Kraus 1993, p. 124; For his replacement, see Bernstein 1969, p. 507)
2	Homer Martin	Homer Martin	April 27, 1936	January 20, 1939 (Note: The CIO placed the UAW under effective receivership on 16 September 1938 and Martin lost his control over the union. After continued disputes with the CIO, Martin broke with the organization, splitting the UAW. Most locals remained loyal to the CIO and formed the UAW-CIO under RJ Thomas. The minority loyal to Martin went on to re-affiliate with the AFL, forming the UAW-AFL. Martin resigned as president of the splinter organization in 1940.)	2 years, 268 days	(Note: For Martin's election, see Bernstein 1969, p. 507; For his replacement, see Bernstein 1969, p. 568)
3	RJ Thomas	R. J. Thomas	January 20, 1939	March 27, 1946	7 years, 66 days	(Note: For Thomas' appointment, see Bernstein 1969, p. 568; For his defeat, see)
4	Walter Reuther	Walter Reuther	March 27, 1946	May 9, 1970^{[†]}	24 years, 43 days	
5	Leonard Woodcock	Leonard Woodcock	May 22, 1970	May 19, 1977	6 years, 362 days	
6	Douglas Fraser	Douglas Fraser	May 19, 1977	May 19, 1983	6 years, 0 days	
7	Owen Bieber	Owen Bieber	May 19, 1983	June 11, 1995	12 years, 23 days	
8		Stephen Yokich	June 11, 1995	June 5, 2002	6 years, 359 days	
9	Ron Gettelfinger	Ron Gettelfinger	June 5, 2002	June 16, 2010	8 years, 11 days	
10	Bob King	Bob King	June 16, 2010	June 5, 2014	3 years, 354 days	
11		Dennis Williams	June 5, 2014	June 14, 2018	4 years, 9 days	
12		Gary Jones	June 14, 2018	November 20, 2019	1 year, 159 days	
13		Rory Gamble	December 5, 2019	June 30, 2021	1 year, 207 days	
14	Ray Curry	Ray Curry	July 1, 2021	March 26, 2023	1 year, 268 days	
15	Shawn Fain	Shawn Fain	March 26, 2023	Incumbent	3 years, 240 days	

=== Secretary-Treasurers ===
1935: Ed Hall
1936: George Addes
1947: Emil Mazey
1980: Ray Majerus
1988: Bill Casstevens
1995: Roy Wyse
2002: Elizabeth Bunn
2010: Dennis Williams
2014: Gary Casteel
2018: Ray Curry
2021: Frank Stuglin
2022: Margaret Mock

== See also ==
- Autoworker Caravan
- Final Offer – documentary showing the 1984 UAW/CAW contract negotiations
- Leon E. Bates
- List of United Auto Workers local unions
- 2007 Freightliner wildcat strike
- 2007 General Motors strike
- 2019 General Motors strike
- Communists in the United States Labor Movement (1919–1937)
- Communists in the United States Labor Movement (1937–1950)
- Women in labor unions
