= Elizabeth Bunn =

American labor unionist

Mary Elizabeth Bunn (born 1951) is a former American labor unionist.

Bunn grew up in Detroit and was educated at Wayne State University and the University of Michigan, qualifying as an attorney. In 1985, she was appointed as an associate general counsel for the United Auto Workers (UAW) union. She also joined the National Writers Union. In 1995, she became administrative assistant to the UAW president, and then in 1998, she was elected as a vice president of the union, replacing Carolyn Forrest. The same year, she was elected as a vice-president of the AFL-CIO.

Initially directing the UAW's Women's Department, Bunn organized the Woman-to-Woman campaign in Michigan in 2000, which involved many women in political activity for the first time. She later led the Technical, Office and Professional Department, in which role she won bargaining rights for thousands of academic and healthcare workers, and employees of Kentucky. Her next role was leading the Competitive Shops/Independents, Parts, and Suppliers Department, negotiating national contracts. In 2002, she was elected as secretary-treasurer of the union, serving until 2010. She was then appointed as director of organizing for the AFL-CIO.

Trade union offices
Preceded by Roy Wyse	Secretary-Treasurer of the United Auto Workers; 2002–2010	Succeeded by Dennis Williams
