= Ray Majerus =

American labor leader (1924–1987)

Raymond E. Majerus (1924 – December 17, 1987) was an American labor leader who served as secretary-treasurer of the United Auto Workers from 1980 until his death in 1987. From 1954 to 1960, Majerus was a key figure in the Kohler strike.

== Biography ==
Majerus began working for Kohler Co. in the early 1950s. In 1952, Majerus led a wildcat strike for which he was fired. He remained involved in labor organization efforts at Kohler, however, and played a role in the decision to affiliate the company-supported Kohler Workers Association with the United Automobile Workers. When the U.A.W. won its first contract with Kohler in 1953, one of the provisions insisted that Majerus be barred from working at the plant.

Despite the ban, Majerus served as a union representative and was a key figure in the Kohler strike that lasted from 1954 to 1960. The union eventually won the strike, and Kohler was forced to give workers back pay.

In 1965, while working as a U.A.W. staff member in the Wisconsin-Minnesota region, Majerus traveled to Selma, Alabama to march for civil rights.

Majerus was elected director of the Wisconsin-Minnesota region of the U.A.W. in 1972. Eight years later, in 1980, he was elected secretary-treasurer of the United Automobile Workers, the second-highest position in the union.

In 1982, Majerus sought the presidency of the United Automobile Workers. He was an early front-runner, but ultimately lost to Owen Bieber.

In addition to his union positions, Majerus also served as a member of the Democratic National Committee from Wisconsin.

He died on December 16, 1987, of a heart attack.

== Personal life ==
He was the father of basketball coach Rick Majerus.

Trade union offices
Preceded by Emil Mazey	Secretary-Treasurer of the United Auto Workers; 1980–1987	Succeeded by Bill Casstevens
