= Stephen Yokich =

American trade unionist

8th President of the United Auto Workers
- In office June 11, 1995 – June 5, 2002
- Preceded by: Owen Bieber
- Succeeded by: Ron Gettelfinger

Personal details
- Born: August 20, 1935 Detroit, Michigan
- Died: August 16, 2002 (aged 66) Detroit, Michigan
- Occupation: Trade unionist
- Known for: President, United Auto Workers

Stephen Phillip Yokich (August 20, 1935 – August 16, 2002) was an American labor union activist who served as President of the United Auto Workers from 1994 to 2002.

== Early life and union career ==
Yokich was born in Detroit, Michigan, in August 1935 to Stephen and Julia Yokich, just six days before the first UAW convention. He is of German, Lebanese, Serbian and Syrian descent. Both of his grandfathers, most of his aunts and uncles, and his father were UAW members. When he was 22 months old, his mother (a UAW member of Local 174 who was out on strike at the Ternstedt Plant) took him to his first picket line. His father brought him to a picket line when he was six years old.

He served in the United States Air Force from 1952 to 1956, then became an apprentice in 1956 at the Heidrich Tool and Die Company in Oak Park, Michigan. He joined UAW Local 155, the same local where his father had once been shop steward. Many members of his family were members of Local 155. "Working in the same local, I went to all the meetings with my father," he said. "We would take one car, and there would be four or five of us, all riding together to go to the meetings." As the youngest apprentice, he was required to serve as the local union's recording secretary. He was elected chair of Local 155's political action committee after a year in the union. Yokich became notorious for pushing and sometimes fighting with anti-union workers, managers and others while walking the picket line during strikes. He was arrested in the late 1950s after an altercation on a strikers' picket line in Fraser, Michigan.

=== International union career ===
Walter Reuther became acquainted with Yokich after Yokich's arrest. In 1962, Yokich contradicted the legendary UAW president at a public meeting: "All we hear about is the sit-down strike and what we did in '38. We are not interested in '38. We are interested in doing our part now in making this UAW stronger than it was in '38." Reuther hired him as a UAW Region 1 staff representative in 1969. Yokich was elected Director of Region 1 in 1977.

Yokich was elected an international Vice President of the UAW in 1980 (he served five consecutive terms), and led the union's Agricultural Implement Department. While head of this department, he ordered a strike against heavy industrial machinery manufacturer Caterpillar Inc. that lasted 205 days. Critics later said that Yokich's tough public stands may have prolonged the strike. In 1983, Yokich was assigned to lead the UAW's Ford Department. Although Yokich did not generally support expanded labor-management partnerships, he pushed the UAW to participate in employee involvement programs which it had already negotiated with Ford, and later negotiated work rule changes to obtain job security for his members. At least one newspaper said Yokich helped create a "virtual overhaul of the factory floor". He was critical of what UAW leaders called "Ephilinism"—joint labor-management teams championed by UAW Vice President Donald Ephlin at the Saturn Corporation—for leading to many concessions but no job security.

Yokich led the UAW's General Motors Department from 1989 to 1995. Thirty minutes after taking over the department, he began demoting staffers he felt were ineffective at their jobs. The Detroit Free Press called his impact on General Motors "astonishing"; he significantly increased the union's presence and strength among workers at GM plants, agreed to tens of thousands of job cuts in exchange for higher wages and benefits, reined in the pace of change by calling strategically important local strikes, and built strong relationships with up-and-coming GM managers who he correctly predicted would eventually lead the company.

He attended Wayne State University for a time, but never completed his degree.

== UAW presidency ==
Stephen Yokich was elected President of the UAW in 1994.

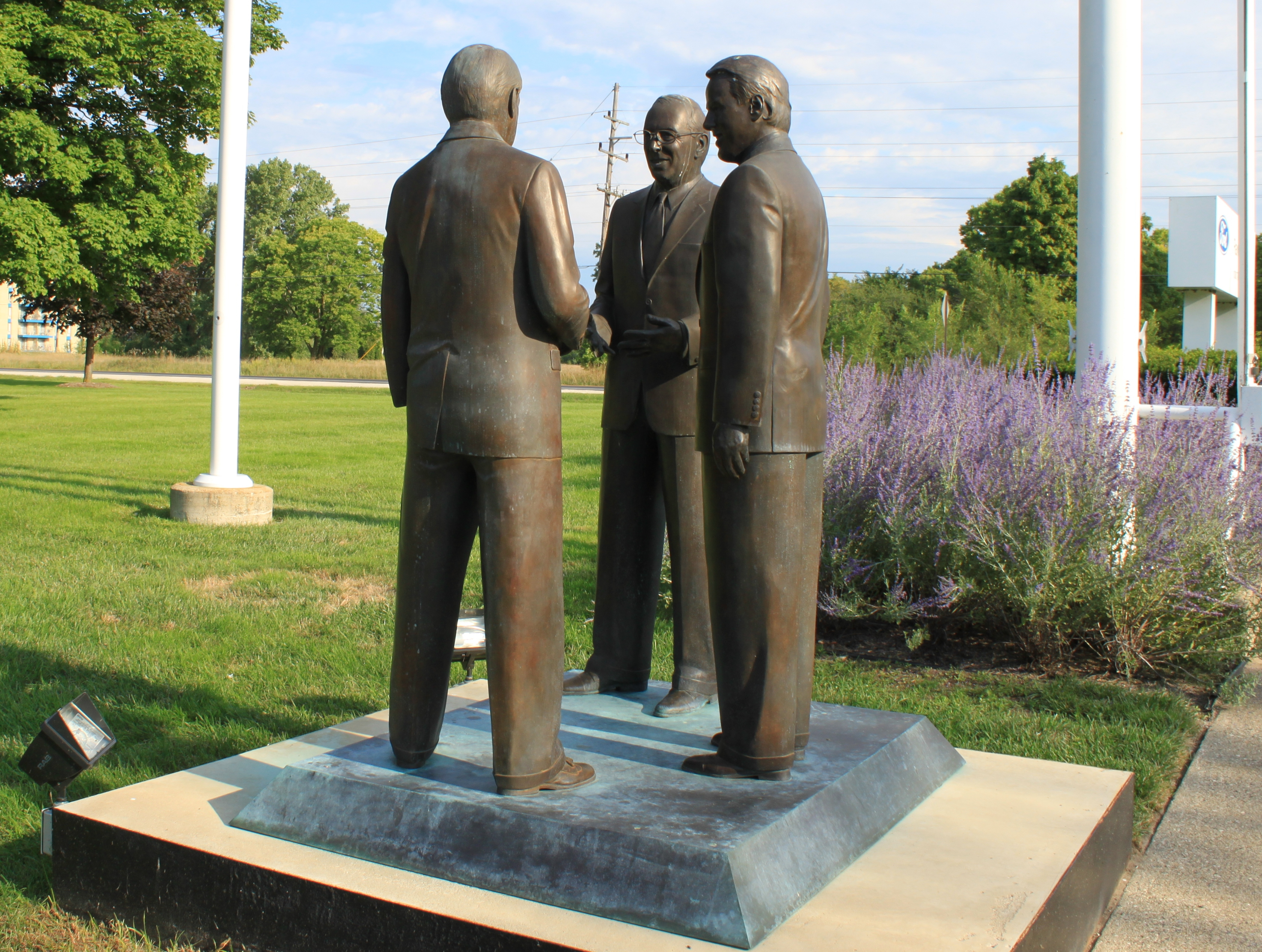
Stephen Yokich statue (middle), Ford Rawsonville Plant

He led the union out on a 54-day strike against General Motors in 1998 that the news media characterized as "bitter." It was one of five UAW strikes against the automaker that year. Yokich agreed that neither side came out ahead after the strike but defended his decision. "We had to strike to get what we already negotiated, and the burden on the employees and the community and everybody else was unreasonable." Yokich also ended a six-year strike against Caterpillar which saved the contract but led to major concessions and givebacks.

He was re-elected in 1998, and retired in 2002. During his tenure in office, he placed a greater emphasis on negotiating good contracts than on getting the union involved in national politics. He also insisted on a provision in all UAW automotive industry contracts which made federal elections a holiday for UAW members (so they could vote). David Cole, Director of the Center for Automotive Research, said Yokich accomplished two major tasks during his three terms as president of the UAW: First, he improved the union's relationship with General Motors and allowed Chrysler to downsize (helping to save the company). Second, he lengthened the union's contracts with the Big Three automakers to four years from three. The Detroit Free Press cited his push to organize workers in casinos, health care, higher education, and other groups outside the automotive industry as his greatest accomplishment.

== Death ==
Yokich began suffering from coronary artery disease in the last few years of his life. Yokich suffered a stroke at his home in Detroit on Thursday, August 15, 2002. He was admitted to St. John Hospital, and died at 9:45 A.M. the following day.

He married the former Tekla Baumgartner. The couple had a son and daughter, and lived in St. Clair Shores, Michigan. His mother, wife, and children survived him. His daughter Tracey A. Yokich was a Michigan Legislator, and is currently (as of 2024) a judge on the Circuit court located in Macomb County, Michigan.

== Memberships and awards ==
Yokich was a lifelong Democrat, a member of the NAACP and a member of the Coalition of Labor Union Women. He was a member of the steering committee of the Economic Alliance for Michigan, a trustee of the Michigan Cancer Foundation and a board member of the Father Clement Kern Foundation. He founded the Community Caring Program in 1993.

He received the Arab American of the Year Award from the Arab Community Center for Economic and Social Services in 1995 and was the co-recipient of the Chairman's Award for Vehicle Quality Improvement from J.D. Power and Associates in 1998.

== Bibliography ==
- Bennet, James. "U.A.W., Ranks Thinning, Elects a Fighter as President." The New York Times. June 15, 1995.
- "Biographical Information on Retired President Stephen Yokich." Associated Press. August 16, 2002.
- Evanoff, Ted. "UAW Head Uses Low-Key Strategy As Talks Near." Detroit Free Press. August 27, 1999.
- Franklin, Stephen. "Stephen P. Yokich, 66; Fierce Negotiator Led UAW." Chicago Tribune. August 17, 2002.
- Gallagher, John. "'Good and Honorable Man' Felled By Stroke." Detroit Free Press. August 17, 2002.
- Garsten, Ed. "Outgoing Union Leader Leaves Legacy of Protecting Workers' Rights But Failing to Organize Transplants." Associated Press. May 28, 2002.
- Konrad, Rachel. "An Evening of Mutual Admiration Leaders of Ford, UAW Cordial At Banquet." Detroit Free Press. December 3, 1998.
- Nauss, Donald W. "Rough Rider." Los Angeles Times. June 11, 1995.
- Ryan, Richard A. "Dems May Benefit From UAW Contract." Detroit News. September 24, 2000.
- Who's Who in America. 56th ed. New Providence, NJ: Marquis Who's Who, 2002.
- "Yokich Set to Retire as UAW Chief." United Press International. May 31, 2002.

Trade union offices
Preceded by Owen Bieber	President of the United Auto Workers; 1994–2002	Succeeded by Ron Gettelfinger
