= Left Out: Reds and America's Industrial Unions =

- Authors: Judith Stepan‐Norris; Maurice Zeitlin
- Subject: Labor history of the United States
- Genre: Non-fiction
- Publisher: Cambridge University Press
- Publication date: 2003
- Publication place: New York
- Media type: Hardcover; Paperback
- Pages: 375
- ISBN: 0-521-79212-6

Left Out: Reds and America's Industrial Unions is a 2003 book by Judith Stepan‐Norris and Maurice Zeitlin. The book challenges the prevailing ideas that American leftist unions, which largely disappeared after the 1940s, were undemocratic and uninclusive.

== Synopsis ==
Based on several years of research, and partly compiled from the authors' previously published papers on the topic, Left Out analyzes the consequences of the American labor movement's expurgation of communist organizations from its ranks in the years after World War II. The authors begin by categorizing the 39 unions that constituted the Congress of Industrial Organizations (CIO) in 1946, finding that 18 of the unions (representing more than one million workers) were communist or left-wing, and a further ten showed significant support for communism. Using quantitative techniques, Stepan‐Norris and Zeitlin show that the communist-linked unions' "internal politics were more vibrant; they defended workers' rights more strenuously; they supported gender equality more vigorously...[and] were more supportive of civil rights, both within their own ranks and as a political issue."

== Reception ==
Clifford L. Staples, of the University of North Dakota, praised the research and presentation and recommended the book for both specialists and "educated general readers".

== Authors ==
As of 2026, Judith Stepan‐Norris is a retired professor of the University of California, Irvine School of Social Sciences, and Maurice Zeitlin is a retired professor of the UCLA Department of Sociology. The pair previously collaborated on Talking Union, published in 1996.
