= Oversight of the Troubled Asset Relief Program =

The Emergency Economic Stabilization Act created the Troubled Asset Relief Program to administer up to $700 billion. Several oversight mechanisms are established by the bill, including the Congressional Oversight Panel, the Special Inspector General for TARP (SIGTARP), the Financial Stability Oversight Board, and additional requirements for the Government Accountability Office (GAO) and the Congressional Budget Office (CBO).

== Financial Stability Oversight Board (FSOB) ==
The Financial Stability Oversight Board was created to review and make recommendations regarding the Treasury's actions. Its purpose is to review the operation of TARP, to make recommendations to the Treasury for improvements, and to watch for fraud and misrepresentation. The FSOB also has the power to ensure that the Treasury follows policies in accordance with the Act and the economic interest of the U.S. It is to meet on a monthly basis and report to Congress and the Oversight Panel quarterly.

The members of the board are:

- Chairman of the Board of the Federal Reserve (currently Jerome Powell)
- Secretary of the Treasury (currently Janet Yellen)
- Director of the Federal Housing Finance Agency (currently Sandra L. Thompson, Acting)
- Chairman of the Securities and Exchange Commission (currently Gary Gensler)
- Secretary of the Department of Housing and Urban Development (currently Marcia Fudge)

== Congressional Oversight Panel (COP) ==
The Congressional Oversight Panel was mandated by Title 1, Section 125 of the TARP legislation as an "establishment in the legislative branch". The Congressional Oversight Panel was charged with the job of reviewing the state of the markets, current regulatory system, and the Treasury Department's management of the Troubled Asset Relief Program. The panel was required to report their findings to Congress every 30 days, counting from the first asset purchase made under the program. The panel was also required to submit a special report to Congress about regulatory reform on or before January 20, 2009. The Congressional Oversight Panel was initially scheduled to cease operations on December 31, 2009, though it was later renewed through early 2011.

The panel consisted of five outside experts appointed as follows:

- One member chosen by the Speaker of the House (Nancy Pelosi selected Richard H. Neiman on November 14, 2008)
- One member chosen by the minority leader of the House (John Boehner appointed Jeb Hensarling on November 19, 2008)
- One member chosen by the majority leader of the Senate (Harry Reid appointed Elizabeth Warren on November 14, 2008)
- One member chosen by the minority leader of the Senate (Mitch McConnell appointed John E. Sununu on December 17, 2008 after his original choice Judd Gregg had "stepped aside" December 1).
- One member chosen by the Speaker of the House and the majority leader of the Senate, following consultation with the minority leaders of Congress (Damon Silvers was appointed on November 14)

The first meeting of this board was held Wednesday, November 25, 2008, and elected Elizabeth Warren as the chairperson and Damon Silvers as deputy chairperson. As no assets had yet been purchased, (OFS instead chose to provide $250 billion to banks through the Capital Purchase Program) it is not clear whether the requirement to report after 30 days from "first asset purchase" has been violated.

On December 8, 2009, the government's financial bailout program concluded in a year-end review that, despite flaws and lingering problems, the program “can be credited with stopping an economic panic.” Also on this date, Rep. Jeb Hensarling stepped down from the panel, submitting his letter of resignation. Hensarling was replaced by Mark McWatters, a Dallas lawyer and certified public accountant who has served as an advisor to Hensarling.

On October 1, 2010, Senator Ted Kaufman of Delaware was appointed by Majority Leader Reid to replace Warren on the panel, as Warren resigned to focus on her duties at the Consumer Financial Protection Bureau. Three days later, Kaufman was unanimously elected as the panel's second chairperson. Kaufman was succeeded in Congress by Senator Chris Coons on November 15, 2010, but he remained chairperson of the Congressional Oversight Panel until its dissolution in 2011.

== Government Accountability Office (GAO) ==
The Comptroller General (director of the Government Accountability Office) is required to monitor the performance of the program, and report findings to Congress every 60 days. The Comptroller General is also required to audit the program annually. The bill grants the Comptroller General access to all information, records, reports, data, etc. belonging to or in use by the program.

On December 2, 2008, GAO released their first report on the bailout. Neel Kashkari, the OFS chairman, said in a letter to GAO that the department agrees with the report's findings and most of its recommendations but questioned GAO's suggestion to require more reporting from banks, saying gathering specifics from individual banks might not be the best way to evaluate the program. House Speaker Nancy Pelosi called the report's findings "discouraging" and stated that the report shows the program "is not accountable to American taxpayers."

== Special Inspector General for TARP (SIGTARP) ==
The EESA created the Office of the Special Inspector General for the Troubled Asset Relief Program (SIGTARP), and the Special Inspector General is appointed by the President and confirmed by the U.S. Senate. The Special Inspector General's purpose is to monitor, audit, and investigate TARP-related activities, including those of the Treasury in the administration of the program, and report findings to Congress every quarter. Christy Goldsmith Romero was sworn-in as the current Special Inspector General on April 9, 2012, having been nominated by President Obama on February 1, 2012, and confirmed by the U.S. Senate on March 29, 2012.

Eric Thorson is the Inspector General of the US Department of the Treasury and was originally responsible for the oversight of the TARP but expressed concerns about the difficulty of properly overseeing the complex program in addition to his regular responsibilities. Thorson called oversight of TARP a "mess" and later clarified this to say "The word 'mess' was a description of the difficulty my office would have in providing the proper level of oversight of the TARP while handling its growing workload, including conducting audits of certain failed banks and thrifts at the same time that efforts are underway to nominate a special inspector general."

Neil Barofsky was nominated on November 14, 2008 by President George W. Bush to be the Special Inspector General. He was confirmed by the Senate on December 8, 2008, and was sworn into office on December 15, 2008. Barofsky stepped down from the post on March 30, 2011. Prior to assuming the position of Special Inspector General, Barofsky was a federal prosecutor in the United States Attorney's Office for the Southern District of New York for more than eight years. Barofsky received the Attorney General's John Marshall Award for his work on the Refco matter. Barofsky also led the investigation that resulted in the indictment of the top 50 leaders of the Revolutionary Armed Forces of Colombia (FARC) on narcotics charges, a case described by the then Attorney General as the largest narcotics indictment filed in U.S. history.

Under the leadership of Barofsky, the Office of the Special Inspector General for the Troubled Asset Relief Program has quietly turned into a full-fledged financial law enforcement agency. It has 45 investigators who are empowered to carry guns and badges, and 27 vehicles with sirens and lights spread out in its branch offices across the United States. SIGTARP agents are empowered to make arrests. The agency is currently engaged in 142 ongoing criminal and civil investigations, and it has already recovered assets worth $151.8 million. By the summer of 2010, SIGTARP agents were participating in raids alongside other U.S. law enforcement agencies. They worked with FBI agents in a raid on Colonial Bank in Orlando, Florida in an investigation into possible TARP-related fraud.

In January 2012, Special Inspector General Romero said some $133 billion (~$179 billion in 2024) remained to be repaid by participants in the program, of which some at least is not likely ever to be repaid or recouped. That figure was offset partly by some $40.3 billion income and profits from repaid loans and investments; however new home-foreclosure bailout programs that could last as late as 2017 could also cost an additional $50 billion or more.

SIGTARP has been described as having a staff of 170, an annual budget of $41 million, and a substantial law-enforcement record. As of late 2013, SIGTARP had "pursued criminal charges against 107 senior bank officers, most of whom have been sentenced to prison."

== TARP oversight reports ==
=== COP reports ===
- Commercial Real Estate Losses and the Risk to Financial Stability, 02/11/10, http://cop.senate.gov/reports/library/report-021110-cop.cfm/
- Exiting TARP and Unwinding Its Impact on the Financial Markets, 01/14/10, http://cop.senate.gov/reports/library/report-011410-cop.cfm
- Taking Stock: What Has the Troubled Asset Relief Program Achieved?, 12/09/09, http://cop.senate.gov/reports/library/report-120909-cop.cfm/
- Guarantees and Contingent Payments in TARP and Related Programs, 11/06/09, http://cop.senate.gov/reports/library/report-110609-cop.cfm/
- An Assessment of Foreclosure Mitigation Efforts After Six Months, 10/09/09, http://cop.senate.gov/reports/library/report-100909-cop.cfm/
- The Use of TARP Funds in Support and Reorganization of the Domestic Automotive Industry, 09/09/09, http://cop.senate.gov/reports/library/report-090909-cop.cfm/
- The Continued Risk of Troubled Assets, 08/11/09, http://cop.senate.gov/reports/library/report-081109-cop.cfm/
- Special Report on Farm Loan Restructuring, 07/21/09, http://cop.senate.gov/reports/library/report-072109-cop.cfm/
- TARP Repayments, Including the Repurchase of Stock Warrants, 07/10/09, http://cop.senate.gov/reports/library/report-071009-cop.cfm/
- Stress Testing and Shoring Up Bank Capital, 06/09/09, http://cop.senate.gov/reports/library/report-060909-cop.cfm/
- Reviving Lending to Small Businesses and Families and the Impact of the TALF, 05/07/09, http://cop.senate.gov/reports/library/report-050709-cop.cfm/
- Assessing Treasury's Strategy: Six Months of TARP, 04/07/09, http://cop.senate.gov/reports/library/report-040709-cop.cfm/
- Foreclosure Crisis: Working Toward a Solution, 03/06/09, http://cop.senate.gov/reports/library/report-030609-cop.cfm/
- February Oversight Report: Valuing Treasury's Acquisitions, 02/06/09, http://cop.senate.gov/reports/library/report-020609-cop.cfm/
- Special Report on Regulatory Reform, 01/29/09, http://cop.senate.gov/reports/library/report-012909-cop.cfm/
- Accountability for the Troubled Asset Relief Program, 01/09/09, http://cop.senate.gov/reports/library/report-010909-cop.cfm/
- Questions About the $700 Billion Emergency Economic Stabilization Funds, 12/10/08, http://cop.senate.gov/reports/library/report-121008-cop.cfm/

Main COP Reports Website: http://cop.senate.gov/reports/

=== SIGTARP reports ===
- April 2012 Quarterly Report to Congress, 4/25/12, http://www.sigtarp.gov/Quarterly%20Reports/April_25_2012_Report_to_Congress.pdf
- Special Report: TARP & SBLF: Impact on Community Banks, 4/25/12, http://www.sigtarp.gov/Audit%20Reports/TARP_SBLF_Special_Section.pdf
- Audit Report: Factors Affecting Implementation of the Hardest Hit Fund Program, 4/12/12, http://www.sigtarp.gov/Audit%20Reports/SIGTARP_HHF_Audit.pdf
- January 2012 Quarterly Report to Congress, 1/26/12, "Report to Congress" (PDF). Archived from the original (PDF) on September 15, 2012.
- Evaluation Report: The Special Master's Determinations for Executive Compensation of Companies Receiving Exceptional Assistance under TARP, 1/24/12, http://www.sigtarp.gov/Audit%20Reports/SIGTARP_ExecComp_Audit.pdf
- October 2011 Quarterly Report to Congress, 10/27/11, http://www.sigtarp.gov/Quarterly%20Reports/October2011_Quarterly_Report_to_Congress.pdf
- Audit Report: Exiting TARP: Repayment by the Largest Financial Institutions, 9/29/11, http://www.sigtarp.gov/Audit%20Reports/Exiting_TARP_Repayments_by_the_Largest_Financial_Institutions.pdf
- Audit Report: Legal Fees Paid Under the Troubled Asset Relief Program: An Expanded Report, 9/28/11, http://www.sigtarp.gov/Audit%20Reports/G%2009%20OFS%20Contracting%20Final%2011-004%2009-28-2011.pdf
- July 2011 Quarterly Report to Congress, 7/28/11, http://www.sigtarp.gov/Quarterly%20Reports/July2011_Quarterly_Report_to_Congress.pdf
- April 2011 Quarterly Report to Congress, 4/28/11, http://www.sigtarp.gov/Quarterly%20Reports/April2011_Quarterly_Report_to_Congress.pdf
- Audit Report: Treasury's Process for Contracting for Professional Services under TARP, 4/14/11, http://www.sigtarp.gov/Audit%20Reports/Treasury's%20Process%20for%20Contracting%20for%20Professional%20Services%20under%20TARP%2004_14_11.pdf
- January 2011 Quarterly Report to Congress, 1/26/11, http://www.sigtarp.gov/Quarterly%20Reports/January2011_Quarterly_Report_to_Congress.pdf
- Audit Report: Extraordinary Financial Assistance Provided to Citigroup, Inc., 1/13/11, http://www.sigtarp.gov/Audit%20Reports/Extraordinary%20Financial%20Assistance%20Provided%20to%20Citigroup,%20Inc.pdf
- October 2010 Quarterly Report to Congress, 10/26/10, http://www.sigtarp.gov/Quarterly%20Reports/October2010_Quarterly_Report_to_Congress.pdf%5B%5D
- Audit Report: Selecting Fund Managers for the Legacy Securities Public-Private Investment Program, 10/7/10, http://www.sigtarp.gov/Audit%20Reports/Selecting%20Fund%20Managers%20for%20the%20Legacy%20Securities%20Public-Private%20Investment%20Program%2009_07_10.pdf
- July 2010 Quarterly Report to Congress, 7/21/10, http://www.sigtarp.gov/Quarterly%20Reports/July2010_Quarterly_Report_to_Congress.pdf%5B%5D
- Audit Report: Factors Affecting the Decisions of General Motors and Chrysler to Reduce Their Dealership Networks, 7/19/10, http://www.sigtarp.gov/Audit%20Reports/Factors%20Affecting%20the%20Decisions%20of%20General%20Motors%20and%20Chrysler%20to%20Reduce%20Their%20Dealership%20Networks%207_19_2010.pdf
- Audit Report: Treasury's Monitoring of Compliance with TARP Requirements by Companies Receiving Exceptional Assistance, 6/29/10, http://www.sigtarp.gov/Audit%20Reports/Treasury's%20Monitoring%20of%20Compliance%20with%20TARP%20Requirements%20by%20Companies%20Receiving%20Exceptional%20Assistance%206_29_10.pdf
- Audit Report: Assessing Treasury's Process to Sell Warrants Received from TARP Recipients, 5/11/10, http://www.sigtarp.gov/Audit%20Reports/Assessing%20Treasury's%20Process%20to%20Sell%20Warrants%20Received%20From%20TARP%20Recipients_May_11_2010.pdf
- April 2010 Quarterly Report to Congress, 4/20/10, http://www.sigtarp.gov/Quarterly%20Reports/April2010_Quarterly_Report_to_Congress.pdf
- Audit Report: Factors Affecting Implementation of the Home Affordable Modification Program, 3/25/10, http://www.sigtarp.gov/Audit%20Reports/Factors_Affecting_Implementation_of_the_Home_Affordable_Modification_Program.pdf
- January 2010 Quarterly Report to Congress, 1/30/10, http://www.sigtarp.gov/Quarterly%20Reports/January2010_Quarterly_Report_to_Congress.pdf
- Audit Report: Additional Insight on Use of Troubled Asset Relief Program Funds, 12/10/09, http://www.sigtarp.gov/Audit%20Reports/Additional_Insight_on_Use_of_Troubled_Asset_Relief_Program_Funds.pdf
- Audit Report: Factors Affecting Efforts to Limit Payments to AIG Counterparties, 11/17/09, http://www.sigtarp.gov/Audit%20Reports/Factors_Affecting_Efforts_to_Limit_Payments_to_AIG_Counterparties.pdf
- October 2009 Quarterly Report to Congress, 10/21/09, http://www.sigtarp.gov/Quarterly%20Reports/October2009_Quarterly_Report_to_Congress.pdf
- Audit Report: Extent of Federal Agencies’ Oversight of AIG Compensation Varied, and Important Challenges Remain, 10/14/09, http://www.sigtarp.gov/Audit%20Reports/Extent_of_Federal_Agencies'_Oversight_of_AIG_Compensation_Varied_and_Important_Challenges_Remain_10_14_09.pdf
- Audit Report: Emergency Capital Injections Provided to Support the Viability of Bank of America, Other Major Banks, and the U.S. Financial System, 10/5/09, http://www.sigtarp.gov/Audit%20Reports/Emergency_Capital_Injections_Provided_to_Support_the_Viability_of_Bank_of_America.pdf
- Audit Report: Despite Evolving Rules on Executive Compensation, SIGTARP Survey Provides Insight on Compliance, 8/19/09, http://www.sigtarp.gov/Audit%20Reports/Sigtarp%20Survey.pdf
- Audit Report: Opportunities to Strengthen Controls to Avoid Undue External Influence over Capital Purchase Program Decision Making, 8/6/09, http://www.sigtarp.gov/Audit%20Reports/Opportunities_to_Strengthen_Controls.pdf%5B%5D
- July 2009 Quarterly Report to Congress, 7/21/09, http://www.sigtarp.gov/Quarterly%20Reports/July2009_Quarterly_Report_to_Congress.pdf
- Audit Report: SIGTARP Survey Demonstrates that Banks Can Provide Meaningful Information on Their Use of TARP Funds, 7/20/09, http://www.sigtarp.gov/Audit%20Reports/SIGTARP_Survey_Demonstrates_That_Banks_Can_Provide_Meaningfu_%20Information_On_Their_Use_Of_TARP_Funds.pdf
- April 2009 Quarterly Report to Congress, 4/21/09, http://www.sigtarp.gov/Quarterly%20Reports/April2009_Quarterly_Report_to_Congress.pdf
- February 2009 Quarterly Report to Congress, 2/6/09, http://www.sigtarp.gov/Quarterly%20Reports/SIGTARP_Initial_Report_to_the_Congress.pdf

Main SIGTARP ‘Reports & Audits’ Page: https://web.archive.org/web/20120529062723/http://www.sigtarp.gov/pages/reportsaudits.aspx

=== GAO reports ===
- TARP: Treasury Needs to Strengthen Its Decision-Making Process on the Term Asset-Backed Securities Loan Facility, 02/05/10
- TARP: The U.S. Government Role as Shareholder in AIG, Citigroup, Chrysler, and General Motors and Preliminary Views on its Investment Management Activities, 12/16/09
- AUDIT: Office of Financial Stability (TARP) Fiscal Year 2009 Financial Statements, 12/09/09
- TARP: Continued Stewardship Needed as Treasury Develops Strategies for Monitoring and Divesting Financial Interests in Chrysler and GM, 11/02/09
- TARP: One Year Later, Actions Are Needed to Address Remaining Transparency and Accountability Challenges, 10/08/09
- TARP: Status of Government Assistance Provided to AIG, 09/21/09, http://www.gao.gov/products/GAO-09-975/
- TARP: Treasury Actions Needed to Make the Home Affordable Modification Program More Transparent and Accountable, 07/23/09
- TARP: June 2009 Status of Efforts to Address Transparency and Accountability Issues, 06/17/09
- TARP: March 2009 Status of Efforts to Address Transparency and Accountability Issues, 03/31/09
- TARP: Status of Efforts to Address Transparency and Accountability Issues, 01/30/09
- TARP: Additional Actions Needed to Better Ensure Integrity, Accountability, and Transparency, 12/02/08

Main GAO reports website: http://www.gao.gov/docsearch/featured/financialmarketsandhousing.html

=== Treasury Department and Financial Stability Oversight Board (FSOB) ===
- Financial Stability Plan, One Year Later, 02/10/10
- TARP Exit Strategy, Sec. Geithner letter to Congress, 12/09/09
- TARP Monthly Report - December 2009, 01/11/10
- TARP and Office of Financial Stability Agency Financial Statement for FY2009, 12/10/09
- TARP Warrant Disposition Report, 01/20/10
- Making Home Affordable Monthly Report - December 2009, 01/19/10
- Small Business Financing Forum, 11/18/09
- FSOB Quarter Ending 31 December 2009
- FSOB Quarter Ending 30 September 2009
- FSOB Quarter Ending 30 June 2009
- FSOB Quarter Ending 31 March 2009
- FSOB Quarter Ending 31 December 2008

Main TARP reports and transactions: http://www.financialstability.gov/latest/reportsanddocs.html

=== CBO reports ===
- The Troubled Asset Relief Program: Report on Transactions Through June 17, 2009
- The Troubled Asset Relief Program: Report on Transactions Through December 31, 2008

Additional CBO reports citing TARP: http://www.cbo.gov/search/sitesearch.cfm?criteria=TARP

== Additional resources on TARP oversight ==
- House Financial Services Committee's TARP oversight reports page
- ProPublica's "Eye on the Bailout"
- Bailout Sleuth blog
- Huffington Post's Bailout page
- Google News' search of TARP and Bailouts
- New York Times' TARP page
- Wall Street Journal's TARP page

== Claims that oversight has not been effective ==
=== Government officials overseeing bailout don't know how it's being spent ===
A December 31, 2008, Associated Press article stated, "Government officials overseeing a $700 billion bailout have acknowledged difficulties tracking the money and assessing the program's effectiveness."

A January 29, 2009 article from Bloomberg stated, "Bloomberg News asked the Treasury Department Jan. 26 to disclose what securities it backed over the past two months in a second round of actions to prop up Bank of America Corp. and Citigroup Inc. Department spokeswoman Stephanie Cutter said Jan. 27 she would seek an answer. None had been provided by the close of business yesterday."

=== Banks won't say how they are spending bailout money ===
A December 22, 2008 Associated Press article stated, "The Associated Press contacted 21 banks that received at least $1 billion in government money and asked four questions: How much has been spent? What was it spent on? How much is being held in savings, and what's the plan for the rest? None of the banks provided specific answers... Some banks said they simply didn't know where the money was going."

A review of investor presentations and conference calls by executives of some two dozen US-based banks by the New York Times found that "few [banks] cited lending as a priority. An overwhelming majority saw the bailout program as a no-strings-attached windfall that could be used to pay down debt, acquire other businesses or invest for the future."

=== Federal government paid $254 billion for assets that were worth only $176 billion ===
On February 5, 2009, Elizabeth Warren, chairperson of the Congressional Oversight Panel, told the Senate Banking Committee that during 2008, the federal government paid $254 billion for assets that were worth only $176 billion.

=== Bailout recipients spent $114 million on lobbying and campaign contributions in 2008 ===
On February 4, 2009, it was reported that during 2008, the companies that received bailout money had spent $114 million on lobbying and campaign contributions. These companies received $295 billion in bailout money. Sheila Krumholz, executive director of OpenSecrets, said of this information, "Even in the best economic times, you won't find an investment with a greater payoff than what these companies have been getting."

=== Bank of America throws $10 million Super Bowl party ===
A February 2, 2009, ABC News article titled, "Bailed Out Bank of America Sponsors Super Bowl Fun Fest" stated that Bank of America sponsored a Super Bowl event at a five-star resort in Palm Beach, which was described as "... a five day carnival-like affair... 850,000 square feet of sports games and interactive entertainment attractions for football fans..." Although the bank refused to answer ABC News' questions about the cost of the event, a confidential source told ABC that the cost was approximately $10 million (~$14.2 million in 2024).

== Oversight efforts ==
=== XBRL proposed as tool to aid in TARP oversight ===
At the Domestic Policy Subcommittee hearing of the Oversight and Government Reform Committee on March 11, 2009, XBRL was proposed as a mechanism for automating the data entry and processing of financial filings to aid in TARP oversight.
