= Will Lehman =

American autoworker and socialist

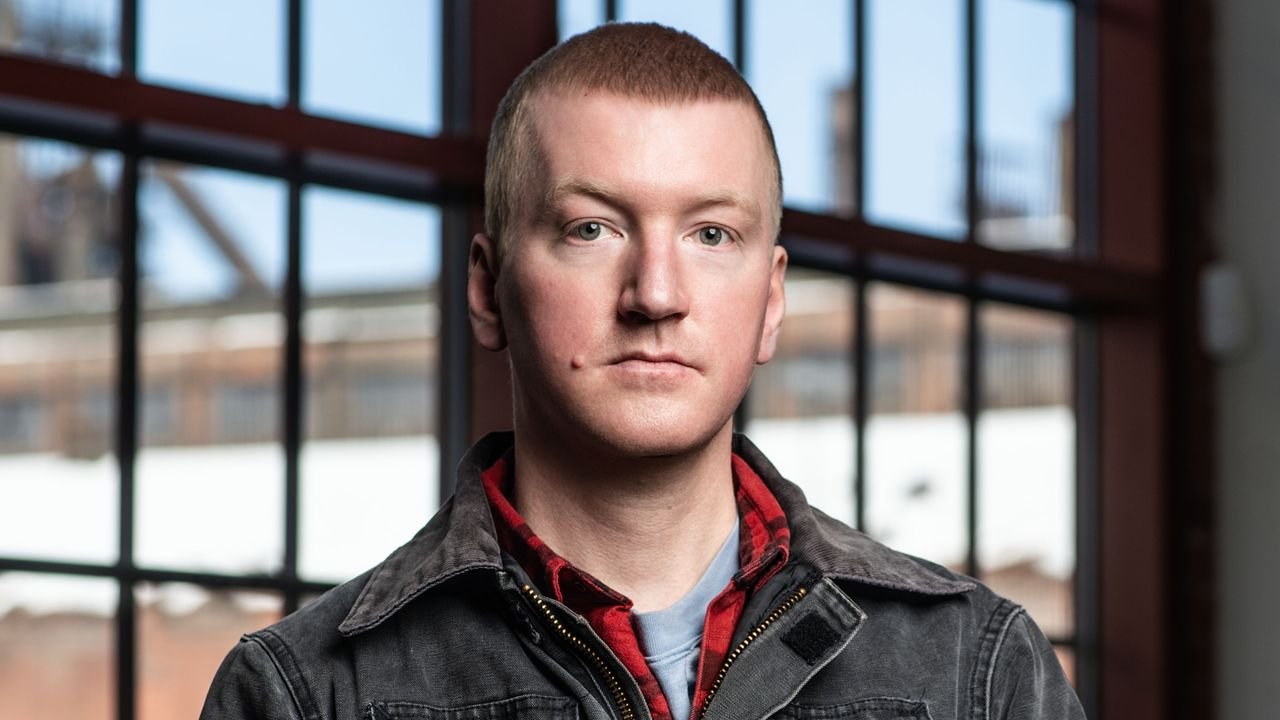
- Occupations: Autoworker; trade union activist
- Known for: Candidate for President of the United Auto Workers (2022–2023, 2026); election-related litigation
- Website: https://www.willforuawpresident.org/

Will Lehman is an American autoworker and a socialist, trade union activist. He ran for president of the United Auto Workers (UAW) in the union's first direct election of international officers in 2022–2023. Lehman filed federal lawsuits challenging aspects of the election process and the U.S. Department of Labor's handling of his election complaint. In February 2026, Lehman announced that he was again running for president of the United Auto Workers in the union's 2026 elections in order to "transfer power and decision making from the pro-corporate union apparatus to workers on the shop floor.” In June 2026, Lehman was officially nominated as a candidate for president for the 2026 union elections at the 39th UAW Constitutional Convention. He received endorsements from two delegates, the maximum number allowed, from UAW Locals 1821 and 2145.

== Employment ==
Lehman works as a materials technician at Mack Trucks’ Lehigh Valley facility in Macungie, Pennsylvania.

== 2022-23 UAW presidential campaign ==
At the UAW's 38th Constitutional Convention in July 2022, delegates nominated Lehman for UAW international president as part of the union's transition to direct elections for top offices. Media coverage described him as a challenger emphasizing greater rank-and-file control within the union, and a socialist opposing collaboration with the auto companies.

He was one of five candidates for president in the 2022–23 United Auto Workers international union election. In the first round of voting, Lehman received nearly 5,000 votes; he did not advance to the runoff election between Shawn Fain and Ray Curry.

== 2026 UAW presidential campaign ==
After being nominated by the maximum number of delegates allowed at the UAW's 39th Constitutional Convention in June 2026, Lehman was again approved as a candidate for UAW international president. On July 16, 2026 Lehman received on his public Facebook page a threatening AI-generated image from Raymond Jensen Jr. who was employed as a staffer for the UAW International's Department of Organizing and Bargaining Strategies. Previously he had served as a UAW Region 9 assistant director, the same region Lehman is employed in. The image depicted Lehman bound and gagged by rope, bloodied, and with a masked man in the background aiming an assault rifle at his head. In a letter addressed to the counsel for the court-appointed monitor overseeing the UAW Lehman's attorney, Eric Lee, demanded the immediate suspension without pay of Jensen Jr. pending an investigation into the post as well as any possible knowledge that the Shawn Fain campaign had of the post given Jensen Jr.'s position inside the UAW and public identification as supporting Fain's re-election.

On August 5, 2026 the court appointed monitor overseeing the UAW, Neil Barofsky, ruled that Raymond Jensen Jr.’s post violated Rule 4-4 of the election rules which prohibits threats and intimidation. The monitor ruled that Jensen Jr. is to be suspended from the UAW for two years, barred from campaigning for any candidate during the 2026 UAW election cycle, permanentely banned from running for any elected position within the UAW, and required to apologize to Lehman.

On October 6, 2026 Lehman released a statement saying that he had heard from his attorney that Jensen Jr.'s position inside the union's Department of Organizing and Bargaining Strategies had been terminated. Despite the above-mentioned sanctions the UAW's monitor left their employment with the union up to them, as being a member in good standing was not a prerequisite for the position he held. Lehman said in part to the news, "This only happened because UAW members and workers throughout the world denounced this thuggery and demanded Jensen’s removal."

Accordig to figures published by the monitor, Will Lehman finished 6th out of 6 candidates for president and received 1,967 votes, or 1.99%, which were both decreases from his first round performance in the 2022-2023 elections. Supporters noted that turnout in 2026 was even lower than the first round in 2022, 98,666 versus 103,495 for president, and claimed this demonstrated that the central issue in Lehman's campaign, that rank and file workers are disconnected from the union's bureaucracy and democratic processes, was correct as well as explaining the fall in his share of the vote. They also noted that according to the UAW's own statements, more UAW members voted in Michigan's 2026 Democratic Party primaries than voted nationwide in the UAW's own election.

== Election-related litigation and complaints ==
In November 2022, Lehman filed a federal lawsuit seeking to extend the ballot deadline in the UAW international officers’ election, alleging that members had not been properly notified and that ballot distribution was inadequate.

In March 2023, Lehman submitted an election complaint to the U.S. Department of Labor's Office of Labor-Management Standards (OLMS). In August 2023, OLMS issued a Statement of Reasons declining to seek a rerun of the election.

In July 2023, Lehman sued the U.S. Department of Labor over its handling of his complaint. In June 2024, the U.S. District Court for the Eastern District of Michigan ruled in Lehman's favor in a "rare example of the courts rebuking" the Department of Labor's oversight of unions. Lehman filed another complaint against the Department of Labor in 2025 in the U.S. District Court for the District of New Jersey.

Court-appointed monitorship reports connected to the federal consent decree overseeing UAW reforms have discussed election administration issues and referenced Lehman's litigation and complaints in that context.

== Labor disputes and commentary ==
During a 2023 strike by Mack Trucks workers following rejection of a tentative agreement, Reuters quoted Lehman criticizing the proposed deal and connecting the dispute to broader labor conflicts in the auto industry. Lehman has also published opinion pieces on labor and economic issues, including in Newsweek, arguing against economic nationalism and for class struggle.

== See also ==
- 2022–23 United Auto Workers international union election
