= William Lehman =

William Lehman or William Lehmann may refer to:

- William Lehman (Florida politician) (1913–2005), Florida congressman
- William Eckart Lehman (1821–1895), Pennsylvania congressman
- William Lehman (soccer) (1901–1979), American soccer player
- William E. Lehman (architect) (1874–1951), architect based in New Jersey
- Coyote McCloud (born William Lehmann; 1942–2011), radio disc jockey in Nashville, Tennessee
- Will Lehman, American trade unionist
- Seigfried Stanke (born William J. Lehman; 1938–2012), American professional wrestler

== See also ==
- Wilhelm Lehmann (disambiguation)
- Frederick William Lehmann (1853–1931), American lawyer and politician
- William Burdett-Coutts (born William Lehman Ashmead-Bartlett; 1851–1921), British Conservative politician
- Florida State Road 856, also known as the William Lehman Causeway
