= Neil Barofsky =

American lawyer (born 1970)

Special Inspector General of the Troubled Asset Relief Program
- In office December 8, 2008 – April 1, 2011
- President: George W. Bush; Barack Obama
- Preceded by: Position established
- Succeeded by: Christy Romero

Personal details
- Born: 1970 (age 55–56)
- Education: University of Pennsylvania (BS); New York University (JD)

Neil M. Barofsky (born 1970), a partner in the Litigation Department of national law firm Jenner & Block LLP, focuses his practice on white collar investigations, complex commercial litigation, monitorships and examinerships.

Immediately before joining Jenner & Block, Mr. Barofsky was Senior Fellow at New York University School of Law’s Center on the Administration of Criminal Law, an adjunct professor at the law school, and affiliated with the Mitchell Jacobson Leadership Program on Law and Business. He was the Treasury Department's Special Inspector General (SIGTARP) overseeing the Troubled Assets Relief Program, from December 15, 2008, until his resignation on March 30, 2011. Before that, he was an Assistant United States Attorney for the Southern District of New York from 2000 to 2008.

Since May 2021, Barofsky has served as the court-appointed monitor of United Auto Workers.

== Education ==
Barofsky went to Spanish River High School in Boca Raton, Florida, and completed his undergraduate studies at the University of Pennsylvania, earning a bachelor's degree in economics from Wharton School of Business.

He graduated with honors from New York University School of Law in 1995.

== Career ==
=== US Attorney's Office ===
Barofsky joined the U.S Attorney’s office for the Southern District of New York in 2000 as a prosecutor. As Assistant U.S. Attorney, Barofsky prosecuted 50 leaders of the Colombian guerilla group FARC on narcotics charges. He led the office’s mortgage fraud group that investigated retail mortgage fraud and securities fraud. In 2008, Barofsky successfully prosecuted a $2.4 billion accounting fraud case against the commodities broker Refco, which at the time was one of the largest accounting fraud cases in history.

=== Troubled Asset Relief Program and Special Inspector Generalship ===
Barofsky was nominated for the job of overseeing the TARP by President George W. Bush on November 14, 2008 and was confirmed by the United States Senate on December 8, 2008, after confirmation was delayed by Senator Jim Bunning.

Until he was confirmed, the role was handled internally by the Treasury Department's inspector general, Eric Thorson, who had expressed concerns about the difficulty of properly overseeing the complex program in addition to his regular responsibilities.

As Inspector General, Barofsky, "[a] life-long Democrat who donated money to the Obama campaign," was viewed as "one of the most impressive and courageous political officials in Washington" for his willingness to "stand up to some of the most powerful people and institutions in Washington or on Wall Street." He "vigilantly fought for his independence as TARP watchdog and has been relentless in his criticism of Treasury officials and especially Tim Geithner." The TARP program money was used to invest in, and in some cases rescue, a number of banks, the automakers GM and Chrysler, the insurance company AIG as well as a number of real estate companies. The role of the chief watchdog of the government's $700 billion TARP program was to root out and prosecute waste, fraud and abuse. Under Barofsky, the office published 9 quarterly results and 13 audits.

On February 14, 2011, Barofsky sent a letter to President Obama stating that he would resign his post on March 30, 2011, to spend more time with his family. At the time of his resignation, his office had more than 140 investigations underway. By then, his office charged a few dozen people with civil or criminal fraud, resulting in 14 convictions, more than $550 million in fraud losses avoided, and $150 million in fraudulent earnings recovered for taxpayers.

"[O]ne Treasury official, who spoke on condition of anonymity, was quoted as saying "[H]e's been consistently wrong about a lot of big things". Commentator Glenn Greenwald noted the unnamed official had made the assertion about Barofsky "without identifying a single alleged error," and attacked the "utter cowardice and lack of professionalism needed to produce this passage" on the part of both the newspaper and the official.

=== Jenner & Block ===
In 2013, Barofsky joined the law firm Jenner & Block as a partner and became head of the firm’s monitorship practice. Beginning in 2014, while an attorney with Jenner & Block, Barofsky served as the independent corporate monitor for Credit Suisse after the bank pleaded guilty to assisting American clients with tax evasion. In 2017, Barofsky was appointed monitor as part of a settlement with the Department of Justice regarding Credit Suisse’s alleged abuses of Residential Mortgage Backed Securities. In 2021, Barofsky was hired by Credit Suisse as an independent overseer of an inquiry commissioned by Credit Suisse to investigate the scope of its historical assistance to Nazis. Credit Suisse dismissed Barofsky from the position in 2022. It was subsequently revealed in a report subpoenaed by the Senate Budget Committee that Barofsky was skeptical about the thoroughness of Credit Suisse in investigating the scope of the assistance they provided to Nazis. In 2023, Barofsky was reinstated to the position following the Senate panel’s probe into Credit Suisse’s handling of the investigation. In 2023, the Department of Housing and Urban Development named Jenner & Block to oversee the New York City Housing Authority (NYCHA) and Barofsky was appointed as federal co-monitor.

==== UAW Monitor ====
In May 2021, Barofsky was appointed by the United States District Court for the Eastern District of Michigan as an independent monitor of the United Auto Workers (UAW) labor union, following a consent decree entered into by the UAW with the US Department of Justice following a corruption investigation.

On February 15, 2024, Barofsky sent a letter to the UAW International Executive Board (IEB), forwarding a complaint from the Anti-Defamation League about the UAW's demand for a ceasefire in the Gaza war, with Barofsky noting, "Although this issue is outside of the Monitor’s jurisdiction, we thought it was important to forward the message to the IEB given the serious concerns raised here." Barofsky also noted in the letter that he had made an earlier call to UAW President Shawn Fain raising similar issues, adding, "For what it’s worth, as I previously shared with Shawn, similar concerns were raised directly to me shortly after the IEB issued its own ceasefire statement." New York State’s first-in-the-nation anti-BDS law requires state and local governments to divest from any group engaged in BDS calls. With the UAW representing public and graduate employees at public universities, the state could be forced to divest from the UAW’s pension and retirement funds, or possibly even not provide dues check-off for the union. New York State law has allowed the state to strip unions of dues check-off if they violate state law. Having been sent a serious legal threat, Barofsky informed UAW President Shawn Fain of the threat in December and forwarded the letter from the ADL to the International Executive Board (IEB).

On February 23, UAW lawyer Benjamin Dictor wrote a letter to Barofsky criticizing Barofsky's use of his position as UAW Monitor to pressure the union over its ceasefire stance, writing, "Your call to President Fain on an issue so blatantly outside of the Monitor’s jurisdiction was inappropriate as your Office holds disproportionate power over the UAW, and even a 'strictly personal' sharing of opinion implicitly implicates such power dynamic."

On February 29, 2024, Barofsky wrote to the UAW, informing them that he was opening an investigation into Fain over a dispute between Fain and the secretary-treasurer of the UAW, Margaret Mock, who claimed to have been improperly stripped of her duties by the IEB in February 2024. A report that Barofsky submitted to a federal court in June 2024 revealed that Barofsky was also investigating Fain over a dispute between Fain and UAW vice president Rich Boyer, who claimed to have been improperly stripped of his duties by Fain in May 2024.

In July 2026 Barofsky received a complaint from Will Lehman, a candidate for President in the 2026 UAW Elections, for an AI-generated image posted on his Facebook page depicting him in distress and targeted by a gunman. The poster, Raymond Jensen Jr., was a member of the UAW International's Department of Organizing and Bargaining Strategies and previously the assistant regional director of UAW Region 9. On August 5, 2026 Barofsky found that Jensen Jr. violated Rule 4-4 of the election rules which prohibits threats and intimidation. Barofsky suspended Jensen Jr. from the UAW for two years, barred him from campaigning for any candidate during the 2026 UAW election cycle, permanently banned him from holding any elected position within the UAW, and required an apology to Lehman.

== Other activities ==
In 2011, Barofsky joined the faculty of New York University’s law school as a senior fellow.

== Books ==
- Bailout: An Inside Account of How Washington Abandoned Main Street While Rescuing Wall Street (2012). ISBN 9781451684933.
