= Owatonna Senior High School =

Owatonna High School

Location
- 1455 SE 18th St, Owatonna, MN 55060; Owatonna, Minnesota 55060; United States; 44°3′49.604″N 93°11′53.662″W

Information
- School type: Public secondary school
- Established: 1879
- School district: Independent School District 761
- Superintendent: Jeff Elstad
- Principal: Kory Kath
- Teaching staff: 84.47 (FTE)
- Grades: 9-12
- Enrollment: 1,494 (2023-2024)
- Student to teacher ratio: 17.69
- Colors: Royal blue and silver
- Slogan: Keep your eyes on the prize
- Athletics conference: Big 9 Conference
- Nickname: Huskies
- Newspaper: Magnet
- Yearbook: Glyph
- Communities served: Owatonna, Owatonna Township
- Website: ohs.isd761.org
- Owatonna High School
- Formerly listed on the U.S. National Register of Historic Places
- Built: 1920
- Architects: Jacobson and Jacobson
- Architectural style: Classical Revival
- NRHP reference No.: 86002124

Significant dates
- Added to NRHP: July 31, 1986
- Removed from NRHP: August 2, 2000

Owatonna High School (OHS) is a public school in Owatonna, Minnesota, United States. The school was established in 1877. Construction of the current building started in 2021 and finished in 2023 and opened for students fall 2023. It currently has an average of 1600 students and 203 faculty members.

== History ==
=== First OHS ===
The First Owatonna High School was a wooden structure built in 1868 on Main St. across the street from what became Pillsbury Baptist Bible College, which was known as Pillsbury Academy at the time. The first class graduated in 1877 with four boys and three girls. A fire destroyed the building in 1882. No photograph of the building is known to exist.

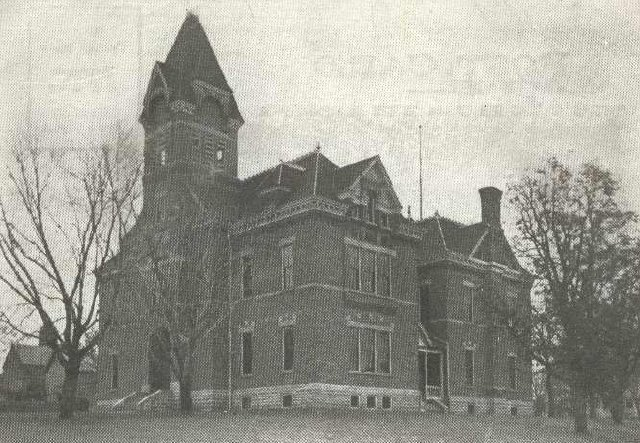
Second Owatonna High School 1885

=== Second OHS ===
After the loss of the first high school, a larger, brick structure was built in 1883 at the same location as the original, for the cost of $90,000. in 1920 the school newspaper, the Magnet, wrote an article about the building being unsafe and outdated. Accounts of extreme crowding and unsafe conditions were reported by staff and students.

On Thursday April 1, 1920, a referendum was held to obtain $250,000 for the construction of new high school building. The referendum passed and a location was chosen on Grove Ave and School Street. Construction started later that year. In the beginning of the 1920 - 1921 school year, the Magnet wrote an article about the freshmen class being the largest in the history of the OHS along information, and construction updates about the new building. On December 16, 1920, a fire broke out in the bell tower of the school. The fire was extinguished and only minimal damage was caused.

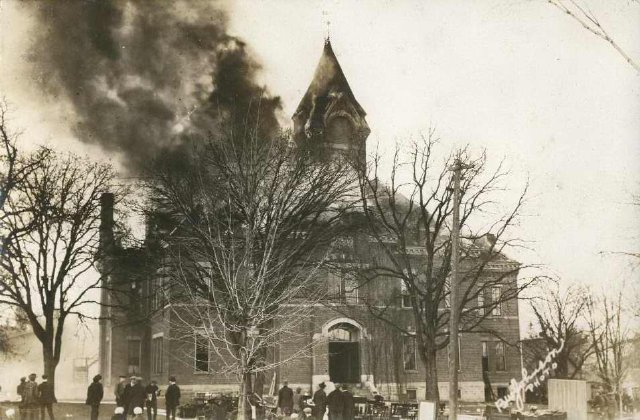
OHS fire April 29, 1921

Later that school year on April 19, 1921, another fire sparked in the attic of the building and spread, eventually engulfing the roof and second floor. The fire caused severe damage to the building, and the school was closed permanently. Insurance covered $30,000 for the building and $5,000 for its contents. The remains were demolished sometime after. The site remained empty until 1951 when Washington Elementary School (now Owatonna Education Center) was built.

Completed OHS 1921

=== Third OHS ===
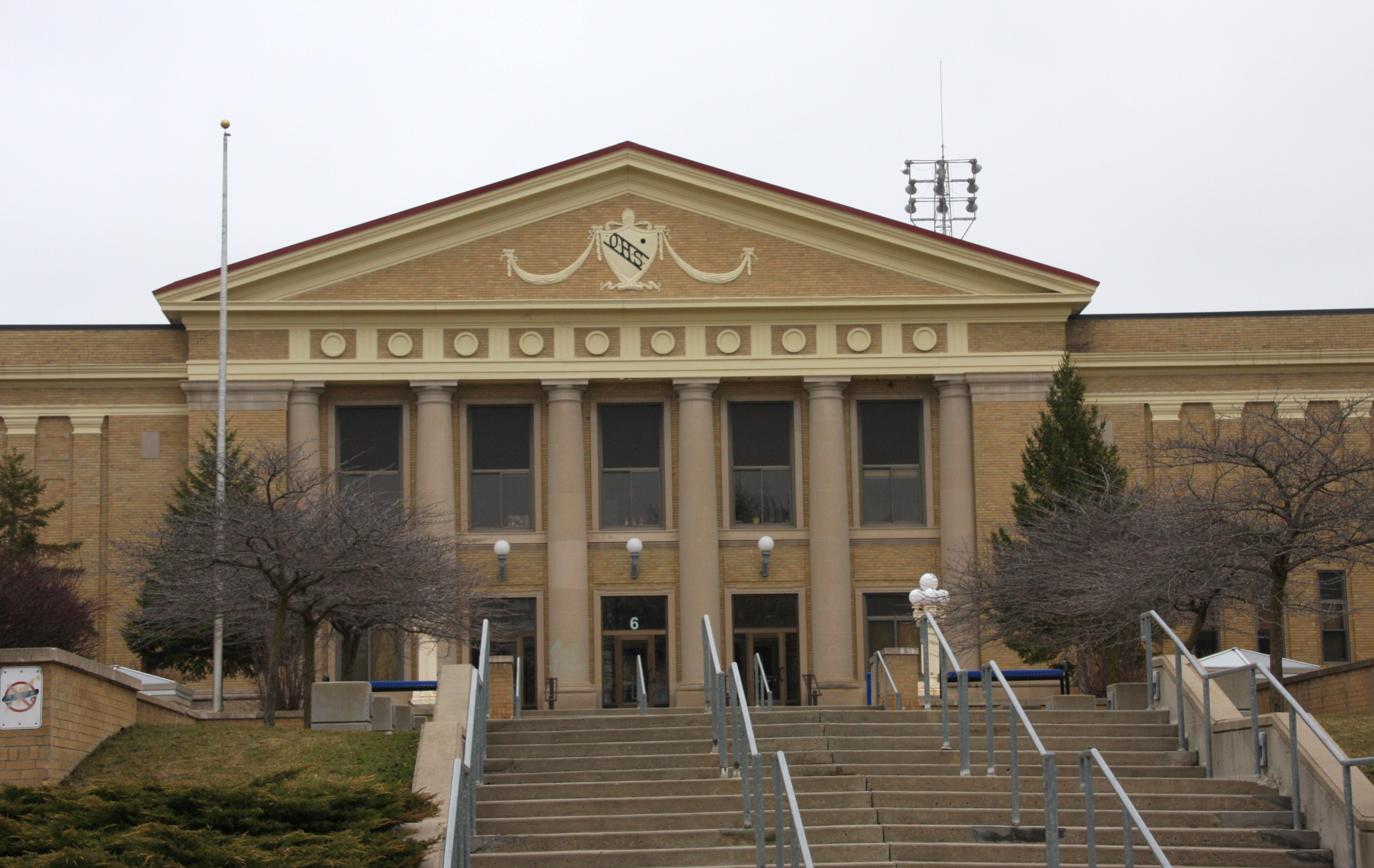
Classical revival main entrance in 2017

The cornerstone was laid on September 3, 1920, for this 85,000 square feet floor space. The local architects were Jacobson and Jacobson, who were OHS graduates. The original cost of the building was $575,657. The high school opened September 14, 1921, with sixty seniors, sixteen normal school students, and ten post-graduate students. The first class graduated in 1922. There have been four additions over the years: in 1954, 1955, 1957, and 1996, and a separate auto-mechanics building which was added in 1978.

The OHS has had multiple renovations and changes after the additions in the 1950s. The original location of the gymnasium was located behind the auditorium, and was sectioned off, creating what is now the band and orchestra rooms. The original lunchroom was located under the north wing of the original 1921 section of the building, which is now used for storage of janitorial equipment and school records.

Under the auditorium lobby lies the old Auditorium Fan Room which holds two, large and old fans that were used to circulate air through the auditorium before the installation of modern air conditioners. The area is now used as miscellaneous storage. In the south wing of the 1921 section of the school down in the basement was where the original woods and metal shops were located.

Currently they are used as equipment and tool storage for school custodial maintenance staff. The basement area underneath the auditorium stage and original gym, contain the original locker rooms and the old pool. After the pool was closed at un unconfirmed date, the theatre department began using the space for storage, up until 2018 when black mold was discovered and the room was condemned. The original library was located on the second floor above the main doors and was converted into a classroom after the band and orchestra moved to their current rooms behind the auditorium in the late 1980s. The auditorium has received many changes by itself with the removal of windows, stage extension, technicians booth extension, seating replacement, the removal of the original catwalk system, and replacing it with a counter weight fly system, light replacement, stage replacement, and curtain replacement.

This high school building was listed on the National Register of Historic Places in 1986 for its architectural significance. However the alterations in the late 1990s compromised the school's historic appearance, and it was removed from the National Register in 2000.

In 1995, the film Angus (1995), whose cast included Ariana Richards and James Van Der Beek, was filmed on location in Owatonna, mostly at OHS.

Much of the 2014 silent film The Root of Evil was shot on location at the school, most notably outside the main entrance and in the basement of the building. Produced by a cast and crew of over sixty Owatonna High School students, the film has received ten awards at over eight film festivals on the international circuit. Memorabilia from the film is set to be on display in the high school museum.

On June 4, 2014, at 12:30 p.m. a small fire broke out in the school's auditorium above the stage, when a light came in contact with a curtain. The fire was contained to the right side of the stage, lasting a short amount of time, the fire was extinguished by the school's sprinkler system. When fire crews arrived, the fire was almost completely extinguished. Once the fire was contained, fire crews and janitorial staff began to ventilate the smoke out of the auditorium and school. Students were released at 1:30 pm and were not allowed back in the building until 7:50 the next morning. A state fire marshal lead the investigation with help from the theatre department director and school staff. The fire was determined as human error, and no one was held accountable. Repairs and minor renovations for smoke and water damage, in the auditorium, took place over that summer and were finished shortly after the next school year began.

After passing a 2019 bond referendum, a citizens task force was established to plan the redevelopment of the OHS site. on April 25, 2022, The Task Force recommended to the Owatonna Public Schools School Board that The District own and operate the C Plaza, Gymnasium/Locker Room spaces, and VoAg building, to consolidate district facilities, such as the district office, located on West Bridge Street and the district maintenance shop on East Rose Street. The task force also recommended entry into a development agreement with Paul Warshauer of Grande Venues / FOHS LLC to explore potential redevelopment of the remainder of the building/complex. On March 16, 2023, Former OHS, LLC (FOHS) presented their proposal to the task force On April 10, 2023, the task force made their recommendation to the School Board. The recommendation stated:

"The Task Force is recommending to the School Board to cease negotiations with FOHS and proceed with the District’s project on their own timeline. The project should demolish the portions of the building that will not be used by the District and retain the green space. The Task Force suggests the School Board evaluate any future uses of the property with the Task Force’s criteria outlined in previous recommendations on how to use the property to best serve the School District and the Community."

On April 24, 2023, the school board unanimously approved the task force's recommendation. A three part auction was held in September 2023, allowing the public to purchase equipment, furniture, and other items that were not used in the new building. In October 2023, asbestos abatement began at the former OHS. The portion of the building being retained by the school district was separated from the portions slated for demolition in November 2023. Demolition of the 1957 "G-wing" addition began in December 2023. Renovations in the retained portion will start January 2024 and be completed and open late July 2024 according to the district′s plan.

=== Fourth OHS ===
Main entrance of current Owatonna High School.

In November 2019, voters approved a $104 million bond referendum to build a new high school in the southeast corner of town. Multiple businesses pledged financial support. Local business, Federated Insurance donated $20 million towards the cost of the new high school and to reduce the tax impact to the community. Wenger Corporation and Viracon also pledged resources of music equipment and glass respectively to help support the project. The building broke ground on May 6, 2021.

The first day of school in the new building for freshmen and sophomores was on September 6, 2023 and on September 5 for juniors and seniors. A public ribbon cutting ceremony was held on September 23, 2023.

== Athletics ==
Owatonna Senior High School is a member of the Minnesota State High School League and the Big Nine conference. The school also has a hall of fame with members inducted and honored annually.

- Adapted floor hockey
- Baseball
- Basketball
- Cheerleading
- Cross country
- Football
- Golf
- Gymnastics
- Hockey
- Lacrosse
- Soccer
- Softball
- Swimming
- Diving
- Tennis
- Track and field
- Volleyball
- Wrestling
- Bowling
- Dance team

== Notable alumni ==
- Ken Christianson, American composer, artist and musician
- Masanori Mark Christianson, art director and musician
- Noel Jenke, NFL football player, All American college football player
- Kory Kath, former Minnesota state representative, current principal
- Sheila Krumholz, former director of OpenSecrets
- Craig Minowa, lead singer of Cloud Cult and founder of record label Earthology Records
- Travis Wiuff, American mixed martial artist
- Adam Young, musician and founder of Owl City
- John Malcolm Smith, World War II naval aviator and double Ace

== Notable faculty ==
- Ima Winchell Stacy (1867-1923), educator
