= Ted Kaufman =

American politician and businessman (born 1939)

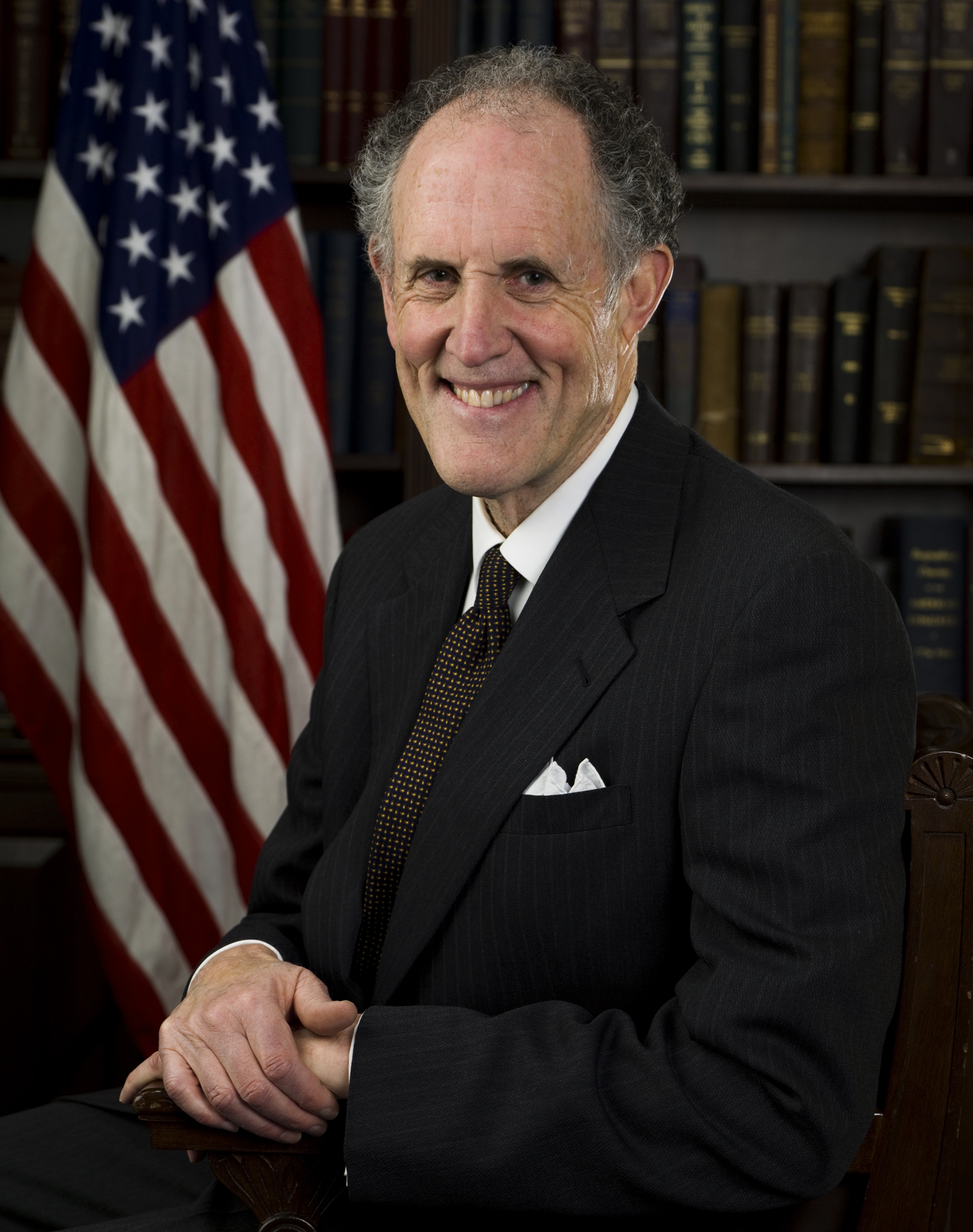
- Official portrait, 2009

Chair of the Congressional Oversight Panel
- In office October 6, 2010 – April 3, 2011
- Deputy: Damon Silvers
- Preceded by: Elizabeth Warren
- Succeeded by: Position abolished

United States Senator from Delaware
- In office January 15, 2009 – November 15, 2010
- Appointed by: Ruth Ann Minner
- Preceded by: Joe Biden
- Succeeded by: Chris Coons

Personal details
- Born: Edward Emmett Kaufman; March 15, 1939 (age 87) Philadelphia, Pennsylvania, U.S.
- Party: Democratic
- Spouse: Lynne Kaufman (m. 1960)
- Children: 3
- Education: Duke University (BS); University of Pennsylvania (MBA)
- Kaufman's voice Kaufman opening a Congressional Oversight Panel hearing on the effects of the Troubled Asset Relief Program. Recorded December 16, 2010

Edward Emmett Kaufman (born March 15, 1939) is a retired American politician and businessman who served as a United States senator from Delaware from 2009 to 2010. He chaired the Congressional Oversight Panel for the Oversight of the Troubled Asset Relief Program; he was the second and final person to hold the position, succeeding Elizabeth Warren. Kaufman is a member of the Democratic Party and a key ally of former president Joe Biden.

Kaufman was appointed to the Senate to serve the remainder of longtime senator Biden's term after he was elected vice president in 2008. Before becoming a U.S. senator, Kaufman had served as an advisor to Biden for much of his political career and later served as the head of his presidential transition. On a personal level, Kaufman has been described as Biden's "best friend".

== Early life, education and business career ==
Edward Emmett Kaufman was born on March 15, 1939, in Philadelphia, the son of Helen (née Carroll), a teacher, and Manuel Kaufman, a social worker. His father was of Russian Jewish ancestry, and his mother was a Catholic of Irish descent. He was raised Catholic, his mother's religion. Kaufman graduated Central High School in Philadelphia, earned a Bachelor of Science degree in mechanical engineering from Duke University, and a Master of Business Administration degree from the Wharton School of the University of Pennsylvania.

Kaufman originally moved to Delaware in 1966 to work for DuPont as an engineer.

== Work for Joe Biden ==
In 1972, he joined Joe Biden's U.S. Senate campaign, which was considered a long shot, on a volunteer basis. After Biden's surprise victory in 1972, he took a one-year leave of absence from DuPont to organize and head Senator Biden's Delaware office. In 1976 he became Biden's chief of staff and administrative assistant and served until 1995, also working on Biden's subsequent Senate campaigns. After Biden's victory in the 2020 presidential election, Kaufman was chosen to head Biden's transition team.

Before serving as a U.S. senator, Kaufman was a member of the Broadcasting Board of Governors from August 11, 1995 to December 1, 2008 and was succeeded by Dana Perino. He was appointed to the BBG by Presidents Clinton and Bush and was confirmed by the U.S. Senate for four terms.

== U.S. Senate (2009–2010) ==
=== Appointment ===
On November 24, 2008, Delaware Governor Ruth Ann Minner announced her intention to appoint Kaufman to replace Biden in the Senate. He was appointed on January 15, 2009, the same day Biden resigned his seat, and was sworn in the next day. Kaufman served in the Senate until his successor, Chris Coons, was elected in a special election in 2010 to finish out the term. Kaufman chose not to run for a full term.

Kaufman inherited appointments to the same two committees that his predecessor, Biden, had served on before his resignation – the Committee on Foreign Relations and the Committee on the Judiciary.

=== Tenure ===
Early in his term, Kaufman supported the American Recovery and Reinvestment Act of 2009 (ARRA). The stimulus package resulted in more than $800 million in federal funding to support Delaware's economic recovery.

In July 2009, Kaufman participated in the Senate Judiciary Committee's Supreme Court nomination hearing for Judge Sonia Sotomayor. During the hearing, Kaufman's line of questioning focused on the current Court's recent treatment of business cases and Judge Sotomayor's judicial approach. Kaufman voted to send Judge Sotomayor's nomination to the full Senate for a vote. In June 2010 Kaufman participated in the Senate Judiciary Committee's Supreme Court nomination hearing for Judge Elena Kagan. Kaufman voted to send Judge Kagan's nomination to the full Senate for a vote.

In response to his perception that "people just feel it's perfectly okay to denigrate federal employees", Kaufman gave speeches once a week starting in May 2009 praising a different federal employee until the end of his term. Kaufman was succeeded by Chris Coons, a Democrat, after Coons defeated Republican nominee Christine O'Donnell in November 2010. Kaufman resigned, and Coons took office on November 15, 2010, by Delaware state law and Senate rules.

==== Financial industry ====
As a member of the Senate Judiciary Committee, Kaufman introduced bipartisan legislation with Senators Patrick Leahy (D-VT) and Chuck Grassley (R-IA) to strengthen tools and increase resources available to federal prosecutors to combat financial fraud. The Fraud Enforcement and Recovery Act of 2009 (FERA) was signed into law by President Obama on May 20, 2009.

Kaufman further sought to restore confidence in the U.S. financial markets by introducing bipartisan legislation to address abusive short selling and other market manipulation. Kaufman urged the Securities Exchange Commission (SEC) to consider reinstating the "uptick rule" – which aids market stability and hampers price discovery. He gave multiple floor statements and wrote numerous letters to the agency with Senate colleagues on this issue and the need for a pre-borrow requirement or a "hard locate" system for short sales.

In 2010, Kaufman, along with Senator Sherrod Brown (D-OH), introduced an amendment to the then-proposed Dodd–Frank Wall Street Reform and Consumer Protection Act, known as the Brown–Kaufman amendment. The amendment would have limited the non-deposit liabilities of banks to two percent of gross domestic product, effectively curtailing the size to which banks could grow. Kaufman stated on the Senate floor his intention to recapture the spirit of the Glass–Steagall Act, passed in 1933, which had been rescinded in 1999. The amendment failed in a Senate vote of 61 to 33 on May 6, 2010.

==== Foreign affairs ====
In April 2009, Kaufman took his first trip to Iraq, Afghanistan, and Pakistan, where he visited with U.S. troops, foreign leaders, and others to examine U.S. strategy in the region. He is a co-sponsor of the Enhanced Partnership with Pakistan Act of 2009, which will triple non-military aid to Pakistan, providing $1.5 billion per year for development over the next five years. Kaufman has also stressed the need for increased civilian-military training focused on counterinsurgency and stability operations as essential to success in Afghanistan, introducing an amendment to the 2009 Defense Supplemental Appropriations Bill with Senators Richard Lugar (R-IN) and Jack Reed (D-RI). Kaufman has since visited Afghanistan, Iraq and Pakistan twice more.

In May 2009, Kaufman visited Israel, Syria, and Turkey to discuss regional security issues and areas of mutual interest and cooperation. He met with foreign governments, military officials, political leaders, and civil society representatives. During the 2009–2010 Iranian election protests, Kaufman introduced a resolution supporting the protesters that was unanimously passed in the Senate. Kaufman also introduced the Victim of Iranian Censorship Act (VOICE) as an amendment to the 2009 National Defense Authorization Act. The VOICE Act – unanimously adopted by the Senate – supports similar objectives and authorizes funding for the Broadcasting Board of Governors to expand transmission capability and programming on Radio Farda and the Persian News Network. Kaufman spoke out for freedom of the press in China.

==== Education reform ====
Kaufman sponsored the Science, Technology, Engineering and Mathematics ("STEM") Education Coordination Act to establish a committee to coordinate the efforts of Federal STEM education programs. Kaufman also supported the Edward M. Kennedy National Service Act, which provided increased service opportunities for engineers and scientists to help inspire a new generation of science and technology students. In 2010 Kaufman was presented with the American Society of Mechanical Engineers 2010 President's Award for his work on promoting STEM education.

=== Committee assignments ===
- Committee on Armed Services
- Committee on Foreign Relations
  - Subcommittee on Near Eastern and South and Central Asian Affairs
  - Subcommittee on African Affairs
  - Subcommittee on International Operations and Organizations, Human Rights, Democracy and Global Women's Issues
  - Subcommittee on European Affairs
- Committee on Homeland Security and Governmental Affairs
- Committee on the Judiciary
  - Subcommittee on Administrative Oversight and the Courts
  - Subcommittee on Antitrust, Competition Policy and Consumer Rights
  - Subcommittee on the Constitution
  - Subcommittee on Crime and Drugs
  - Subcommittee on Terrorism, Technology and Homeland Security
- Impeachment Trial Committee on the Articles against Judge G. Thomas Porteous Jr.

== Congressional Oversight Panel (2010–2011) ==
Senator Harry Reid, the Senate Majority Leader, appointed Kaufman to replace Elizabeth Warren on the Congressional Oversight Panel on October 1, 2010. Three days later, Kaufman was unanimously elected as the panel's second chairman, succeeding Warren in that capacity as well. He remained chairman of the panel despite the expiration of his Senate term.

== Post-Senate career ==
Since 1991, Kaufman has taught a course on the United States Congress in the law school of his alma mater, Duke University, as well as "Government, Business, and Public Policy in the Global Economy" for law and business students at Duke. From 1995 to 1999 he was co-chair of the Duke Law School Center for the Study of the Congress.

Kaufman is currently a member of the board of trustees of the Institute of International Education. He is also co-chair of the Delaware STEM Council.

In September 2014, Kaufman joined the board of directors of the National Democratic Institute for International Affairs.

Ahead of the 2020 United States presidential election, Kaufman was made a co-chair of the Biden-Harris Transition Team, which planned the presidential transition of Joe Biden.

== Personal life ==
Kaufman and his wife, Lynne, have been married since 1960 and reside in Wilmington. They have three daughters and seven grandchildren. He was a member of the Board of Directors of Children and Families First, WHYY, and the Board of Trustees of Christiana Care. Close to Biden for many years, Kaufman has been described as Biden's "best friend" and alter ego.

== Recognition ==
In January 2025, President Joe Biden named Kaufman as a recipient of the Presidential Citizens Medal, along with nineteen others.

U.S. Senate
Preceded by Joe Biden	United States Senator (Class 2) from Delaware; 2009–2010; Served alongside: Tom Carper	Succeeded by Chris Coons
Government offices
Preceded by Elizabeth Warren	Chair of the Congressional Oversight Panel; 2010–2011	Position abolished
U.S. order of precedence (ceremonial)
Preceded by Mark Begich as Former U.S. Senator	Order of precedence of the United States	Succeeded by Jon Corzine as Former U.S. Senator
