= Rory Gamble =

Former American trade union leader

- Born: 1956 (age 68–69)
- Occupation(s): American factory worker, trade unionist
- Known for: Acting president of the United Auto Workers (UAW)

Rory Gamble (born 1956) is an American factory worker and trade unionist.

In November 2019, Gamble became the acting president of the United Auto Workers (UAW) following the abrupt resignation of his predecessor, Gary Jones. Jones was charged with and later convicted on fraud charges. He became the first African-American president of the UAW approximately one month after the conclusion of the 2019 General Motors strike. Because of the scandal which brought him to the position of president, UAW faced a potential federal takeover, which he was able to avoid by agreeing to financial safeguards and a court-appointed monitor to oversee operations for six years as well as direct election of UAW officers by membership. On June 30, 2021, Gamble retired from the post and was replaced by Ray Curry. In July 2022, Gamble was awarded the title of "President Emeritus" by the UAW.

Trade union offices
Preceded by Gary Jones	President of the United Auto Workers; 2019–2021	Succeeded by Ray Curry
