= Gary Jones (unionist) =

American labor union leader and criminal

Gary Jones (born September 1956) is a former American labor union leader, who was convicted of embezzlement.

Jones began working as a furnace operator for the Ford Motor Company in Broken Arrow, Oklahoma, in 1975. There, he joined the United Auto Workers (UAW). He qualified as an accountant, and in 1990, began working in the UAW's accountancy department. He became the union's chief accountant in 1991, and then in 1995 became assistant to the union's secretary-treasurer. In 2004, he was appointed as assistant director of the union's Region 5, covering the west and southwest of the United States, and then became director of the region in 2014.

In 2018, Jones was elected as president of the UAW, arguing for the union to be more militant, to work for social justice, and to support local communities. Under his leadership, union members who worked for the General Motors Company undertook a 40-day long strike. In 2019, he was implicated in an embezzlement case, and the union's executive filed papers to remove him from office; he stood down before the paperwork was served.

In 2021, Jones was sentenced to 28 months in prison for using union money to pay for personal expenses. Several other UAW leaders, including Jones' predecessor as president, were also convicted. Jones was given a shorter sentence as a result of assisting the investigation.

Trade union offices
Preceded by Dennis Williams	President of the United Auto Workers; 2018–2019	Succeeded by Rory Gamble
