= Wilhelm Lehmann (disambiguation) =

Wilhelm Lehmann (1882–1968) was a German teacher and writer.

Wilhelm Lehmann name may also refer to:

- Gottfried Wilhelm Lehmann (1799–1882), German engraver and congregation leader
- Jacob Heinrich Wilhelm Lehmann (1800–1863), German astronomer

== See also ==
- William Lehman (disambiguation)
- Wilhelm Ehmann
