= 2022–23 United Auto Workers international union election =

Union election

- October 17, 2022 (first round); January 12, 2023 (runoff)
- Turnout: 103,495
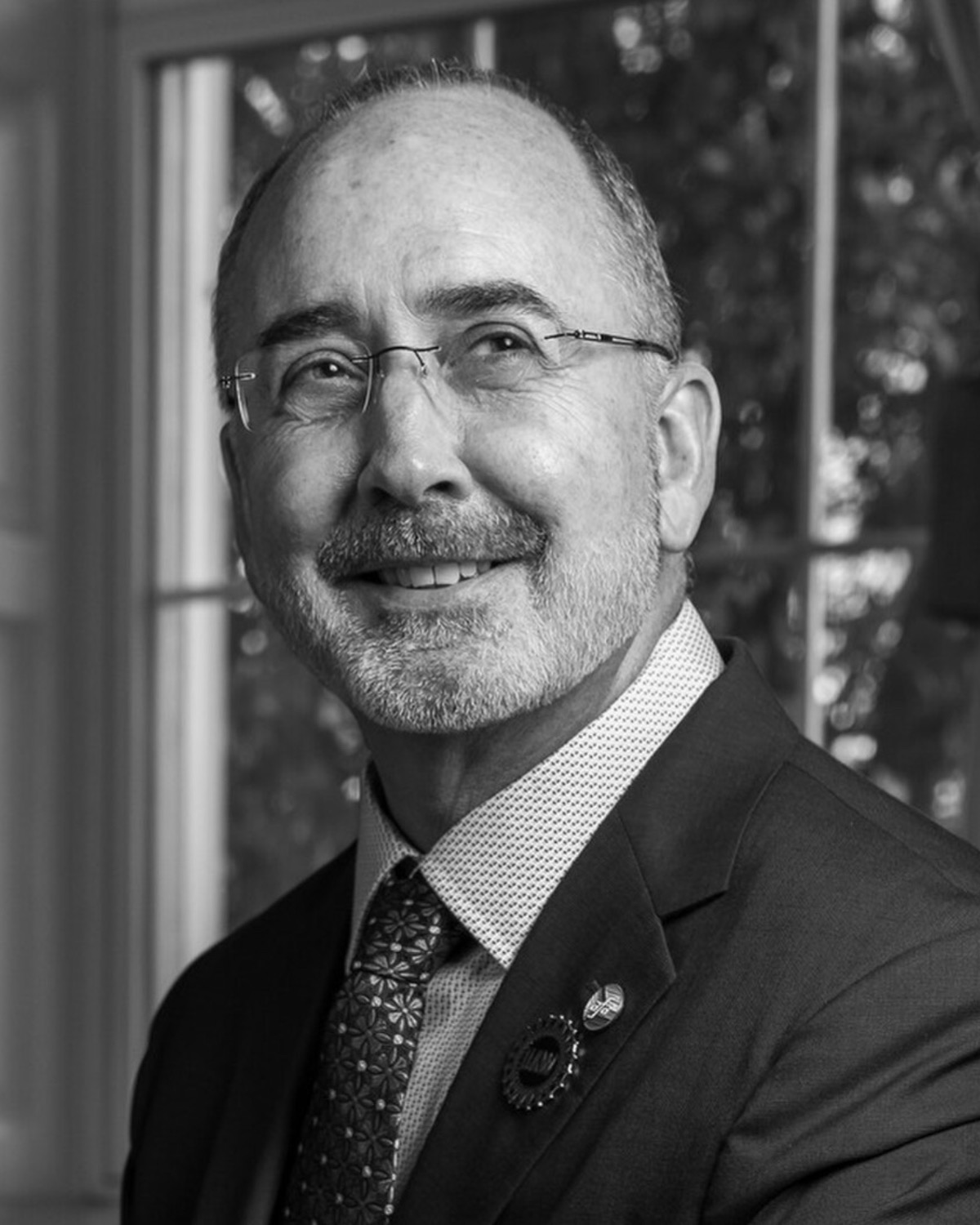

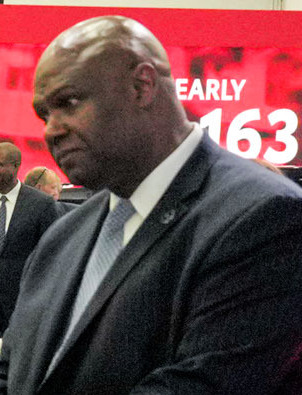

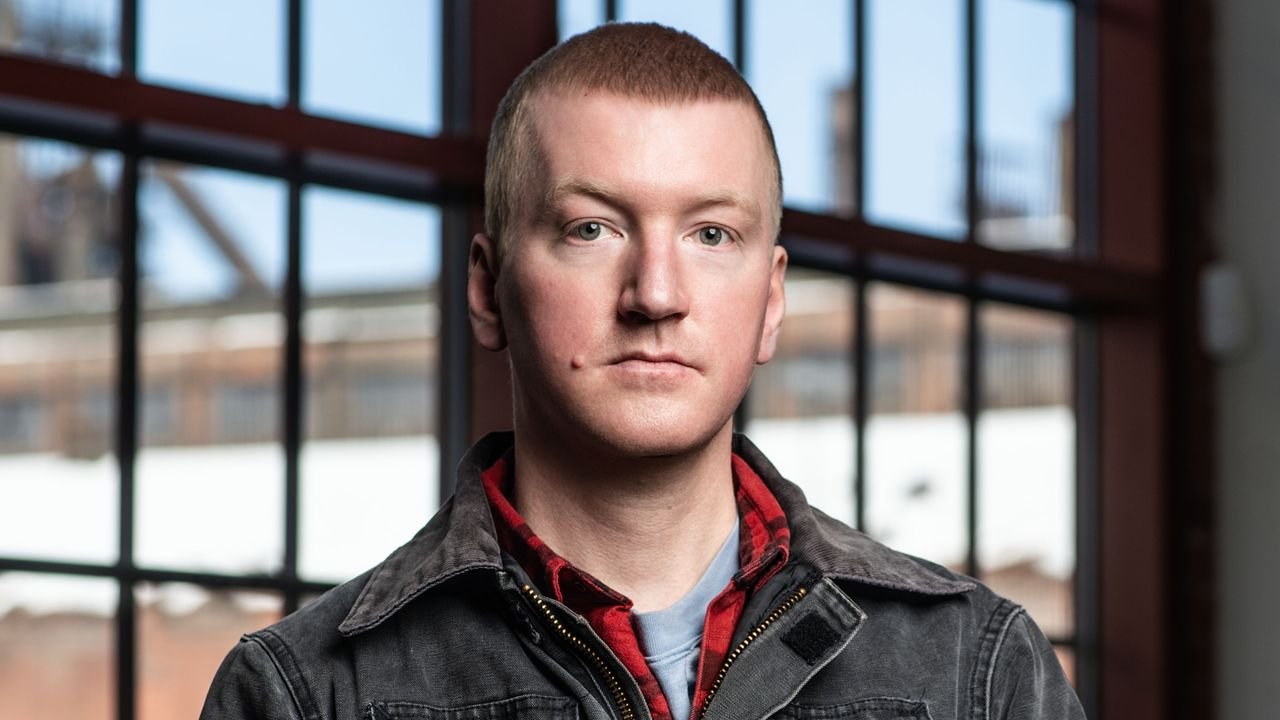
Candidate	Shawn Fain	Ray Curry	Brian L. Keller
Popular vote	38,958	39,572	14,561
Percentage	37.6%	38.2%	14.1%
Runoff vote	69,487; 50.1%	69,010; 49.8%
Candidate	Mark Gibson	Will Lehman
Popular vote	5,627	4,777
Percentage	5.4%	4.6%
President before election
Ray Curry
Elected President
Shawn Fain

The first direct election of a United Auto Workers president was held in 2022. The results expressed a "wave of opposition to the established leadership," in response to longstanding corruption that saw many UAW leaders jailed, according to The New York Times.

Ballots went out in October, and counting began in November. The incumbent Ray Curry and Shawn Fain proceeded to a runoff, which Fain won. The election as a whole was marked by low turnout, resulting in a legal challenge by Will Lehman.

In addition to the position of union president, many leadership positions including those of secretary, treasurer and various regional directors were also up for election, with incumbents generally losing to opposition candidates.

== Results ==
Candidate	First round		Second round	
Candidate	Votes	%	Votes	%
Shawn Fain	38,958	37.64	69,487	50.17
Ray Curry	39,572	38.24	69,010	49.83
Brian L. Keller	14,561	14.07		
Mark Gibson	5,627	5.44		
Will Lehman	4,777	4.62		
Total	103,495	100.00	138,497	100.00
Source: Court-Appointed, Independent Monitor of the UAW
