= Christy Goldsmith Romero =

American lawyer and government official

Christy Romero
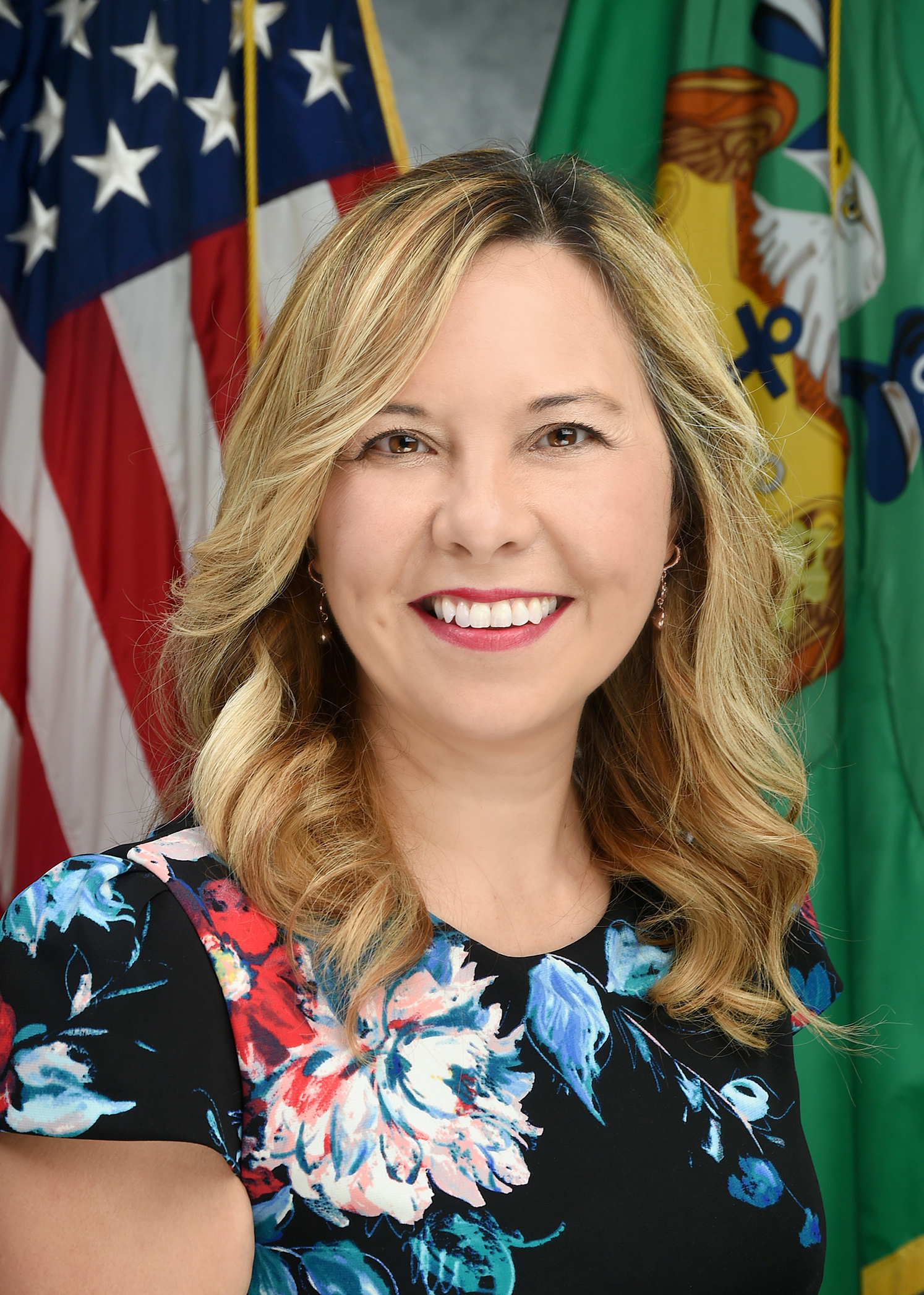
- Official portrait, 2019

Commissioner of the Commodity Futures Trading Commission
- In office March 30, 2022 – May 31, 2025
- President: Joe Biden; Donald Trump
- Preceded by: Heath Tarbert
- Succeeded by: Michael Selig

Special Inspector General of the Troubled Asset Relief Program
- In office April 1, 2011 – March 2022; Acting: April 1, 2011 – February 1, 2012
- President: Barack Obama; Donald Trump; Joe Biden
- Preceded by: Neil Barofsky
- Succeeded by: Melissa Bruce (acting)

Personal details
- Education: Old Dominion University (BS); Brigham Young University, Utah (JD)

Christy Goldsmith Romero is an American lawyer and federal government official. She served as a member of the Commodity Futures Trading Commission (CFTC) from 2022 to 2025, having been nominated by President Joe Biden.

From 2011 to 2022, she served as the Special Inspector General of the Troubled Asset Relief Program, a federal law enforcement agency and an independent audit watchdog that targets financial institution crime and other fraud, waste, and abuse related to the TARP bailout.

On June 10, 2024 The Wall Street Journal reported that she was expected to be named as the chairwoman of the Federal Deposit Insurance Corporation to replace the outgoing Martin Gruenberg.

== Early life ==
Christy Goldsmith Romero graduated from Old Dominion University, where she earned a bachelor of science in business. She subsequently earned a JD from the J. Reuben Clark Law School at Brigham Young University.

== Career ==
=== Early career ===
Goldsmith Romero began her career as a clerk to Judge Robert Clive Jones. She subsequently worked for the law firms Akin Gump Strauss Hauer & Feld, Snell & Wilmer and Jenner & Block. She investigated financial institution fraud, insider trading, and other violations of securities law as an attorney in the U.S. Securities and Exchange Commission's Division of Enforcement from 2003 to 2007. Goldsmith Romero also served as counsel to SEC Chairman Christopher Cox, a Republican, and SEC Chair Mary Schapiro, an Independent.

=== Special Inspector General for the Troubled Asset Relief Program (2011-2022) ===
Goldsmith Romero worked for the Office of the Special Inspector General for the Troubled Asset Relief Program since 2009. She served as the Special Inspector General of the Troubled Asset Relief Program from April 9, 2012 to March 2022.

In this capacity, she investigated financial institution crime related to the TARP bailout. Notable investigations by SIGTARP include Wilmington Trust, Sonoma Valley Bank, General Motors, United Commercial Bank, Morgan Stanley, Ally Financial, Bank of the Commonwealth, Jefferies, RBS, and SunTrust.

In October 2016, Goldsmith Romero called on Congress to pass legislation which would require senior executives at the six largest Wall Street banks that took TARP bailout funds to sign an annual certification to law enforcement that they have conducted due diligence and can certify that there is no criminal conduct or civil fraud within their organization. As a result of SIGTARP investigations, 430 defendants have been criminally charged. Nearly 300 defendants have been sentenced to prison, including 76 bankers and 85 of their co-conspirators. The bankers sentenced include many presidents, chief executive officers and other executives at medium and small bankers. SIGTARP investigations have also led to 24 enforcement actions against banks and other companies. In comparison, she said, "we have faced significant difficulties proving criminal intent of senior officials in large organizations that are designed to insulate high level officials from knowing about crime or civil fraud." And in October 2017, describing the threat of financial institution fraud as "so serious and harmful as to require constant law enforcement expertise with dedicated resources," she called for a permanent law enforcement office with a narrow mandate to investigate financial institution fraud.

In May 2017, Goldsmith Romero expressed concern over President Trump's budget cuts, saying they would interfere with the agency's ability to "conduct ongoing and new criminal investigations." In August 2017, she told the Financial Times, "Our nation cannot afford to take our eye off the ball when it comes to crime or other illegal practices inside banks that require law enforcement response."

In this role, Goldsmith Romero testified before Congress on the auto bailout, executive pay, and the Hardest Hit Fund, among other issues.

=== Commissioner of the Commodity Futures Trading Commission (2022-2025) ===
In September 2021, President Joe Biden announced his intent to nominate Goldsmith Romero as a commissioner of the Commodity Futures Trading Commission. She was confirmed by the United States Senate on March 28, 2022, and sworn in on March 30. She resigned from the commission in May 2025.

== Personal life ==
Goldsmith Romero is openly bisexual. She is married to Adrianne, has three daughters and a step-son.
