= John Malcolm Smith =

American soldier

- Born: April 2, 1922; Owatonna, Minnesota, U.S.
- Died: June 9, 1981 (aged 59); Owatonna
- Military career
- Allegiance: United States of America
- Branch: United States Navy
- Service years: 1942–1972
- Rank: Captain
- Nickname: "Smitty"
- Conflicts: World War II; Korean War
- Awards: Silver Star; Distinguished Flying Cross (5)

John Malcolm Smith (April 2, 1922 – June 9, 1981) was an American combat pilot and United States Navy fighter ace during World War II. He was credited with shooting down 10 Japanese aircraft during the last two years of the Pacific War, participating in the Solomon Islands and the Volcano and Ryukyu Islands campaigns as well as the air raids on Japan. Smith received his law degree in 1950 and served in the United States Naval Reserve until his retirement in 1972.

== Early life ==
Smith was born in Owatonna, Minnesota, on April 2, 1922. His parents were Wilbur, an electrician, and Anne, née Foran. He graduated from Owatonna High School in 1939.

== Military career ==
Smith enlisted for flight training on May 22, 1942, and became a qualified naval aviator on June 1, 1943. He was commissioned as an ensign that same day. He was assigned to fighter squadron VF-17 in December which was flying the Chance Vought F4U-1A Corsair in the South Pacific. The unit was in reserve at that time to rest and receive replacements; new pilots received 50 hours of advanced flight training during this time that incorporated the lessons learned from the squadron's first combat tour. The squadron flew to Torokina Airfield on Bougainville Island on January 24, 1944, to begin combat missions as part of the Allied campaign to neutralize the Japanese fortress at Rabaul, New Guinea.

The following day, VF-17 were part of the 88 Allied fighters assigned to escort a large group of Douglas SBD Dauntless dive bombers and Grumman TBF Avenger torpedo bombers as they attacked Lakunai Airfield. The Japanese intercepted them with 92 fighters of their own and claimed to have destroyed 48 aircraft for the loss of 6 of their own. VF-17 claimed to have shot down 22 fighters in exchange for 2 Corsairs shot down, the only fighter losses suffered by the Allies that mission. The Allied aircraft returned to Lakunai on the morning of January 27 as 19 North American B-25 Mitchell bombers were escorted by 64 Allied fighters. The Japanese intercepted with 30–40 fighters; they claimed to have shot down 23 Allied fighters while losing 6. Allied fighter claims and losses mirrored the Japanese claims at 23 shot down for 6 lost. VF-17 contributed 8 fighters to the escort for the small airstrike against Lakunai later that afternoon that the Japanese did not attack. This established the pattern for the squadron's deployment on Bougainville; escorting bombers conducting daily attacks on targets around Rabaul such as Lanakai, Vunakanau and Tobera Airfields. Smith claimed a Mitsubishi A6M Zero fighter probably destroyed on January 29 during a mission targeting Tobera that saw the Americans claim 17 Japanese fighters destroyed in the air although the Japanese only lost 5. He claimed another Zero probably destroyed the following day while covering North American B-25 Mitchell bombers attacking Lakunai.

VF-17 escorted an anti-shipping mission against vessels in Simpson Harbor on 17 February; Smith spotted a group of a dozen Zeros climbing to attack the bombers and was able to shoot down one in flames. During the engagement, he lost track of the other Corsairs, but he did see the bombers beginning their dives. He dropped down to 8,000 ft (2,400 m) to cover them and damaged a Zero that was attempting to attack the bombers. Still unable to locate the rest of VF-17, Smith flew towards the rally point off Cape Gazelle. He saw an isolated Nakajima Ki-43 Hayabusa en route and damaged it, preferring to continue to the rally point than pursue the Japanese fighter. Smith was attacked from astern before he reached the cape by a Zero; his Corsair was damaged, but he managed to evade his pursuer and reached home safely. He claimed a Zero in confused fighting the following day that saw him and a Japanese pilot misidentify each other over Cape Gazelle; Smith was the first to properly identify his opponent and promptly set it on fire. He claimed a Nakajima Ki-44 fighter on 19 February. Later that day, the Japanese began evacuating the majority of their aircraft from Rabaul to Truk with most of them departing on 20 February; VF-17 never saw a Japanese aircraft again. The unit was withdrawn from Bougainville on 8 March and subsequently given leave in Hawaii. The squadron was disbanded on 10 April. Smith was awarded the Distinguished Flying Cross for his service with VF-17.

VF-84 was formed on 1 May from a cadre of ex-VF-17 pilots; it is uncertain exactly when Smith joined the unit as the assistant engineering officer. The squadron trained on the Corsair for the rest of the year, aside from a few weeks on Grumman F6F Hellcats. It flew aboard the aircraft carrier USS Bunker Hill on 24 January 1945. The carrier reached Ulithi Atoll on 7 February where she was assigned to Task Group 58.3, part of the Fast Carrier Task Force of the 5th Fleet. Smith, now a lieutenant (junior grade), did not participate in the carrier's initial airstrikes on targets around Tokyo, Japan, on 16 February, but commanded a flight of Corsairs flying a defensive Combat Air Patrol near the task force's carriers. During which he shot down a Nakajima B5N torpedo bomber for his fourth victory. The task force turned south shortly afterwards and VF-84's pilots flew close air support and air field suppression missions during the opening stages of the Battle of Iwo Jima beginning on 19 February. The task force steamed back to the Japanese Home Islands four days later and began a new series of air strikes on 25 February, attacking airfields and industrial facilities. The task force withdrew to Ulithi a few days later, although they did attack targets on Okinawa en route on 1 March.

Task Force 58.3 departed Ulithi on 14 March and began operations off Kyushu on 18 March. VF-84 participated in the air strike on the naval base of Kure the following day, during which some Corsairs attacked facilities and ships in the naval base. On 23 March Bunker Hill's aircraft attacked airfields and installations in Okinawa and the surrounding area to soften up the defenses for the invasion scheduled for 1 April. The carrier continued to support operations on Okinawa for the next several months, VF-84 flying ground support and anti-kamikaze missions throughout. On morning of 7 April, the Japanese battleship Yamato and her escorts were spotted by American aircraft; the ships were on a suicide mission to destroy the American fleet off Okinawa. Bunker Hill was one of nine aircraft carriers that launched her aircraft when that spot report was received. Smith participated in the mission and VF-84 is known to have attacked the Yamato and her escorts. On 28 April Smith shot down three Nakajima Ki-27 fighter trainers during a single sortie. He claimed two Ki-27s and a Zero in similar circumstances on the morning of 11 May, increasing his tally to ten Japanese aircraft. Bunker Hill was crippled by two successful kamikaze attacks a few hours later and was forced to return to the United States for repairs. Smith received four additional Distinguished Flying Crosses and five Air Medals during this tour of duty.

== Post-war activities ==
He transferred to the Navy Reserve after the war and served until retiring as a captain in September 1972. He attended Saint Mary's College in Winona, Minnesota after the war, and graduated from Creighton University Law School in 1950. Smith married Therese Martin that same year and they had seven children. He served one term as the county attorney for Steele County, Minnesota, in 1958–1962. He died on June 9, 1981 in Owatonna and was buried there.

== Bibliography ==
- Blackburn, Tom (1989). The Jolly Rogers: The Story of Tom Blackburn and Navy Fighting Squadron VF-17. New York: Orion Books. ISBN 0-517-57075-0.
- Cleaver, Thomas McKelvey (2021). Under the Southern Cross: The South Pacific Air Campaign against Rabaul. Oxford: Osprey Publishing. ISBN 978-1-4728-3822-3.
- Cook, Lee (1998). The Skull & Cross Bones Squadron: VF-17 in World War II. Atglen, Pennsylvania: Schiffer Publishing. ISBN 0-7643-0475-5.
- Dunn, Richard L. (2024). South Pacific Air War: The Role of Air Power in the New Guinea and Solomon Islands Campaigns, January 1943 to February 1944. Atglen, Pennsylvania: Schiffer Military. ISBN 978-0-7643-6787-8.
- Jacobs, Jan & Tillman, Barrett (August 1990). "The Wolf Gang: A History of Carrier Air Group 84". The Hook: Journal of Carrier Aviation. 18 (Special Issue): 78–87. ISSN 0736-9220.
- Olynyk, Frank J. (1995). Stars and Bars: A Tribute to the American Fighter Ace 1920–1973. London: Grub Street. ISBN 1-898697-17-5.
- Staff (June 10, 1981). "John M. Smith Dies at Age 59". Owatonna People's Press. ISSN 0890-2860.
