= Ray Curry =

American trade union leader

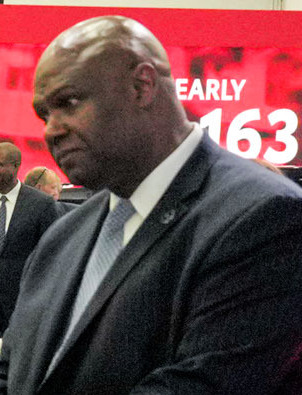
Curry in 2022

Ray Curry is an American former trade union leader. From July 2021 to March 2023, Curry served as President of the United Auto Workers. He was elected by the UAW International Executive Board, replacing Rory Gamble, who was the first black president of the union; Curry was the second black president. He ran for re-election in 2022 in the first UAW officer election with members directly electing the president, 2022–23 United Auto Workers international union election. He lost the race to reform candidate Shawn Fain by 477 votes. Curry had previously served as Secretary-Treasurer from 2018 to 2021.

Curry received a Bachelor of Science degree in business administration/finance from the University of North Carolina at Charlotte and a Master of Business Administration degree from the University of Alabama. He joined the UAW when he worked as an assembler at Freightliner Trucks in Mount Holly, North Carolina. In 2004, he was hired by the union directly as a staffer.

Trade union offices
Preceded by Gary Casteel	Secretary-Treasurer of the United Auto Workers; 2018–2021	Succeeded by Frank Stuglin
Preceded by Rory Gamble	President of the United Auto Workers; 2021–2023	Succeeded by Shawn Fain
