= Damon Silvers =

American lawyer

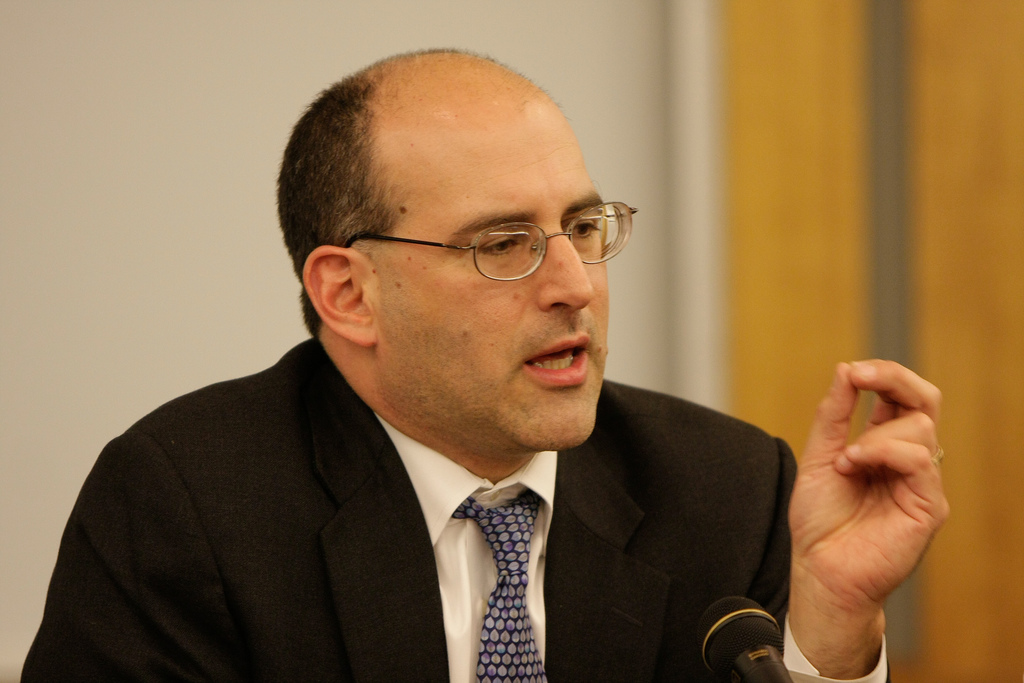

Personal details
- Born: Cambridge, Massachusetts
- Education: Harvard University (BA, JD, MBA); King's College, Cambridge

Damon Silvers is an American lawyer and former government employee who has served as a policy director for the AFL-CIO, the U.S. labour federation. As of August 2026 he is Visiting Professor in Labour Markets and Innovation at UCL Institute for Innovation and Public Purpose in London.

== Early life and education ==
Damon Silvers was born in Cambridge, Massachusetts, and grew up in Richmond, Virginia, where he attended high school.

He graduated summa cum laude from Harvard College in 1986, and received his J.D. with honors from Harvard Law School. He received his M.B.A. with high honors from Harvard Business School as a Baker Scholar. Silvers also studied history at King's College, Cambridge.

He was one of two undergraduates invited by Local 26 of the union which represented Harvard's dining hall staff to join their negotiating team in 1986.

== Career ==
Silvers clerked at the Delaware Court of Chancery for Chancellor William T. Allen.

On November 14, 2008, he was appointed by Speaker of the House Nancy Pelosi and the majority leader of the Senate Harry Reid to serve on the five-member Congressional Oversight Panel created to oversee the implementation of the Emergency Economic Stabilization Act. He served as deputy chair until 2010.

Silvers was policy director of the AFL-CIO from 2009 until 2019, and then senior strategic advisor and special counsel to the president of the AFL-CIO from 2019 to 2022. He led the AFL-CIO legal team that won severance payments for laid off Enron and WorldCom workers.

In November 2020, Silvers was named a volunteer member of the Joe Biden presidential transition Agency Review Team to support transition efforts related to the United States Department of Treasury and the Federal Reserve.

From 2019 until and as of August 2026, Silvers has been Visiting Professor in Labour Markets and Innovation at UCL Institute for Innovation and Public Purpose in London, England.

== Other activities and memberships ==
As of 2026 Silvers is a Senior Fellow of the Roosevelt Institute, a member of the Investor Advisory Committee of the Securities and Exchange Commission, the Public Company Accounting Oversight Board's Investor Advisory Group, the The Century Foundation's Board of Trustees, and is a member of the board of the investor coalition CERES.

He has previously been a member of the Financial Accounting Standards Board User Advisory Council and the American Academy of Arts and Sciences Corporate Governance Task Force.
