= Sheila Krumholz =

Former American nonprofit executive

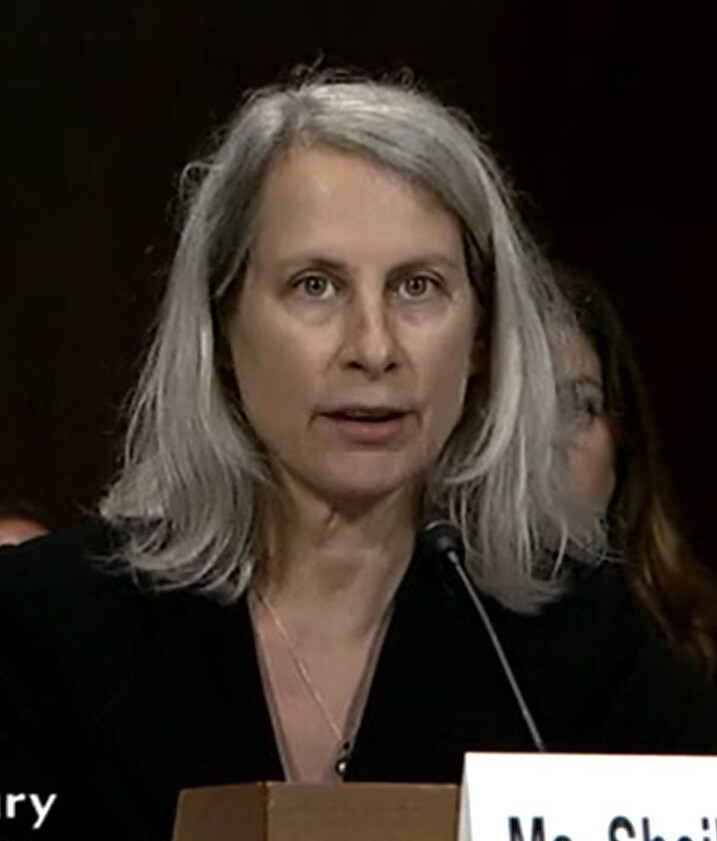
- Krumholz in 2019
- Born: 1964 or 1965 (age 60–61); Owatonna, Minnesota
- Education: Owatonna Senior High School; University of Minnesota (1988)
- Known for: Former executive director of OpenSecrets

Sheila Krumholz (born 1964 or 1965) is the former executive director of OpenSecrets.

== Biography ==
Krumholz was born and raised in Owatonna, Minnesota. She grew up in an apolitical family, the second-youngest of eight children. She attended Owatonna Senior High School. She graduated from the University of Minnesota in 1988, with majors in international relations and Spanish language and a minor in political science.

In 1989, she was hired as an associate editor by the predecessor of OpenSecrets, a research group based in Washington, D.C., eventually moving to research director.

She served as the executive director of the organization from 2006 until her retirement in 2023.

In March 2019, she testified to the United States House Appropriations Subcommittee on the Legislative Branch on improving lobbyist tracking data.

== Awards and recognition ==
In 2010, Fast Company named her one of the most influential women in technology.

In 2022, she was named as one of the 500 most influential people in Washington by Washingtonian.

== Personal life ==
Krumholz is married to Daniel Oshtry and has two children.

== See also ==
- List of people from Washington, D.C.
- List of University of Minnesota people
