= OpenSecrets =

Government watchdog group based in the U.S.

- Founded: 1983; 43 years ago
- Founders: Frank Church; Hugh Scott
- Merger of: Center for Responsive Politics; National Institute on Money in Politics
- Type: Research
- Tax ID no.: 52-1275227
- Legal status: 501(c)(3)
- Purpose: Campaign finance in the United States
- Location: Washington, D.C.
- Coordinates: 38.9037°N 77.0300°W
- Region served: United States
- Chair, board of directors: Bert Brandenburg
- Executive director: Hilary Braseth (December 2023 – present)
- Revenue: $2.5 million (2023)
- Expenses: $4.3 million (2023)
- Website: opensecrets.org

OpenSecrets is an American nonprofit organization based in Washington, D.C., that tracks and publishes data on campaign finance and lobbying, including a revolving door database that documents the individuals who have worked in both the public sector and lobbying firms and may have conflicts of interest. It was created from the 2021 merger of the Center for Responsive Politics (CRP) and the National Institute on Money in Politics (NIMP), both of which were organizations that tracked data on campaign finance in the United States and advocated for stricter regulation and disclosure of political donations.

Examples of investigations conducted by the organization include uncovering that Carolina Rising, a 501(c)(4) social welfare organization spent $4.7 million in 2014 on political ads in support of Thom Tillis, Senate candidate from North Carolina, and identifying that the Donald Trump 2020 presidential campaign was financially related to the rally that preceded the January 6 United States Capitol attack.

The organization is funded by donations. Since 2020, the largest donors have been: the Carnegie Corporation of New York, Democracy Fund, the Gaia Fund, Google, the Hewlett Foundation, the Kaphan Foundation, Mertz Gilmore Foundation, the Omidyar Network, Open Society Foundations, the Popplestone Foundation, and the Rockefeller Brothers Fund. In 2023, the organization reported $2.5 million in revenue and $4.3 million in expenses. In 2024, having serious financial difficulties, OpenSecrets laid off a third of its staff.

== History ==
=== Center for Responsive Politics ===
The Center for Responsive Politics was founded in 1983 by retired two U.S. Senators, Frank Church of Idaho of the Democratic Party, and Hugh Scott of Pennsylvania of the Republican Party. In the 1980s, Church and Scott launched a "money-in-politics" project, whose outcome consisted of large, printed books. Their first book, Spending in Congressional Elections: A Never-Ending Spiral, published in 1988, analyzed spending patterns in congressional elections from 1974 through 1986, including 1986 soft money contributions in five states. The first data was published by CRP in 1990 and the website OpenSecrets.org was launched in 1996, making the data more readily available.

=== National Institute on Money in Politics ===
The National Institute on Money in Politics traces its roots to the "Money in Western Politics" project launched in 1991 and funded by the MacArthur Foundation. Prior to 1991, data was not digitized and therefore, was not easily available. In 1999, three regional teams merged to form NIMP, based in Helena, Montana. The organization published the Follow The Money website, where it compiled political funding information from government disclosure agencies. The organization did not receive any government funding and relied on philanthropic efforts; among its donations received was $2.3 million in funding from Open Society Foundations.

=== Leadership history ===
Sheila Krumholz, who joined the organization in 1989, was the executive director of OpenSecrets and its predecessor from December 2006, having previously served as research director, until December 2023.

== See also ==
- Institute for Nonprofit News (member)
