= Shawn Fain =

American labor leader (born 1968)

- Fain in 2026

15th President of the United Auto Workers
- Incumbent
- Assumed office March 26, 2023
- Preceded by: Ray Curry

Personal details
- Born: October 30, 1968 (age 58) Kokomo, Indiana, U.S.
- Children: 2
- Fain's voice Fain on the benefits of unionization Recorded November 14, 2023.

Shawn Fain (born October 30, 1968) is an American labor unionist who has served as president of the United Auto Workers (UAW) since March 2023. An electrician by trade, he worked at a Chrysler automotive parts plant in Kokomo, Indiana. He has been a UAW member since 1994, and was a member of the now-dissolved reform caucus, Unite All Workers for Democracy (UAWD). The first UAW president directly elected by union members, Fain was a central figure in the 2023 United Auto Workers strike.

In 2022, Fain ran for the presidency of the union against incumbent Ray Curry, leading a slate named UAW Members United that focused on opposing corruption, concessions, and tiered pay structures. In the first election in which members of the union directly elected the president, 2022–23 United Auto Workers international union election, Fain won the election by a narrow margin and took office in March.

In office, he advocates a more aggressive negotiating style, more member participation, and for the union to actively support politicians who share the union's agenda. Fain's relative labor militancy and bargaining style contributed to the UAW's decision to authorize the 2023 United Auto Workers strike. The strike resulted in wage increases, cost of living adjustments, and the elimination of the tiered wage system.

Fain spoke at the 2024 Democratic National Convention on August 19, 2024.

== Early life ==
Fain was born in Kokomo, Indiana, on October 30, 1968. He is the grandson of two UAW GM retirees. His grandfather started at Chrysler in 1937, the year Chrysler workers joined the UAW after a sit-down strike. His father served as the police chief of the Kokomo Police Department. Fain is a graduate of Taylor High School.

== 2023 United Auto Workers strike ==
A few days after his election, Fain told the automakers that the UAW was "fed up with the status quo". During 2023 contract renegotiations, Fain advocated for an immediate wage increase of 20% for workers followed by yearly gradual increases for a total of 46%, which he argues would simply be a way to keep up with the enormous CEO wage increases of auto companies in recent decades. The UAW has since lowered the demanded increase to 36%. Fain is also calling for the end of tiered wages and benefits, and the roll-back of concessions made by the UAW during the 2008 financial crisis, including the reinstatement of cost-of-living adjustments and robust pensions. Fain's hard line stance during contract renegotiations contributed to the union's decision to begin the 2023 United Auto Workers strike on September 15. It is the first time in the UAW's 88-year history that the union has launched a simultaneous strike against the Big Three automakers.

Fain has garnered significant attention for his unorthodox approach to organizing, with analyst Daniel Ives telling Reuters, "This is not your grandfather's UAW ... Fain is playing this like a chess player. He's leading 21st century negotiations for unions". Fain has embraced social media platforms during the negotiations, publishing short form documentary style videos.

In a profile in The New York Times of October 5, 2023, he stated: "Billionaires in my opinion don't have a right to exist." He is also attributed with: "There's a billionaire class, and there's the rest of us."

He appears in frequent Facebook Lives where he directly addresses UAW members, quoting from the Bible and Malcolm X. In a livestream from early August 2023, Fain can be seen throwing an offer from automaker Stellantis into a waste basket, stating: "That's where it belongs – in the trash – because that's what it is". In September 2023, he said "The September strikes are so far proving effective, and should give employers second thoughts."

== 2023 mass auto organizing drive ==
At the end of the 2023 United Auto Workers strike, Fain pledged to unionize more automotive companies, saying, "When we return to the bargaining table in 2028 it won't just be with the Big Three, but with the Big Five or Big Six." On December 7, 2023, the UAW announced that autoworkers at the Volkswagen plant in Chattanooga, Tennessee, had begun a unionization effort, with over 1,000 members signing union cards.

== Positions ==
Fain supports a four-day workweek.

Under Fain the UAW endorsed Joe Biden and later Kamala Harris in the 2024 presidential election.

Fain criticized Trump's Executive Order 14251 (ending collective bargaining with Federal unions in a number of agencies) describing it as "100 times worse than PATCO ever dreamed of being." Surrounding the tariffs in the second Trump administration, Fain referred to "global tariffs" as "reckless" but "firmly supports an earlier round of tariffs on the U.S. auto industry".

Trade union offices
Preceded by Ray Curry	President of the United Auto Workers; 2023–	Succeeded by incumbent
