= Roger Maris =

American baseball player (1934–1985)

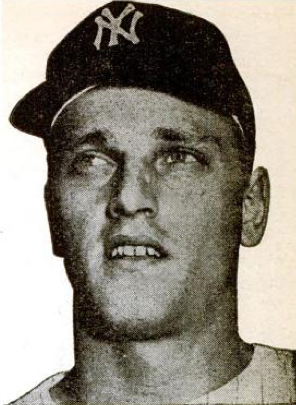
- Maris in 1960
- Right fielder
- Born: September 10, 1934; Hibbing, Minnesota, U.S.
- Died: December 14, 1985 (aged 51); Houston, Texas, U.S.
- Batted: Left Threw: Right

MLB debut
- April 16, 1957, for the Cleveland Indians

Last MLB appearance
- September 29, 1968, for the St. Louis Cardinals

MLB statistics
- Batting average: .260
- Home runs: 275
- Runs batted in: 850
- Stats at Baseball Reference

Teams
- Cleveland Indians (1957–1958); Kansas City Athletics (1958–1959); New York Yankees (1960–1966); St. Louis Cardinals (1967–1968)

Career highlights and awards
- 7× All-Star (1959²–1962²); 3× World Series champion (1961, 1962, 1967); 2× AL MVP (1960, 1961); Gold Glove Award (1960); AL home run leader (1961); 2× AL RBI leader (1960, 1961); New York Yankees No. 9 retired; Monument Park honoree

Roger Eugene Maris (born Maras; September 10, 1934 – December 14, 1985) was an American professional baseball right fielder who played 12 seasons in Major League Baseball (MLB). He is best known for setting a new MLB single-season home run record with 61 home runs in 1961.

Maris played in the minor leagues from 1953 to 1956, and made his major league debut for the Cleveland Indians in 1957. He was traded to the Kansas City Athletics during the 1958 season, and to the New York Yankees after the 1959 season. Maris finished his playing career as a member of the St. Louis Cardinals in 1967 and 1968. Maris was an AL All-Star from 1959 through 1962, (Note: Major League Baseball held two All-Star Games for the years from 1959 to 1962.) the AL Most Valuable Player in 1960 and 1961, and an AL Gold Glove Award winner in 1960. Maris appeared in seven World Series; he played for Yankees teams that won the World Series in 1961 and 1962 and for a Cardinals team that won the World Series in 1967.

Maris's home run record was controversial, as the previous single-season home run record (60, set by Babe Ruth in 1927) was set during a period when MLB teams played 154 games per season. Maris broke Ruth's record in the year the AL baseball season was extended to 162 games, hitting his 61st home run in the last game of the season, which led to questions about the legitimacy of his record. However, he hit his first home run in the 11th game of the season, so that he hit all 61 within a 151-game span. Maris's major league record remained unbroken until Mark McGwire surpassed it in 1998; his AL record stood until 2022, when Aaron Judge hit 62 home runs for the New York Yankees.

== Early life ==
Roger Eugene Maris was born on September 10, 1934, in Hibbing, Minnesota; in 1955, his father changed the surname from Maras to Maris. Roger's parents, Rudolph S. "Rudy" Maras and Ann Corrine "Connie" (née Perkovich) were born in Minnesota, and were of Croatian heritage.

Maris's brother Rudolph, who was a year older, developed polio at age 18 in 1951. It was Rudolph who began Maris's baseball career. Maris recalls Rudolph forcing him to play the sport, saying that he physically would drag him out by his ear to play the game that he hated desperately. While he loved taking breaks from his schoolwork and spending time outdoors, he could not stand baseball. By the time he was playing baseball in high school, he no longer had to be forced to play and enjoyed the game. Maris's parents had a turbulent marriage and divorced in 1960. The Maris family moved to Grand Forks, North Dakota, in 1938, and to Fargo, North Dakota, in 1946. Maris entered Fargo Central High School in 1948. In 1950, Maris, a Catholic, transferred to Bishop Shanley High School in Fargo, and graduated from there in June 1952. Maris played both baseball and football for the Shanley Deacons. In football, Maris set a national high school record, which still stands, for most return touchdowns in a game, with four (two kickoff returns, one punt return, and one interception return). In that 1951 game, he also scored a fifth touchdown on a 32-yard run from scrimmage. He met his future wife, Patricia, in the tenth grade at a high school basketball game.

== Minor league baseball career ==
Maris began play for the Indians' minor league organization at Fargo (the Fargo-Moorhead Twins) in 1953. He was named rookie of the year in the Northern League, then moved on to Keokuk, Iowa, the next season. In four minor league seasons from 1953 to 1956, Maris hit .303 with 78 home runs and 353 runs batted in (RBI). In Game 2 of the 1956 Junior World Series, Maris, playing for the Indianapolis Indians of the American Association (Triple-A league), set a record by driving in seven runs. With all five teams for which Maris played in the minors, the clubs' win-loss records improved from the prior season.

== Major league baseball career ==
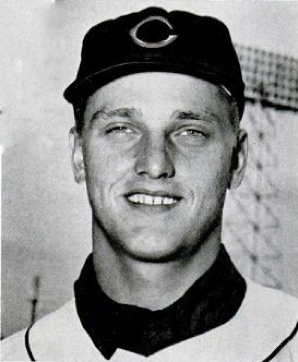
Maris with the Cleveland Indians in 1957

=== Cleveland Indians (1957–1958) ===
Maris made his major league debut on April 16, 1957, with the Cleveland Indians. He finished the game 3-for-5 with a run scored in a 3–2 loss against the Chicago White Sox. Two days later, he hit the first home run of his career, a grand slam off Detroit Tigers pitcher Jack Crimian at Briggs Stadium in Detroit. He finished his rookie season with a .235 average, 14 home runs and 51 RBI in 116 games. On June 15, 1958, after playing in 51 games and hitting .225 with nine home runs and 27 RBI for the Indians, he was traded to the Kansas City Athletics with Dick Tomanek and Preston Ward for Vic Power and Woodie Held.

=== Kansas City Athletics (1958–1959) ===
After the trade, Maris played in 99 games and hit .247 with 19 home runs and 53 RBI for Kansas City in 1958. In 1959, he played in 122 games and batted .273 with 16 home runs and 72 RBI; he missed 45 games during the second half of the season as a result of an appendix operation. He was selected to play in the second of two All-Star Games held that year. In the late 1950s, Kansas City frequently traded their best young players to the New York Yankees—a practice which led them to be referred to as the Yankees' "major league farm team"—and Maris was no exception. In a seven-player deal completed on December 11, 1959, he was sent to the Yankees with Kent Hadley and Joe DeMaestri in exchange for Marv Throneberry, Norm Siebern, Hank Bauer, and Don Larsen.

=== New York Yankees (1960–1966) ===
In his Yankees debut on April 19, 1960, Maris hit a single, double, and two home runs in an 8–4 win over the Boston Red Sox. He was named to the AL All-Star roster again and played in both games. He finished the season leading the AL in slugging percentage (.581), runs batted in (112), and extra base hits (64). He also hit 39 home runs and had a .283 batting average in 136 games. He won the American League's Most Valuable Player award and was recognized as an outstanding defensive outfielder with a Gold Glove Award. The Yankees won the American League pennant, the first of five consecutive pennants, but lost a seven-game World Series to the Pittsburgh Pirates culminating in Bill Mazeroski's dramatic walk-off home run. Maris hit .267 with two solo home runs, six runs scored and a double in the series loss.

==== 1961 ====
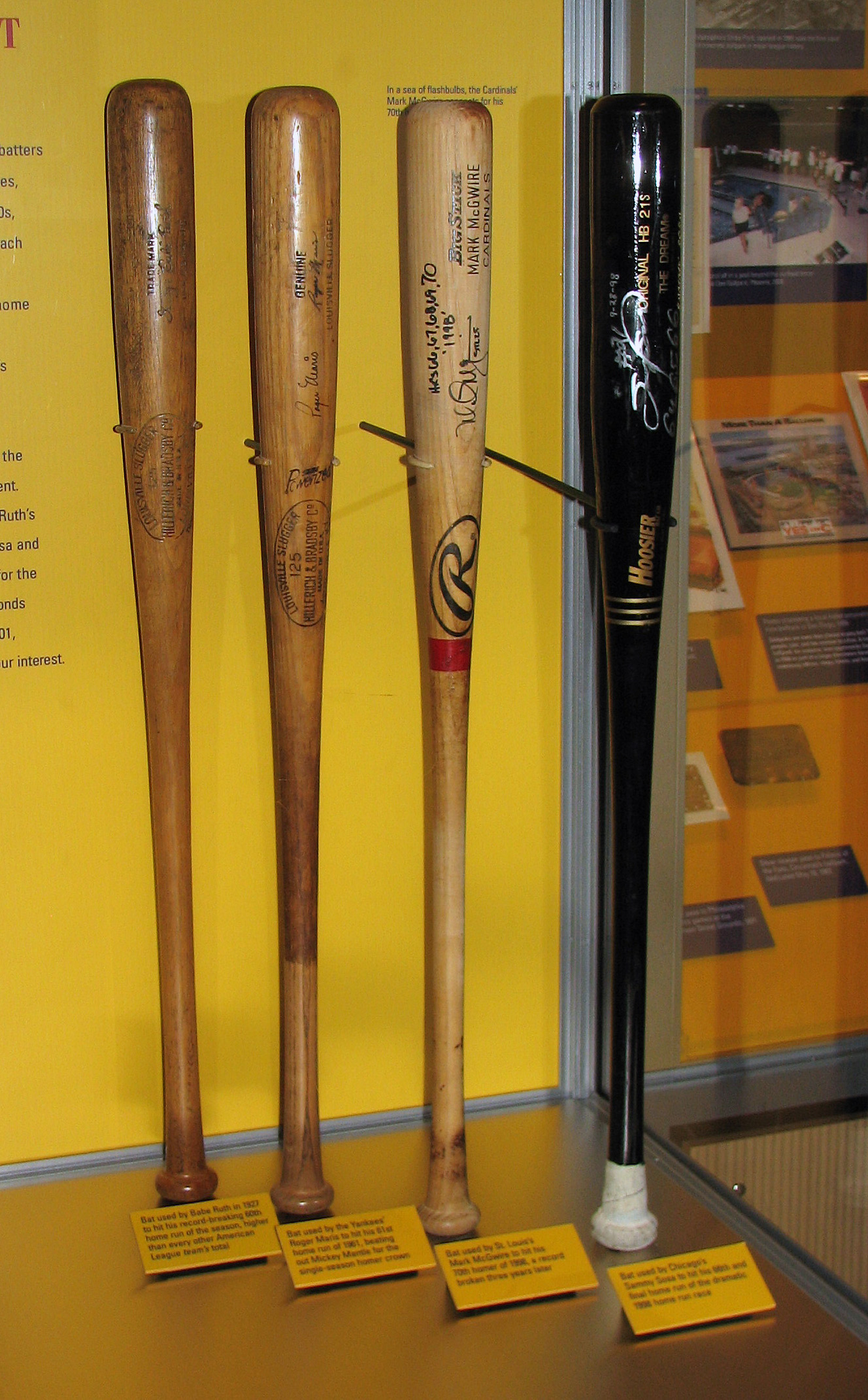
Left to right: Babe Ruth's 60th home run bat (1927), Roger Maris's 61st home run bat (1961), and Mark McGwire's and Sammy Sosa's 70th and 66th home run bats (1998)

In 1961, the AL expanded from eight to ten teams. In the expansion draft, the newly created Los Angeles Angels and Washington Senators (Note: The Washington Senators that took the field in 1961 were an expansion team, having replaced the original Senators franchise that had re-located to Minnesota and become the Minnesota Twins.) were restricted to drafting players from AL rosters. The perceived result was that American League team rosters had become watered down, as players who would otherwise have been playing at AAA, if not lower, were now in the AL. In order to maintain a balanced schedule, AL owners extended the season from 154 games to 162 games in 1961. (The National League expanded from eight to ten teams and its season to 162 games in 1962.) On January 23, 1961, an Associated Press reporter asked Maris whether the schedule changes might threaten Babe Ruth's single-season home run record; Maris replied, "Nobody will touch it ... Look up the records and you'll see that it's a rare year when anybody hits 50 homers, let alone 60."

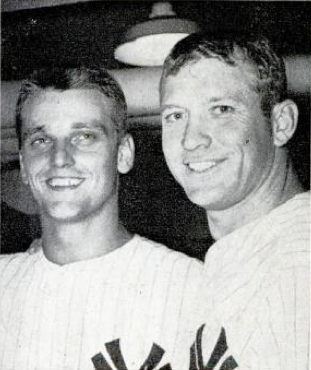
Maris (left) with Mickey Mantle in 1961

Yankee home runs began to come at a record pace. One famous photograph lined up six 1961 Yankees, including Mantle, Maris, Yogi Berra and Bill Skowron, under the nickname "Murderers Row", because they hit a combined 165 home runs the previous season (the title "Murderers Row", originally coined in 1918, had most famously been used to refer to the 1927 Yankees). As mid-season approached, it seemed quite possible that either Maris or Mantle, or perhaps both, would break Ruth's 34-year-old home run record. Sportswriters began to play the "M&M Boys" against each other, inventing a rivalry where none existed; in fact, the two men were friends and roommates. Mantle, however, was felled by a hip infection causing hospitalization late in the season, leaving Maris as the single remaining player with the opportunity to break Ruth's home run record. In the middle of the season, baseball commissioner Ford Frick (a friend of Ruth) announced at a press conference that unless Ruth's record was broken in the first 154 games of the season, the new record should be shown separately in the "record books," with some "distinctive mark" next to it indicating it had been done in a 162-game season. The asterisk as such a mark was immediately suggested by New York Daily News sportswriter Dick Young. In spite of its formality, Frick's so-called ruling was merely a suggestion: Major League Baseball had no direct control over any record books until many years later. As he closed in on Ruth's record, Maris received death threats and NYPD detective Kieran Burke was assigned to watch over him.

Maris had 59 home runs after the Yankees' 154th game and therefore failed to beat Ruth's 60 home runs within the original season length. Maris hit his 61st home run on October 1, 1961, in the fourth inning of the last game of the season, at Yankee Stadium in front of 23,154 fans. Boston Red Sox pitcher Tracy Stallard gave up the record home run, which was caught by fan Sal Durante in the right field bleachers. Maris was awarded the 1961 Hickok Belt as the top professional athlete of the year and won the American League's MVP Award for the second straight year. It is said, however, that the stress of pursuing the record was so great for Maris that his hair occasionally fell out in clumps during the season. Within a few years the asterisk controversy died down and all prominent baseball record keepers listed Maris as the single-season record holder. Maris ultimately finished his record-setting season with a .269 average, a major-league leading 132 runs scored, 61 home runs and an AL-leading 141 RBI in 161 games.

==== 1962–1966 ====
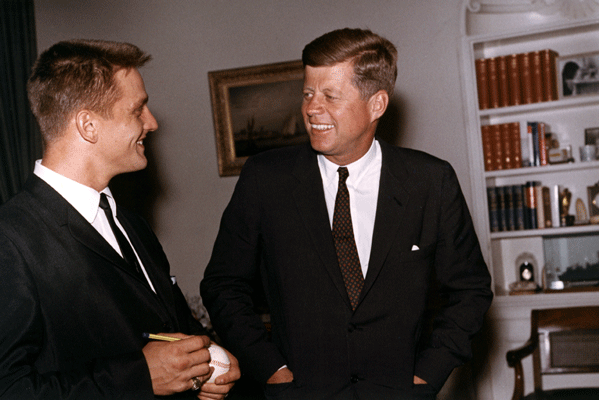
Maris signs a baseball for President John F. Kennedy in the 1962 season

In 1962, Maris made his fourth consecutive All-Star team appearance and his seventh and final All-Star game appearance. He batted .256 with 33 home runs and 100 RBI in 157 games. In Game 7 of the 1962 World Series, Maris made a game-saving play in the bottom of the ninth inning against the San Francisco Giants. With the Yankees leading 1–0 and Matty Alou on first, Willie Mays doubled toward the right-field line. Maris cut off the ball and made a strong throw to prevent Alou from scoring the tying run; the play set up Willie McCovey's series-ending line drive to second baseman Bobby Richardson, capping what would prove to be the final World Series title for the Yankees until 1977.

In 1963, Maris played in only 90 games, hitting .269 with 23 home runs and 53 RBI. Maris was injured in Game 2 of the 1963 World Series, in which the Yankees were swept by the Los Angeles Dodgers in four games.

In 1964, Maris rebounded, appearing in 141 games and batting .281 with 26 home runs and 71 RBI. Maris hit a home run in Game 6 of the 1964 World Series, in which the Yankees lost to the St. Louis Cardinals in seven games. In 1965, his physical problems returned, and he had off-season surgery to remove a bone chip in his hand. In 1966, the Yankees' and Maris's fortunes continued to decline as he played most of the season with a misdiagnosed broken bone in his hand. On December 8, 1966, he was traded to the St. Louis Cardinals for Charley Smith.

=== St. Louis Cardinals (1967–1968) ===
Maris played his final two seasons with the Cardinals, contributing to the team's 1967 and 1968 pennants, as well as the 1967 World Series championship. In the 1967 World Series, he hit .385 with a home run and 7 RBI, the best Series performance of Maris's career. In game 7 of the 1968 World Series, Maris was on deck when catcher Tim McCarver hit a foul pop up that ended the series.

== Media appearances ==
Maris and Mantle starred in a 1962 film, Safe at Home!, playing themselves. That year, Maris, Mantle, and Yankee teammate Yogi Berra also made appearances in the film That Touch of Mink, starring Cary Grant and Doris Day.

In 1980, Maris, Mantle, Whitey Ford, Elston Howard, and other former Yankee players made appearances in the film It's My Turn, starring Michael Douglas and Jill Clayburgh.

Maris's wife, Pat, appeared as herself on the October 2, 1961, episode of the game show To Tell the Truth. She received three of the four possible votes.

== Later years and death ==
In the 1970s and 1980s, Maris and his brother owned and operated Maris Distributing, the Budweiser beer distributorship in Gainesville, Florida (and Ocala, Florida), where he moved after retiring from baseball after the 1968 season. Gussie Busch, who owned the St. Louis Cardinals and Anheuser-Busch, had gotten Maris started in the beer business upon his arrival in St. Louis. Maris also coached baseball at Gainesville's Oak Hall High School, which named its baseball field after him in 1990.

In 1978, Maris returned to Yankee Stadium on Old-Timers' Day, ending a decade-long boycott from the Yankees. He was introduced by Mantle and got a standing ovation from the crowd.

Maris was diagnosed with non-Hodgkin lymphoma in 1983. In response, Maris organized the annual Roger Maris Celebrity Golf Tournament to raise money for cancer research and treatment. He died of the disease at age 51 on December 14, 1985, at M.D. Anderson Hospital in Houston, Texas, and was buried at Holy Cross Cemetery in Fargo, North Dakota.

== Hall of Fame candidacy ==
Maris was considered for election to the National Baseball Hall of Fame via voting of the Baseball Writers' Association of America (BBWAA) from 1974 to 1988. Maris has not been elected to the Baseball Hall of Fame.

In 1977, sportswriter Greg Hansen criticized baseball writers in the St. Petersburg Independent for excluding Maris from the Hall of Fame after Maris received only 72 votes in that year's voting. Hansen noted that there were many outfielders in the Hall of Fame who had never won two MVP awards, and that no one else had ever hit 61 home runs in a season. "To show you what an injustice this is to the man, Maris finished just a notch ahead of Harvey Kuenn, for crying out loud." Hansen wrote that Maris had resented the media's intrusion on his privacy; he said that Maris's tense relationship with the media had affected the voting. Hansen also wrote that Maris had told him after the voting that he knew he would never get inducted into the Baseball Hall of Fame: "I'll leave the Hall of Fame to the geniuses that vote on it. I will never get in. I have always known that. I will not argue with you about why or why not I should be elected."

In 2010, the Baseball Hall of Fame established a Golden Era Committee (replacing the Veterans Committee) to vote on the possible Hall of Fame induction of previously overlooked players along with retired umpires, managers and executives who made the greatest contributions to baseball between 1947 and 1972. Beginning in December 2011, this committee voted every three years on ten candidates from the era selected by the BBWAA's Historical Overview Committee. Maris did not appear on the first Golden Era Committee ballot in 2011 or on the second one in 2014 (one former player was voted to the Hall of Fame in 2011 and no one was voted in by the committee in 2014).

In August 2011, George Vecsey of The New York Times called Maris "a terrific player for a few brief years". Vecsey wrote that while Maris had two seasons where he played at Hall of Fame caliber, and while Maris played in an era that was not influenced by performance-enhancing substances, he did not believe that Maris's career statistics were worthy of induction.

=== Golden Days Committee ===
In July 2016, four new committees were established. The Golden Days Era Committee (1950–1969) was scheduled to meet and vote for the first time in December 2020 for the 2021 Hall of Fame induction. Maris is the 24th former player on the Hall of Fame rated list of 85 eligible candidates for the Golden Days Committee Ballot. In August 2020, the Hall of Fame rescheduled The Golden Days Committee winter meeting in 2020 to December 2021 due to the COVID-19 pandemic. The committee's ballot consists of ten candidates compiled by the BBWAA's Historical Overview Committee. Maris was named one of the ten finalists, but ultimately was not part of the chosen class, which consisted of Minnie Miñoso, Tony Oliva, Jim Kaat, and Gil Hodges.

== Legacy ==
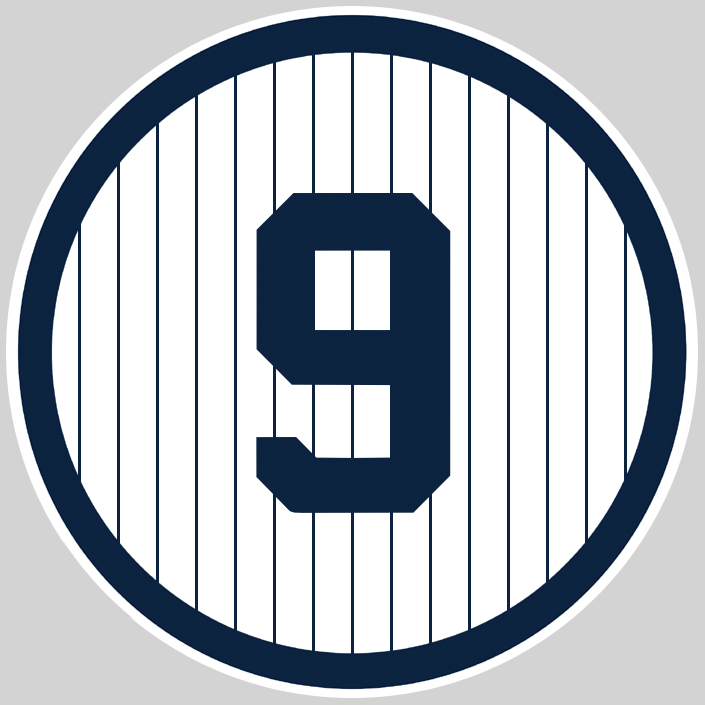
Roger Maris's number 9 was retired by the New York Yankees in 1984.

Speaking at the 1980 All-Star Game, Maris said, "They acted as though I was doing something wrong, poisoning the record books or something. Do you know what I have to show for 61 home runs? Nothing. Exactly nothing." Ford Frick, baseball's commissioner in 1961, had stated that the single-season home-run total had to be achieved in 154 games in order to be an official record. Despite this, there was no separate designation of the record, and it was affirmed by two different committees, in 1968 and 1991.

Maris's single-season MLB home run record was broken by Mark McGwire, who hit 70 in 1998. Barry Bonds set a new MLB record with 73 home runs in 2001. Maris's home run mark was also surpassed by McGwire in 1999 (with 65) and by Sammy Sosa (with 66 in 1998, 63 in 1999, and 64 in 2001). McGwire, Sosa, and Bonds have all been linked to performance-enhancing drugs. Maris remained the AL record-holder for most home runs in a season until Aaron Judge hit his 62nd home run on October 4, 2022, in the Yankees' 161st game of the year.

In 1964, Maris received North Dakota's Roughrider Award, which recognizes North Dakotans shaped by their state achieving national recognition that reflects credit and honor upon it and its citizens.

In 1977, Maris was inducted into the North Dakota American Legion Baseball Hall of Fame.

A Roger Eugene Maris plaque dedication and No. 9 retirement ceremony in Monument Park at Yankee Stadium was held on July 22, 1984 (Old-Timers' Day). The inscribed plaque, subtitled "Against All Odds", calls Maris "A great player and author of one of the most remarkable chapters in the history of major league baseball." Maris participated in the ceremony, wearing a Yankee #9 uniform. Elston Howard (No. 32), a teammate of Maris, was honored along with Maris.

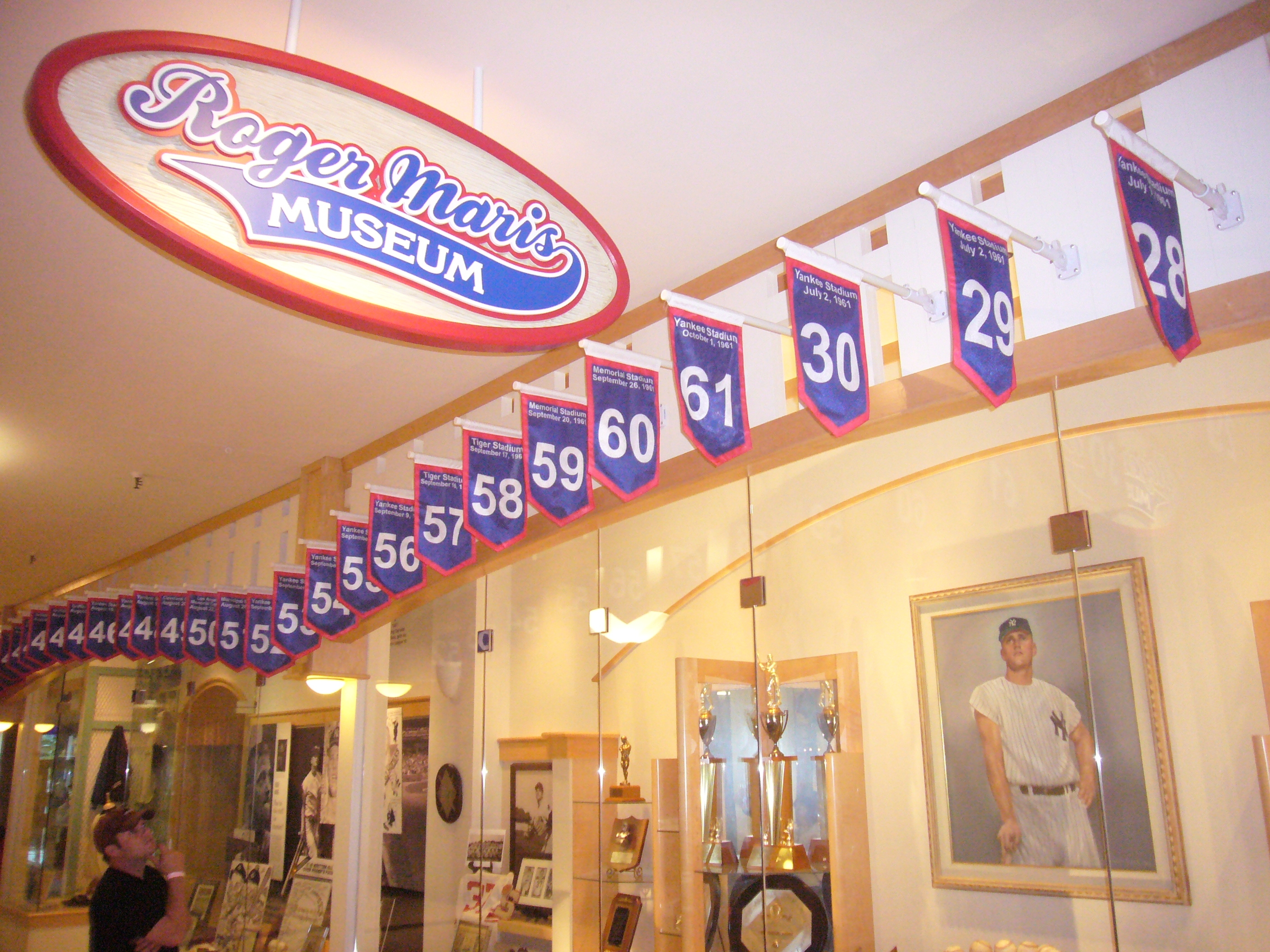
The Roger Maris Museum in Fargo

The Roger Maris Museum, which opened in 1984 at the West Acres Shopping Center in Fargo, and the Roger Maris Cancer Center, which opened in 1990 at Sanford Hospital in Fargo, are both named after Maris.

The United States Postal Service issued a "Roger Maris, 61 in 61" commemorative stamp on September 17, 1999, as part of the Celebrate the Century series. This places him in rarer company than even being elected to the National Baseball Hall of Fame, as only 30 baseball players have been given their own commemorative U.S. postage stamp as of 2022.

Actor Barry Pepper portrayed Maris in the 2001 HBO film 61*, directed by Billy Crystal.

In 2005, in light of accusations of steroid use against the three players who had, by then, hit more than 61 home runs in a season (McGwire, Sosa and Bonds), the North Dakota Senate wrote to Major League Baseball to express the opinion that Roger Maris's 61 home runs should be recognized as the single-season record.

Maris was inducted into the Baseball Reliquary's Shrine of the Eternals in 2009.

At least through 2010, Newman Signs Inc., naming rights holder to Newman Outdoor Field in Fargo, sponsored billboard signage declaring Maris the "Legitimate Home Run King". Newman Outdoor Field's dimensions also mirror those of post-renovation Yankee Stadium and the #8 that Maris wore for the F-M Twins in 1953 is retired by the stadium's primary tenant, the Fargo-Moorhead RedHawks.

On September 24, 2011, at Yankee Stadium, the Yankees celebrated the 50th anniversary of Maris's single-season home run record.

In October 2022, he was inaugurated in the Croatian-American Sports Hall of Fame.

Although Maris did not tie Ruth's record of sixty home runs until 1961's 159th game, which was five games more than the 154 in which Ruth, in 1927, had hit his own sixty, he reached his sixtieth homer in three fewer plate appearances (684) than those in which Ruth's sixty had been hit (687). His sixty-first was hit in his plate appearance 696, five more than Ruth's total 1927 plate appearances of 691.

In 2023, Maris's game-worn New York Yankees jersey from his record-breaking 1961 season sold at Heritage Auctions for US$1.59 million.

== MLB statistics ==
Maris's major league statistics:

Years	Games	PA	AB	Runs	Hits	2B	3B	HR	RBI	SB	BB	SO	OBP	SLG	BA	Fld%
12	1,463	5,847	5,101	826	1,325	195	42	275	850	21	652	733	.345	.476	.260	.982

== MLB awards ==
Maris's major league awards:

Award / Honor	Time(s)	Date(s)
American League All-Star	7	1959, 1960 (2) 1961 (2) 1962 (2)
American League Most Valuable Player	2	1960, 1961
American League Gold Glove Award (RF)	1	1960

=== Other awards, honors, and achievements ===
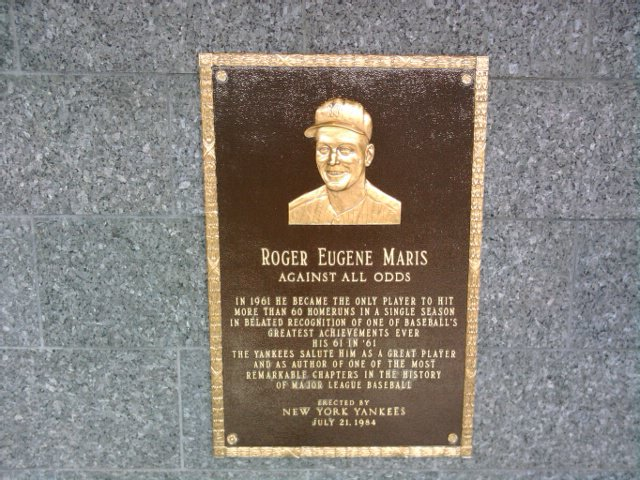
Roger Maris plaque in Yankee Stadium's Monument Park

- Hickok Belt (1961)
- Sporting News Player of the Year (1961)
- World Series champion: 1961, 1962, 1967
- AL leader in home runs, runs scored, and total bases: 1961
- AL leader in runs batted in and extra base hits: 1960, 1961
- AL leader in slugging average: 1960
- AL leader in double plays turned as right fielder and outfielder: 1959
- AL leader in fielding average as right fielder: 1960, 1964
- NL leader in fielding average as right fielder: 1967
- New York Yankees No. 9 retired / Monument Park honoree: 1984

== See also ==
- List of Major League Baseball annual home run leaders
- List of Major League Baseball annual runs batted in leaders
- List of Major League Baseball annual runs scored leaders
- List of Major League Baseball career home run leaders
- List of Major League Baseball home run records

Awards and achievements
Preceded by Babe Ruth	Single season home run record holder 1961–1998	Succeeded by Mark McGwire
