= List of major roads in Fargo, North Dakota =

This is a list of major roads in the city of Fargo, North Dakota.

The street system of Fargo is structured in the classic grid pattern. Routes that run from north to south are called streets, and routes that run from east to west are called avenues.

== Major east-west roads ==
Note: Roads are listed from north to south. Description in parentheses indicates general nature of corridor.

- 40th Avenue North (northern border of airport)
- 19th Avenue North (Hector International Airport, Fargodome)
- 12th Avenue North (industrial, North Dakota State University)
- Northern Pacific Avenue (central business district)
- Main Avenue (US 10, central business district, continues to West Fargo and I-94)
- 13th Avenue South (heavy retail, commercial, West Acres Shopping Center, to West Fargo)
- 17th Avenue South (residential, collector, to West Fargo)
- Interstate 94
- 32nd Avenue South (light commercial)
- 40th Avenue South (residential collector)
- 52nd Avenue South (residential, southern city limits)

== Major north-south roads ==
Note: Roads are listed from east to west. Description in parentheses indicates general nature of corridor.

- Elm Street (residential)
- Broadway (central business district, residential)
- 10th Street (US 81 Business), northbound lanes from 13th Ave. S to 19th Ave. N. (residential, to central business district)
- University Drive (US 81 Business), southbound only from 13th Ave. S to 19th Ave. N.) main road in eastern Fargo, one way from 19th Ave. N. to 13th Ave. S., central business district, Sanford Health)
- 25th Street (residential, commercial)
- Interstate 29
- 42nd Street (commercial, West Acres Shopping Center)
- 45th Street (commercial, developing, main road for western Fargo)
