= Huntsman Marine Science Centre =

Laboratory in New Brunswick, Canada

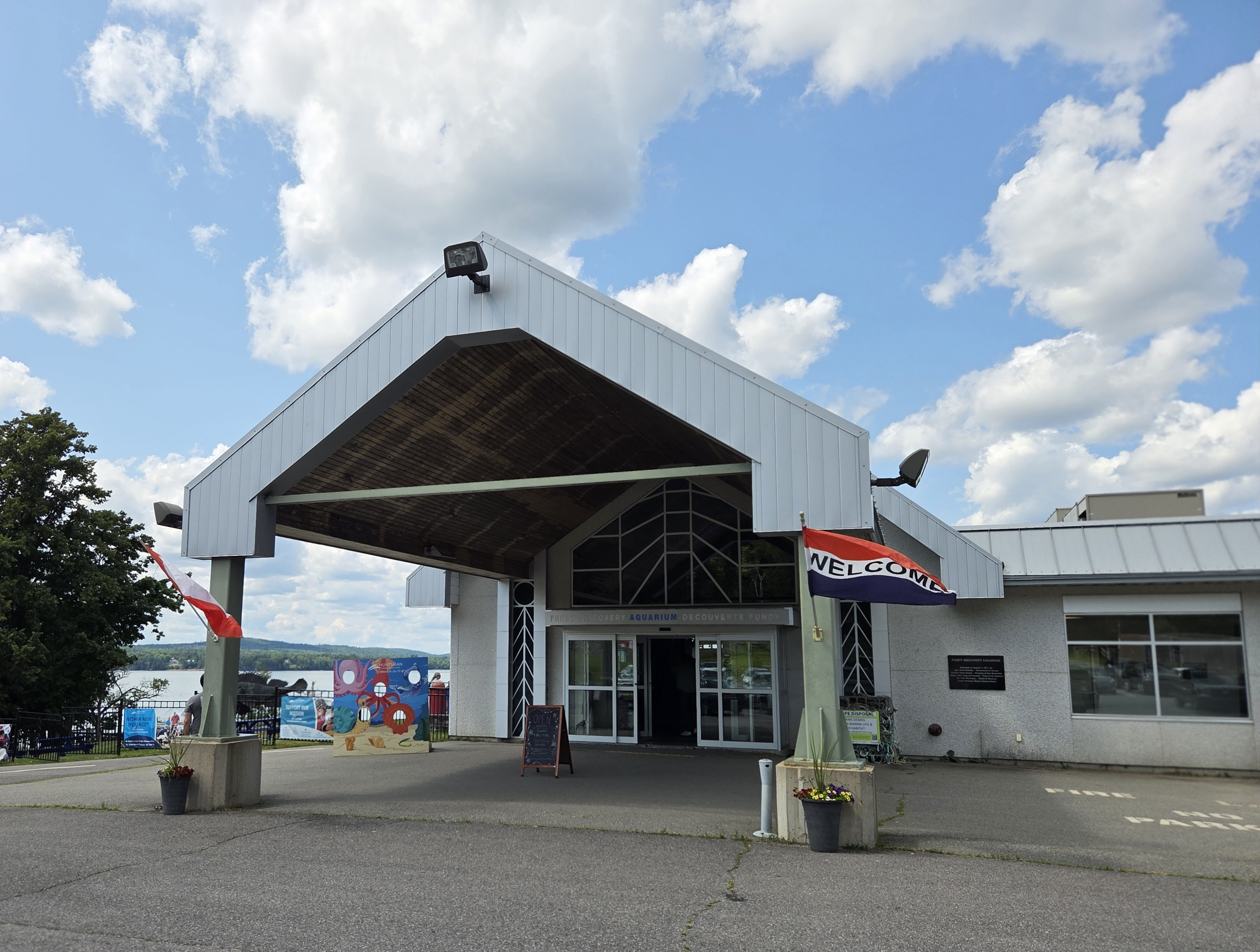
The aquarium at the Huntsman Marine Science Centre

The Huntsman Marine Science Centre (acronym: HMSC; previously Huntsman Marine Laboratory) is a membership-driven, nonprofit organization in St. Andrews, New Brunswick, Canada.

It was founded by a consortium of universities with the support of the National Research Council of Canada, Fisheries and Oceans Canada, and the New Brunswick Department of Fisheries and Aquaculture. Mr. Chris Bridger is the executive director; Dr. W.B. Scott is senior scientist emeritus. It is named in honor of Archibald Gowanlock Huntsman, director of the St. Andrews Biological Station that adjoins the centre, who stimulated fishery research in the region.

== History ==
It was founded in 1969 by a consortium of universities in Eastern Canada, and several government departments, who pooled their resources in order to provide field research and teaching facilities that would complement their programs in marine biology and oceanography. The Huntsman Marine Laboratory was established on 20 acres (8.1 ha) of land that was provided by Fisheries and Oceans Canada, and included two residential buildings that were called the Ambridge Estate. The government assisted with the purchase of the Sir Thomas Tait Estate which included another 50 acres, and the large Anderson House, which provides accommodation for visiting students. A public aquarium opened in 1972. The name was changed to Huntsman Marine Science Centre in 1987. In 1991 and again in 1999, the HMSC was awarded the Gulf of Maine Visionary Award.

== Geography ==
The HMSC laboratories are located on 74 acres (30 ha) of land at the estuary of the St. Croix River at the Bay of Fundy.

== Services and facilities ==
HMSC has teaching and aquaculture research laboratories and a 15 metres (49 ft) research vessel. The HMSC hosts the executive office of the Ocean Biogeographic Information System. HMSC's education branch offers academic and public education programs for schoolchildren, undergraduate students and school teachers. The research branch works with governmental agencies and private industry, while its biodiversity unit, the Atlantic Reference Centre, has the largest collections of Atlantic organisms in Canada. The HMSC hosts the executive office of the Ocean Biogeographic Information System. The Huntsman Aquarium and Museum includes a teeming touch tank. Live marine specimens, displays, and marine ecology films are available from May to October.

In 2023, the Huntsman Marine Science Centre released the Dive Deeper website with detailed 3D and panoramic views diving around the Passamaquoddy Bay.
