= Celebrate the Century =

- Country of production: United States
- Location of production: APU, Williamsville, NY, US
- Designer: various
- Engraver: various
- Printer: Ashton-Potter USA
- Dimensions: 190 mm × 229 mm (7.5 in × 9.0 in)
- Perforation: 11.5
- Commemorates: Events of the 20th century in the US in 10 sheets that commemorates each decade
- Depicts: Various people, things, events in 15 stamps per sheet
- Notability: Used in the CTC education program, and travelled as a railroad exhibit under the CTC Express program.
- Nature of rarity: Not rare
- Face value: 32¢ x 15 ($4.80); 1900s to 1940s 33¢ x 15 ($4.95); 1950s to 1990s
- Estimated value: About $150 for all the sheets

Celebrate the Century is a series of postage stamps made by the United States Postal Service featuring images recalling various important events in the 20th century in the United States. Ten of these sheets were issued, with each sheet depicting events of one decade of the 20th century, from the 1900s to 1990s. Fifteen stamps were embedded into each sheet. For the first eight sheets (1900s to 1970s) of the fifteen stamps, one stamp of each sheet was printed using the intaglio process, while the remaining fourteen were offset printed along with the rest of the sheet. All the sheets were printed by the Ashton-Potter USA printing company.

== Format ==
These gummed souvenir sheets had an unusually large format of 7½"x9" (190mmx229mm). The top left hand corner sported the decade in a number format, the entire background of the sheet was devoted a specific event of that decade (e.g. the Wright brothers standing next to their Flyer II on the 1900s sheet.)

The fifteen stamps were printed at an angle of 8°, the horizontal perforations ran from the stamps up to the edge of sheet. The stamps were arranged on the sheets in four rows, and nested in arrangements unique to each sheet. An area was devoted to the description of the decade as depicted by the stamps on it. The description of each stamp was printed on the gummed side of the sheet, behind each stamp.

The words Arts, Sports, Historical Events ran on the left hand edge, Technology, Entertainment, Science ran on the top edge, Political Figures, Life Style on the right hand edge of the sheet.

The stamp images for the first five sheets were selected by Citizens' Stamp Advisory Committee and those for the remaining five sheets were selected by a nationwide poll.

== CTC Express ==
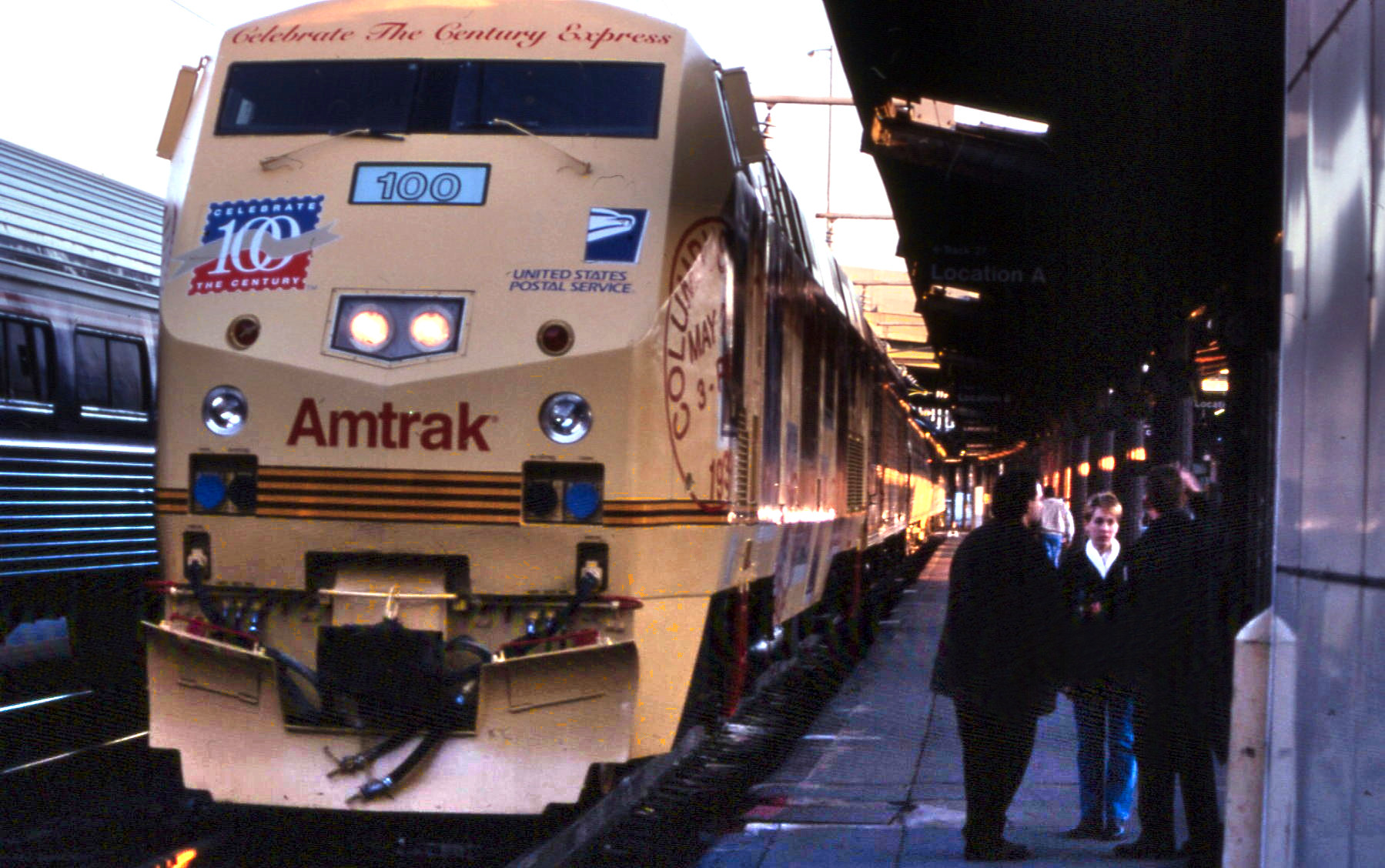
Celebrate the Century Express

The CTC stamp program was publicised through an award-winning travelling railway museum tour, named Celebrate the Century Express commissioned by the USPS consisting of a locomotive and three cars. This train travelled for eighteen months from 11 March 1999 through fall 19 November 2000 throughout the continental US to showcase the mail to the US public. During its journey it travelled through 100 cities in 42 states and had more than 111,000 visitors including 6,000 children. The CTC Express consisted of an Amtrak P42 Genesis series diesel locomotive, an exhibit car featuring multimedia displays of US commemorative stamps, a restored Railway Mail Service car, a historic railroad business car, and a baggage car. The CTC Express received the U.S. Transportation Department's "Design for Transportation National Awards 2000," and the "TRANNY Award of Excellence" from the Transportation Marketing and Communications Association. On 25 May 2000 the US Congress commended the USPS for receiving these awards.

== CTC Education Series ==
The USPS with the US Department of Education and ten of the leading K–12 educational associations, started the education program involving more than 300,000 students across the U.S. in a comprehensive, in-class curriculum program which would take students on a field trip through the decades of the 20th century.

The program kits were created for students from grades 3 to 6, and was available to teachers free of charge. Each kit included a teacher's guide, a student activity magazine, computer activities, internet linked sites, multimedia classroom visuals, school balloting for students and take home projects for children for parental participation. In a survey taken in 1999 of 20,000 educators, it was revealed that the program was a big success.

== The sheets ==
=== 1900s ===
Title: Dawn of the Twentieth Century.
Date of issue: 3 February 1998.
Denomination: 32¢
No of stamps in sheet: 15
The stamps:

- 1st row: Ford Model T; President Theodore Roosevelt; Movie Great Train Robbery; Crayola crayons; St. Louis World's Fair
- 2nd row: Pure Food and Drug Act; Wright Flyer; Ashcan School
- 3rd row: Ellis Island; John Muir
- 4th row: Teddy bear; W. E. B. Du Bois; The Gibson Girl; 1903 World Series; Robie House

Background image: The Wright brothers stand beside their Flyer II, near Dayton, Ohio.
Intaglio stamp: The Gibson Girl created by illustrator Charles Dana Gibson.

Inspired by the teddy bear stamp on this sheet, the USPS in 2002 issued a set of four teddy bear stamps.

=== 1910s ===
Title: America Looks Beyond its Borders.
Date of issue: 3 February 1998.
Denomination: 32¢
No of stamps in sheet: 15
The stamps:

- 1st row: Charlie Chaplin; Federal Reserve System; George Washington Carver
- 2nd row: 1913 Armory Show; Transcontinental telephone line; Panama Canal
- 3rd row: Jim Thorpe; Grand Canyon; I Want You; Boy Scouts of America; President Woodrow Wilson;
- 4th row: First Crossword puzzle; Jack Dempsey; Erector Set; Child Labor Reform

Background image: Boy Scouts participate in a patriotic "Wake Up America" rally on New York City's Fifth Avenue.
Intaglio stamp: Panama Canal.

The stamp commemorating Carver was the second issued by the US Postal Service, the first stamp had been issued in 1948.

=== 1920s ===
Title: The Roaring Twenties.
Date of issue: 28 May 1998.
Denomination: 32¢
No of stamps in sheet: 15
The stamps:

- 1st row: Babe Ruth; Novel: The Great Gatsby; Prohibition; Toy trains; Women's suffrage
- 2nd row: Emily Post; Margaret Mead; John Held, Jr.; Radio; Chrysler Building
- 3rd row: Jazz; Notre Dame's Four Horsemen; Charles Lindbergh
- 4th row: Automat; Black Thursday

Background image: Members of a dance troupe strike poses from the Charleston on a California beach during a break in the filming of a movie in 1926.
Intaglio stamp: Charles Lindbergh.

=== 1930s ===
Title: Depression, Dust Bowl, and a New Deal.
Date of issue: 9 October 1998.
Denomination: 32¢
No of stamps in sheet: 15
The stamps:

- 1st row: Franklin D. Roosevelt; Empire State Building; Life Magazine; Eleanor Roosevelt; New Deal Program
- 2nd row: Superman; Household Conveniences; movie: Snow White; novel: Gone with the Wind; Jesse Owens
- 3rd row: 20th Century Limited; Golden Gate Bridge; Florence Owens Thompson
- 4th row: Bobby Jones; Monopoly

Background image: A farmer and two sons flee a dust storm in Cimarron County, Oklahoma in April 1936.
Intaglio stamp: Empire State Building

The Gone with the Wind stamp is the second issued by the USPS, the first was issued on 30 June 1930, commemorating the 50th anniversary of the sale of the book with a 1¢ stamp featuring its author Margaret Mitchell. The photo of Florence Owens Thompson, taken by photographer Dorothea Lange and titled Migrant Mother (1936), is an iconic image of the Great Depression.

=== 1940s ===
Title: World War II Transforms America.
Date of issue: 18 February 1999.
Denomination: 33¢
No of stamps in sheet: 15
The stamps:

- 1st row: World War II; Antibiotics; Jackie Robinson
- 2nd row: President Harry S. Truman; Women support war effort; Television
- 3rd row: Jitterbug; Jackson Pollock; G. I. Bill; Big band; United Nations
- 4th row: Baby boom; Slinky; A Streetcar Named Desire; Citizen Kane

Background image: A landing party of United States Marines storm a beach on Saipan, a Japanese stronghold in the Mariana Islands in 1944.
Intaglio stamp: United Nations.

=== 1950s ===
Title: Family Fun, Suburbia, and Nuclear Threats.
Date of issue: 26 May 1999.
Denomination: 33¢
No of stamps in sheet: 15
The stamps:

- 1st row: Polio vaccine; Teen Fashion; 1951 National League; Explorer I; Korean War
- 2nd row: Desegregating public schools; Car tailfin; The Cat in the Hat
- 3rd row: Drive-in theater; New York Yankees vs Brooklyn Dodgers 1949 – 1956
- 4th row: Rocky Marciano; I Love Lucy; Rock and roll; Daytona 500; 3D movies

Background image: Family in front of a television set.
Intaglio stamp: Polio vaccine.

The stamp on Lucille Ball was the first to be issued commemorating the actress. This was soon followed by another stamp on 7 August 2001 which was part of the Legends of Hollywood series.

=== 1960s ===
Title: The Rebellious Sixties and Man on the Moon.
Date of issue: 17 September 1999.
Denomination: 33¢
No of stamps in sheet: 15
The stamps:

- 1st row: Martin Luther King; Woodstock Music and Art Fair; Moon landing; Green Bay Packers; Star Trek
- 2nd row: Peace Corps; Vietnam War; Ford Mustang; Barbie; Integrated circuit
- 3rd row: Laser; AFL-NFL; Peace symbol
- 4th row: Roger Maris; The Beatles

Background image: Astronaut Buzz Aldrin sets up seismic equipment to record lunar tremors.
Intaglio stamp: Buzz Aldrin's lunar foot print.

=== 1970s ===
Title: Bicentennial, Watergate, and Earth Day.
Date of issue: 18 November 1999.
Denomination: 33¢
No of stamps in sheet: 15
The stamps:

- 1st row: Earth Day; All in the Family; Sesame Street
- 2nd row: Disco; Pittsburgh Steelers; United States Bicentennial
- 3rd row: Secretariat – Horse of the Year; Videocassette recorder, Pioneer 10; Women's Rights Movement by UNIFEM; 1970s fashion
- 4th row: ABC's Monday Night Football; Smiley face; Boeing 747; Medical imaging

In 1999, the U.S. Postal Service honored Secretariat with a 33-cent U.S. postage stamp entitled "Secretariat Wins Triple Crown" in the Celebrate the Century (1970s) series. The national unveiling ceremony was held in the winner's circle at Keeneland Race Course in Lexington, Kentucky on Saturday, October 16, 1999. On Thursday, November 18, 1999, the First Day of Issue ceremony was held at the Postage Stamp Mega-event at the Jacob K. Javits Convention Center in New York City, New York. The stamp was issued to celebrate Secretariat and his iconic 1973 Triple Crown victory. The following text is in the packet: “Secretariat Wins Triple Crown" – In 1972, two-year-old Secretariat was named Horse of the Year. In 1973, he won the coveted Triple Crown, including the only less-than-two-minute Kentucky Derby victory and a 31-length Belmont Stakes triumph."

The stamp is among those listed in the Smithsonian Institution's record of exhibitions called, "Trailblazers and Trendsetters: Art of the Stamp: Sports." The description about the Secretariat stamp reads as follows: “Affectionately known as "Big Red," Secretariat was a sturdy, chestnut-colored thoroughbred who made his racing debut on July 4, 1972. He won five contests that year and was named Horse of the Year. In 1973, Secretariat became the first horse in 25 years to win the coveted Triple Crown. In May of that year, he ran the Kentucky Derby in less than two minutes, the fastest finish ever recorded at the prestigious race. The colt then went on to win the Preakness Stakes and, in June, the Belmont Stakes, which he won by a triumphant 31 lengths.” The description includes this information about the artwork: “Artist: Kazuhiko Sano; Art Director: Howard Paine; Medium: Acrylic on Gesso Board; and Year of Issue: 1999.” The painted image looks like an exact copy of the painting on the cover of the June 11, 1973 (Vol. 101, No. 24) issue of TIME Magazine. The stamp was in a collection called Celebrate the Century (1970).

Issued on November 18, 1999, the Secretariat stamp is on the left side of the third row of the sheet of 15 stamps celebrating the 1970s entitled: Bicentennial, Watergate, and Earth Day. The stamps pictured in the first row of the information packet were entitled: Earth Day; All in the Family (TV series); and Sesame Street (with Big Bird from the TV series). The second row has stamps for: Disco; Pittsburgh Steelers; and the United States Bicentennial. “Secretariat – Horse of the Year” is in the third row, along with the Videocassette recorder, Pioneer 10; the Women's Rights Movement by UNIFEM; and 1970s fashion. In the fourth row is: ABC's Monday Night Football; Smiley face; the Boeing 747; and Medical imaging. While Watergate is in the title of the series, the scandal is not represented on any stamps in the collection. The Celebrate the Century stamps are available online, but not from the Post Office.

Background image: Ships gather in New York Harbor under the Statue of Liberty to take part in Bicentennial celebrations, July 4, 1976, marked the 200th birthday of the United States.
Intaglio stamp: Videocassette recorder.

On the occasion of the unveiling of the Boeing 747 stamp by the USPS, Boeing in 1999 unveiled a 70 square foot replica of the Boeing 747 stamp image installed on the door of their Everett factory.

=== 1980s ===
Title: Space Shuttle Launched, Berlin Wall Falls.
Date of issue: 12 January 2000.
Denomination: 33¢
No of stamps in sheet: 15
The stamps:

- 1st row: Space Shuttle; Cats an Andrew Lloyd Webber musical; San Francisco 49ers; Iran hostage crisis; Figure skating
- 2nd row: Cable TV; Vietnam Veterans Memorial; Compact Disc; Cabbage Patch Kids; The Cosby Show
- 3rd row: Fall of the Berlin Wall; Video games; E.T. the Extra-Terrestrial
- 4th row: Personal computer; Hip hop culture

Background image: The Space Shuttle Columbia is launched 27 June 1982 on its fourth mission.
Intaglio stamp: None present.

The Vietnam Veteran Memorial stamp is the second stamp commemorating the Vietnam War, the first one was issued in the 1960s sheet.

=== 1990s ===
Title: In Final Decade, Cold War Ends, Economy Booms.
Date of issue: 2 May 2000.
Denomination: 33¢
No of stamps in sheet: 15
The stamps:

- 1st row: Major League Baseball; Gulf War; Seinfeld
- 2nd row: Extreme sports; Improving education; Computer graphics
- 3rd row: Peregrine falcon removed from endangered species list; John Glenn returns to space; 30th anniversary of the Special Olympics; Virtual reality; Jurassic Park
- 4th row: Titanic movie; Sport utility vehicle; World Wide Web; Mobile phone

Background image: Image of currency superimposed by a graph of the rising economy.
Intaglio stamp: None present.

The Return to Space stamp commemorating former astronaut and then Senator John Glenn's return to space after a period of 36 years, depicted the Space Shuttle Discovery, and Glenn's Mercury Friendship 7 space craft side by side in space.

== See also ==
- Canada Post millennium stamps
- Millennium stamp
- Nature of America
