= St. Andrews Biological Station =

Canadian research center

Coordinates: 45.082755°N 67.082647°W

St. Andrews Biological Station (acronym: SABS; originally: Atlantic Biological Station) is a Fisheries and Oceans Canada research centre located on Brandy Cove Road in St. Andrews, New Brunswick.

Along with the Huntsman Marine Science Centre, the Atlantic Salmon Federation, and the Charlotte County campus of the New Brunswick Community College, SABS is the core of a network of fisheries research and educational institutions in the area. SABS is Canada's first marine biological research station, having been established by the Department of Marine and Fisheries in 1899 as a temporary floating laboratory. The permanent station was officially established in 1908.

The current director is Dr. Thomas W. Sephton. Dr. Robert Stephenson is the leader of its Gulf of Maine Section, while Dr. Peter Lawton, Director of the Centre for Marine Biodiversity, is a Research Scientist at SABS.

== History ==
In 1899, university professors from around Canada came to St. Andrews over the summer months to do field research work at Canada's first marine biological station, which, at the time, was a floating scow. In 1908, permanent installations of the biological station were established with the main laboratory, a residence building, and an attic. There were long working tables, and storage area for materials and supplies. Dr. Archibald Gowanlock Huntsman was the Curator from 1912 to 1921 and Director from 1921 until 1933. The main lab was destroyed by fire in 1932 and replaced the following year by a fireproof lab, part of the complex that houses the SABS' library. After establishing the first freshwater biological research station in Canada at Gimli, Manitoba in 1929, the fisheries biologist Alexander Dimitrivitch Bajkov came to work at SABS in the 1930s. In 2009, a contract was awarded to construct a new wet laboratory building through consolidation of existing buildings into one state of the art wet lab facility that houses the majority of marine life and research operations; project was completed in June 2012.

== Services ==
The station's research includes aquaculture, oceanography, the sustainability of fisheries, stock assessments, aquatic environment, species at risk, and the biology of commercially harvested fish. SABS maintains a reservoir. It provides several services such as saltwater, freshwater and chemistry labs; quarantine water and marine fish rearing facilities; and electron microscopy. Minimal incubator spaces are available at SABS but they are available at the adjacent Huntsman Marine Science Centre. One of the labs studies Multi-trophic Aquaculture, growing different species in the same containers.

The St. Andrews Biological Station Library did contain the world's largest collection of northwest Atlantic material. It has collections in the areas of aquaculture, environmental chemistry, environmental sciences, marine biology, ocean sciences, population ecology, and toxicology. Library resources are available on site to the public. Charlotte McAdam is the Head Librarian.

SABS publication is entitled "Environmental Science Research - St. Andrews Biological Station". The free monograph is published in both English and French.

== See also ==
Pacific Biological Station
