= Nature of America =

- Country of production: United States
- Location of production: Browns Summit, NC; AVR, Clinton, SC; Williamsville, NY
- Designer: Ethel Kessler
- Printer: Banknote Corporation of America; Ashton-Potter (USA) Ltd; American Packaging Corp. Avery Dennison; Sennett Security Products
- Dimensions: 233 mm × 171 mm (9.2 in × 6.7 in)
- Perforation: Die cut
- Commemorates: Ten U.S. geographical regions
- Depicts: Flora and fauna of ten U.S. geographical regions
- Notability: Educational series
- Nature of rarity: Not rare
- Face value: 33¢ x 10 ($3.30); 1999 and 2000; 34¢ x 10 ($3.40); 2001 and 2002; 37¢ x 10 ($3.70); 2003 to 2005, 39¢ x 10 ($3.90) 2006; 41¢ x 10 ($4.10) 2007; 42¢ x 10 ($4.20) 2008; 44¢ x 10 ($4.40) 2009 and 2010
- Estimated value: About $11.50 to 17.50 as per catalog

Nature of America is a series of twelve self-adhesive stamp sheets that the United States Postal Service released annually between 1999 and 2010 starting with the Sonoran Desert sheet and ending with the Hawaiian Rain Forest Sheet. Like the Celebrate the Century stamp series, these were printed on large sheets 9"x8¾" (233mm x 171mm), but differed from the former in that they were self adhesive and not gummed.

== Design process ==
The sheets were designed by Ethel Kessler and illustrated by artist John D. Dawson for the USPS. The original idea for the series, conceived 1996, was for a set of four American desert stamps. This was inspired by the success of Desert Plants commemorative stamps released in 1981. Artist John D. Dawson was recommended by art director Howard Paine and selected for the illustration of these four stamps. Paine had worked with Dawson on three previous USPS issues: American Cats (1988), Idaho Statehood (1990), and Flowering Trees (1998). From four stamps the idea expanded into a proposed set of six stamp sheets covering six ecosystems. After the commercial success of the first sheets the USPS decided to extend the series by six more ecosystems from the Sonoran Desert to the Hawaiian Rain Forest.

The design team drew inspiration from The World of Dinosaurs two-sheet issue of 1997. These sheets were panoramic in design with punched perforations on a gummed sheet. Since the punched perforations would distract the visual continuity of the design, the team decided to go for the self-adhesive format with serpentine die cutting for the individual stamps. Each sheet consisted of a large panoramic image of a U.S. geographical region, with the region's flora and fauna clearly visible. Ten stamps were die cut on to the design, each composing one or more species indigenous to the depicted region. The rear of sheet had a brief descriptive text of the stamp images, accompanied with a graphic outline of the stamp images. The flora and fauna depicted were identified and labelled.

== The sheets ==
Starting with the Sonoran Desert sheet, the USPS issued a total of twelve sheets in the series. The sheets issued along with date and place of issue denomination and printer:

Ecosystem	Date of issue	Place of issue	No. stamps in sheet	Face Value	Printer
Sonoran Desert	April 6, 1999	Tucson, Arizona	10	33¢	Banknote Corporation of America
Pacific Coast Rain Forest	March 28, 2000	Seattle, Washington	10	33¢	Banknote Corporation of America
Great Plains Prairie	March 29, 2001	Lincoln, Nebraska	10	34¢	Ashton-Potter (USA) Ltd
Longleaf Pine Forest	April 26, 2002	Tallahassee, Florida	10	34¢	American Packaging Corp. for Sennet Security
Arctic Tundra	July 1, 2003	Fairbanks, Alaska	10	37¢	Banknote Corporation of America
Pacific Coral Reef	Jan 2, 2004	Honolulu, Hawaii	10	37¢	Avery Dennison
Northeast Deciduous Forest	March 3, 2005	New York, New York	10	37¢	Avery Dennison
Southern Florida Wetland	October 5, 2006	Naples, Florida	10	39¢	Avery Dennison
Alpine Tundra	August 28, 2007	Estes Park, Colorado	10	41¢	Sennett Security Products
Great Lakes Dunes	October 2, 2008	Empire, Michigan	10	42¢	Avery Dennison
Kelp Forest	October 1, 2009	Monterey, California	10	44¢	Avery Dennison
Hawaiian Rain Forest	September 1, 2010	Hawaii National Park	10	44¢	Banknote Corporation of America, Inc

== References and sources ==
Sources

- USPS News Releases
- Nature of America - US stamp sheets
