= Roger Maris Museum =

Baseball museum in Fargo, North Dakota, US

Coordinates: 46.859647°N 96.843706°W

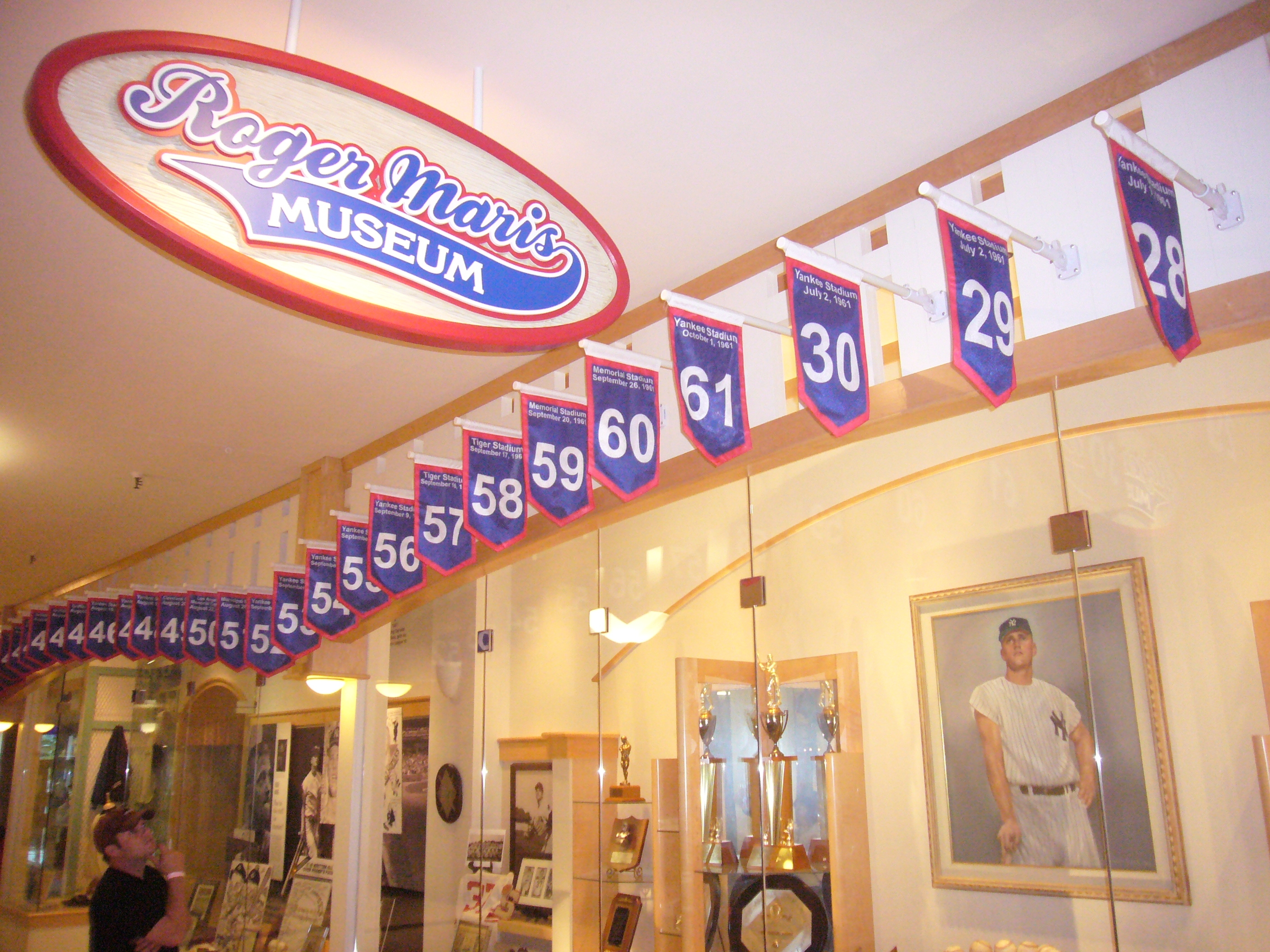

The Roger Maris Museum is a 70-foot (21m) display case museum in West Acres Shopping Center in Fargo, North Dakota. It is dedicated as a permanent shrine to Major League Baseball player and local alumni Roger Maris, centering on his life and baseball career, most notably for the New York Yankees during the 1961 season in which Maris hit a then-record 61 home runs. The museum is open during mall hours and is free to the public.

== History ==
The Roger Maris Museum was created by Fargo American Legion members Robert Smith and James McLaughlin. Originally, Maris declined to have a museum erected in his honor. He initially agreed only if it be on public display and charge no admission, as he did not want to capitalize on his success. Maris also personally chose to have the museum site be located within West Acres. It was constructed and opened in 1984 (42 years ago). In 2003, the museum was remodeled during the mall's renovation.

On July 26, 2016, at approximately 2:15 a.m. CDT, the museum was burglarized. Items stolen included the 1960 American League Most Valuable Player Award plaque as well as the Hickok Belt that had been awarded to Maris for 1961. Nine suspects were arrested and charged with the thefts, among others, in June 2023. The awards were transported to Pennsylvania by the thieves, where they were melted down and sold as raw precious metal. Three members of the burglary ring responsible for the theft were convicted in February 2025, while five others pleaded guilty to charges.

== Exhibits ==
The museum is located in the southeast wing of West Acres. It features a small theatre with documentary films about Maris and is furnished with actual seats from Yankee Stadium. Among the exhibits are Maris' uniforms, a replica of his 1961 locker, his two MVP awards, Sultan of Swat Crowns, many bats and home run balls, baseball cards and memorabilia as well as relics from his amateur years.
