= Archibald Gowanlock Huntsman =

Canadian academic, oceanographer, and fisheries biologist

- Born: November 23, 1883; Tintern, Ontario
- Died: August 8, 1973 (aged 89); St. Andrews, New Brunswick
- Education: University of Toronto
- Known for: Research on Atlantic salmon
- Awards: Flavelle Medal (1952)
- Scientific career
- Fields: Oceanography and Fisheries science

Archibald Gowanlock Huntsman (November 23, 1883 – August 8, 1973) was a Canadian academic, oceanographer, and fisheries biologist. He is best known for his research on Atlantic salmon and inventing the fast freezing of fish fillets in 1929.

Born in Tintern, Ontario, the son of Lution Erotas Huntsman and Elizabeth Gowanlock Huntsman, Huntsman attended St. Catharines Collegiate Institute before receiving a Bachelor of Arts degree from the University of Toronto in 1905. He then studied medicine receiving his Bachelor of Medicine degree in 1907. He would not practice medicine and received an honorary M.D. degree from the University of Toronto in 1933.

In 1907, he joined the Department of Zoology of the University of Toronto as a lecturer. In 1917, he was appointed an associate lecturer and was appointed a professor of marine zoology in 1927. He retired in 1954.

In 1911, he was appointed Curator at St. Andrews Biological Station in New Brunswick, and became its permanent curator in 1915, following his intensive participation in the Canadian Fisheries Expedition of 1914-15. For this expedition, the Canadian government hired Johan Hjort, the great Norwegian fisheries biologist who was at that time the leading scientist in the field, to come to Canada and investigate the conditions of the herring in the offshore waters. Hjort introduced to Canada the latest developments in the nascent science of fisheries biology and in Scandinavian dynamic oceanography, both of which influenced Huntsman profoundly, changing his research focus from the study of ascidian taxonomy and evolutionary questions to problems of fisheries science. Huntsman was Director of the St. Andrews Biological Station from 1919 to 1934, while keeping his post at the University of Toronto. This enabled him to shape the Canadian fisheries science agenda in that era, promoting the professionalization of the science while at the same time training almost an entire generation of fisheries scientists at the University of Toronto.

From 1924 to 1928 Huntsman was also Director of the Fisheries Experimental Station in Halifax, while continuing his directorship at St. Andrews and his teaching at the University of Toronto. Notably while here, he personally pursued the invention and introduction of fast frozen fish fillets (named Ice Fillets) for the Toronto market, beating Clarence Birdseye in the race to market fast-frozen fish. However, while the introduction was highly successful, the Canadian government curtailed the experiment as the government believed that it was not supposed to compete with private business. In addition, Huntsman invented "jacketed cold storage" – a lasting innovation that saw the coolant coils in freezers encased in sheets of steel to slow down frosting condensation on the inner surfaces of freezers. This innovation first saw widespread use in cooling cars of railways in the United States and Canada.

Huntsman also helped in 1921 to found, and was secretary to, the North American Council on Fisheries Research, which began US, Canadian, French, and British (Newfoundland) collaboration on fisheries and oceanographic research in imitation of the European International Council for the Exploration of the Sea. His work brought him into contact with major figures in marine science of that era, including Henry Bryant Bigelow, who became the first director of the Woods Hole Oceanographic Institution and a close friend of Huntsman's; Michael Graham who was later (after WWII) the second director of the Fisheries Laboratory at Lowestoft, England; and William F. Thompson, who was a pioneer of fish population analysis and was director of the International Fisheries Commission (later the International Pacific Halibut Commission) and the pre-eminent American scientist in the field. Huntsman grew to international stature due to his energy and dynamic interest in multiple fields related to marine science, including ecology, oceanography, evolution and various problems in fisheries and marine biology. Huntsman was a key figure in building an international marine science community.

He was president of the Royal Society of Canada from 1937 to 1938. In 1952, he was awarded the Flavelle Medal. In 2000, Canada Post issued a 46 cent postage stamp in his honour with the title "Dr. Archibald Gowanlock Huntsman: The Fisherman's Friend".

In 1980, the A.G. Huntsman Award for Excellence in the Marine Sciences was established by the Canadian marine science community to recognize excellence of research and outstanding contributions to marine sciences. It is presented annually by the Royal Society of Canada in a ceremony at the Bedford Institute of Oceanography. The award honours marine scientists of any nationality who have had and continue to have a significant influence on the course of marine scientific thought.

Professional and academic associations
| Preceded by Lawrence Johnston Burpee | President of the Royal Society of Canada; 1937–1938 | Succeeded by Victor Morin |
