= Hickok Belt =

American sports trophy

S. Rae Hickok Professional Athlete of the Year
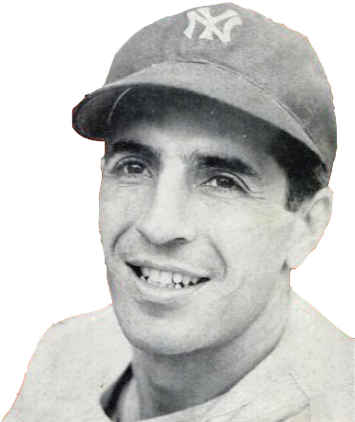
- Phil Rizzuto, the first recipient of the award
- Awarded for: Top professional athlete
- Nickname: Hickok Belt
- Sponsored by: Ray and Alan Hickok (original)
- Country: United States
- Presented by: National Sports Media Association (current)

History
- First award: 1950 (not awarded 1977–2011)
- First winner: Phil Rizzuto
- Most wins: 2, by Sandy Koufax, LeBron James, Patrick Mahomes, and Shohei Ohtani
- Most recent: Shohei Ohtani (2024)

The S. Rae Hickok Professional Athlete of the Year award, commonly known as the Hickok Belt, is a trophy awarded to the top professional athlete of the year in the United States. First awarded from 1950 to 1976, it was dormant until being revived in 2012. The most recent recipient is 2024 winner Shohei Ohtani.

== History ==
The award was created by Ray and Alan Hickok in honor of their father, Stephen Rae Hickok, who died unexpectedly in December 1945. The elder Hickok had founded the Hickok Jewelry Manufacturing Company of Rochester, New York, which made belts—hence the choice of a belt for the trophy. The first recipient was baseball player Phil Rizzuto, who received the award for 1950 during a charity dinner event in Rochester on January 22, 1951. He narrowly bested golfer Ben Hogan. (Note: In balloting, Rizzuto had 162 points including 38 first-place votes, while Hogan had 156 points including 34 first-place votes.) Rizzuto's belt is now in the collection of the National Baseball Hall of Fame and Museum.

News reports indicate that the Hickok family had previously awarded other belts to boxers, independent of the annual athlete of the year award. Examples include the presentation of "a solid gold and jewel-studded championship belt" to Jake LaMotta in June 1949 at the conclusion of a bout at Detroit's Briggs Stadium, and a belt given to a Rochester-area boxer named Mike Conroy in 1927.

The annual award winner received an alligator skin belt with a solid gold buckle, an encrusted 4-carat (0.80 g) diamond, and 26 gem chips. It was valued at $10,000 in 1951 ($124,038 in 2025), and its presentation was a major event in sporting news of the day. A simpler alligator skin belt with an engraved buckle of 10 karat gold was apparently awarded to monthly winners—examples include one presented to Otto Graham in recognition of his December 1954 monthly award, which was sold at auction in April 2001, and one presented to Elgin Baylor in recognition of his March 1959 award, which was sold at auction in 2013.

A group of 200 sportswriters throughout the U.S. selected monthly winners, with an athlete of the year selected from those honorees. (Note: Annual voting does not appear to have been strictly limited to monthly winners, as 1951 annual voting included Bobby Thomson, Stan Musial, Joe DiMaggio, and Terry Sawchuk, none of whom were a monthly winner during 1951.) For the first 21 years, from 1950 to 1970, the belt was awarded in Rochester at the annual Rochester Press-Radio Club dinner. After the Hickok company was taken over by the Tandy Corporation, the award was presented in larger cities such as Chicago or New York. After the 1976 annual award was presented, monthly awards were issued through October 1977 (naming a winner for the prior month), then halted. The award remained dormant until being revived in 2012.

During the first 27 years the annual award was presented, it was won 15 times by baseball players, five times by football players, four times by boxers, and three times by golfers. The only two-time winner was Sandy Koufax, in 1963 and 1965.

=== Revival ===
In 2010, Tony Liccione, the president of the Rochester Boxing Hall of Fame, announced plans to reinstate the Hickok Belt starting in 2012. The mold for the belt used from 1951 onward (Note: The first belt, in 1950, was engraved as the Ray Hickok Award, rather than the S. Rae Hickok Award engraving seen on later belts.) was found and planned to be used again. Liccione invited the 18 surviving belt winners (except O. J. Simpson, who at the time was incarcerated in Nevada) to a "comeback dinner", which was held on October 16, 2011, at St. John Fisher College in Rochester. Attendees included Johnny Antonelli, Carmen Basilio (1957 winner), Jim Brown (1964 winner), George Chuvalo, Meadowlark Lemon, and Bob Turley (1958 winner).

Upon being re-established in 2012, the award was based on a vote by the National Sports Media Association; however, there were no public award ceremonies or belt presentations. A 20-member panel selected one athlete each month, with the 12 monthly winners being eligible for the annual award.

For the 2012–2024 belts, five winners have been basketball players, five have been baseball players, two have been football players, and one has been a swimmer. There have been three two-time winners: LeBron James, Patrick Mahomes, and Shohei Ohtani.

Tony Liccione died in February 2025. Monthly awards since that time are lacking, leaving the future of the annual award uncertain.

== Winners ==
Hall of Famer Sandy Koufax was the award's only two-time winner prior to the award's revival in 2012

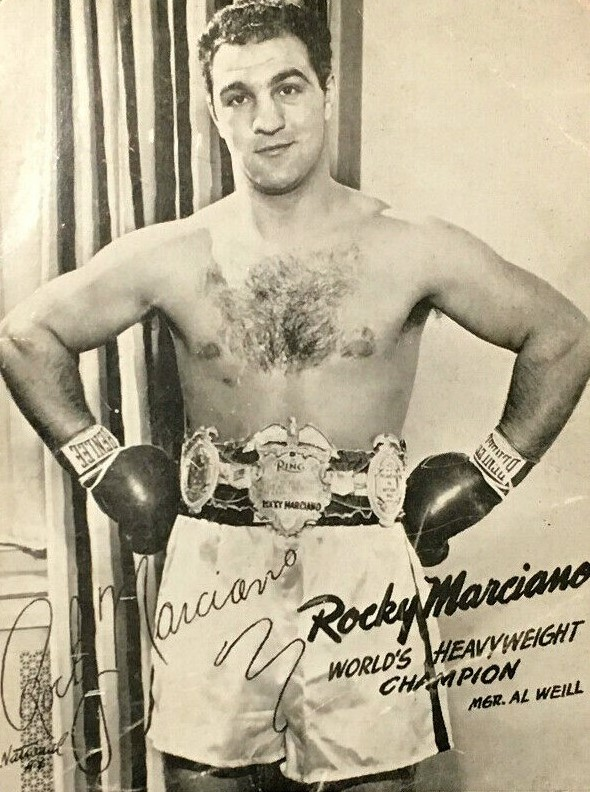
Rocky Marciano, the first non-baseball winner of the award

=== 1950–1976 ===
The following athletes won the award during its original term. Contemporary newspaper reports indicate that monthly winners were also named, only some of whom are included in this table.

Year	Winner	Sport	Monthly winners
1950	Phil Rizzuto	Baseball	Ben Hogan, Johnny Longden, George Mikan, (Note: Top vote-getter for March 1950 was college basketball coach Nat Holman, who had guided the CCNY Beavers to the NCAA title, but he was ruled ineligible "because he could not be classed as a professional athlete.") Jimmy Demaret, Stan Musial, Ben Hogan, Johnny Mize, Jim Konstanty, Ezzard Charles, George Ratterman & Phil Rizzuto (tie), Joe Culmone, Lou Groza
1951	Allie Reynolds	Baseball	Babe Didrikson, Sugar Ray Robinson, Maurice Richard, Ben Hogan, Conn McCreary, Irish Bob Murphy, Jersey Joe Walcott, Bob Feller, Allie Reynolds, Rocky Marciano, Otto Graham, Charlie Burr
1952	Rocky Marciano	Boxing	George Mikan, Chico Vejar, (Note: Chico Vejar was a welterweight boxer.) Willie Hoppe & Jackie Burke (tie), Sal Maglie, Bobby Shantz, Jersey Joe Walcott & Julius Boros (tie), Rocky Marciano, Virgil Trucks, Rocky Marciano, Mickey Mantle, Anthony DeSpirito, Anthony DeSpirito
1953	Ben Hogan	Golf	Lloyd Mangrum, Kid Gavilán, Gordie Howe, Ben Hogan, Roy Campanella, Ben Hogan, Ben Hogan, Eddie Mathews, Ted Williams, Billy Martin, Otto Graham, Bobby Layne
1954	Willie Mays	Baseball	Ezzard Charles, Neil Johnston, Paddy DeMarco, Sam Snead, Stan Musial, Willie Mays, Joe Adcock, Johnny Antonelli, Dusty Rhodes, Willie Shoemaker, Jimmy Carter, Otto Graham
1955	Otto Graham (Note: Graham's belt is now in the collection of the Pro Football Hall of Fame.)	Football	
1956	Mickey Mantle	Baseball	
1957	Carmen Basilio	Boxing	
1958	Bob Turley	Baseball	
1959	Ingemar Johansson	Boxing	Elgin Baylor (March)
1960	Arnold Palmer	Golf	
1961	Roger Maris (Note: In July 2016, the belt awarded to Maris was stolen from The Roger Maris Museum, located in Fargo, North Dakota. In 2023, following arrests, it was reported that "the belt was cut in half" and would not be returning to the museum.)	Baseball	
1962	Maury Wills	Baseball	
1963	Sandy Koufax	Baseball	
1964	Jim Brown	Football	
1965	Sandy Koufax (2)	Baseball	
1966	Frank Robinson	Baseball	
1967	Carl Yastrzemski	Baseball	
1968	Joe Namath	Football	
1969	Tom Seaver	Baseball	
1970	Brooks Robinson (Note: Robinson's belt was offered at auction in November 2015, but was not sold.)	Baseball	
1971	Lee Trevino	Golf	
1972	Steve Carlton	Baseball	Gene Tenace (Oct)
1973	O. J. Simpson	Football	
1974	Muhammad Ali	Boxing	
1975	Pete Rose (Note: A photo of Rose with his belt appears on card no. 4 of the 1985 Pete Rose baseball card set, issued by Topps. The image appears to be mirrored, given the appearance of engraving on the belt.)	Baseball	
1976	Ken Stabler (Note: Stabler's belt was submitted for auction in 2016, although the auction site listed the lot as "canceled".)	Football	
1977	not issued	—	Steve Cauthen, Steve Cauthen, Jimmy Young, Tom Watson, A. J. Foyt, Bill Walton, Tom Watson, Lou Brock, Guillermo Vilas, not issued (Oct–Dec)

=== 2012–present ===
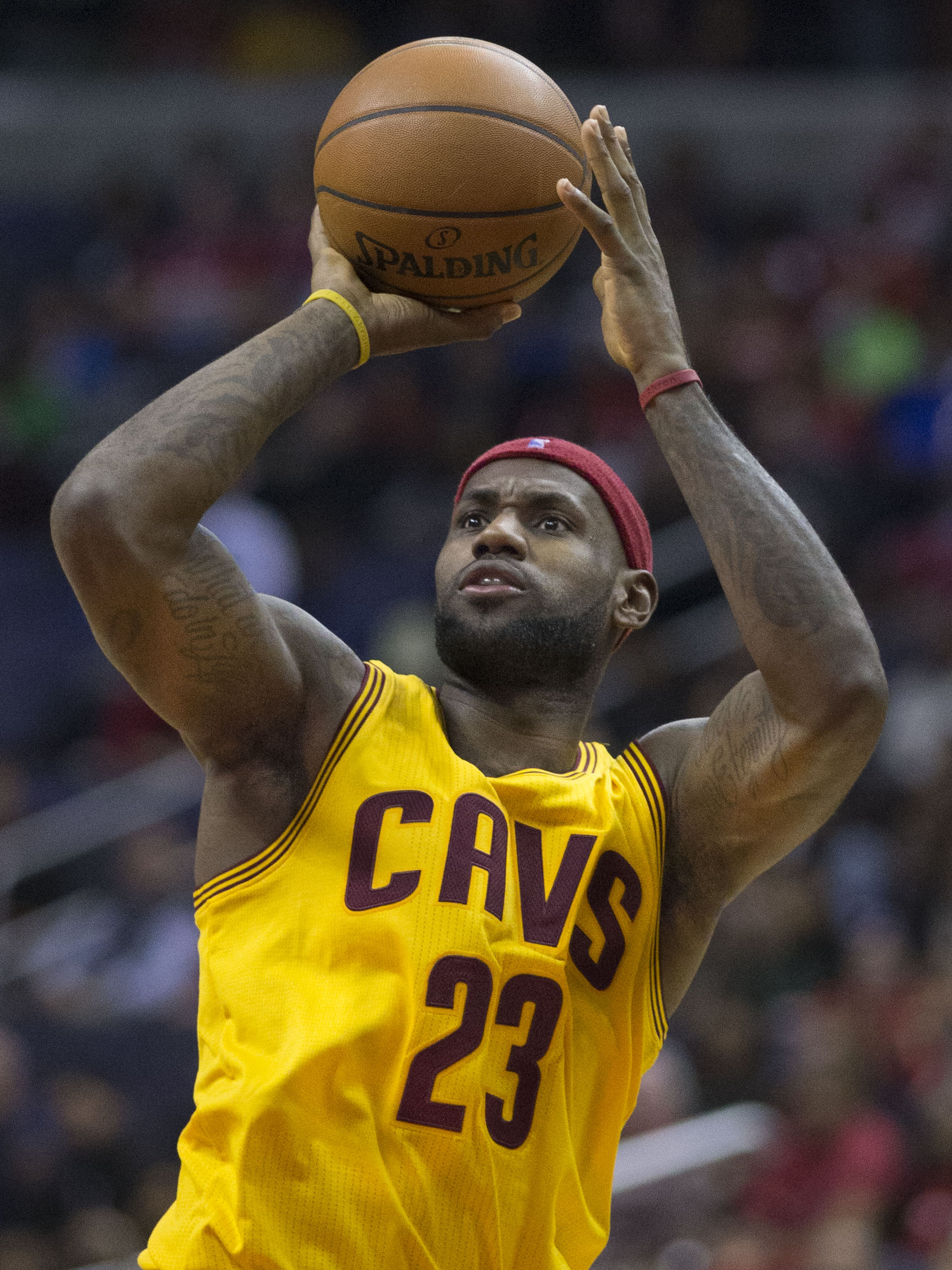
LeBron James, the first two-time winner since the award's revival

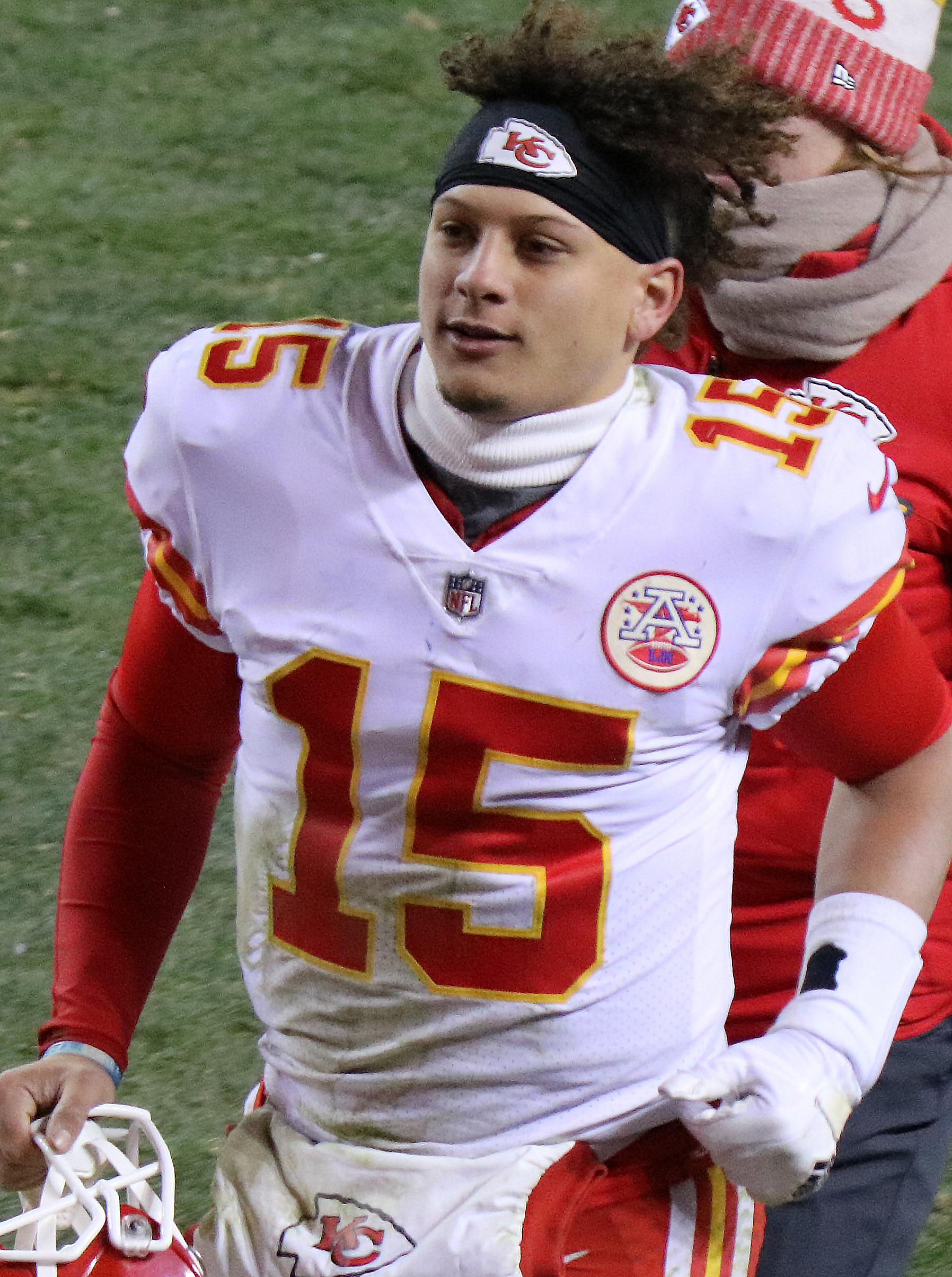
Patrick Mahomes, two-time winner

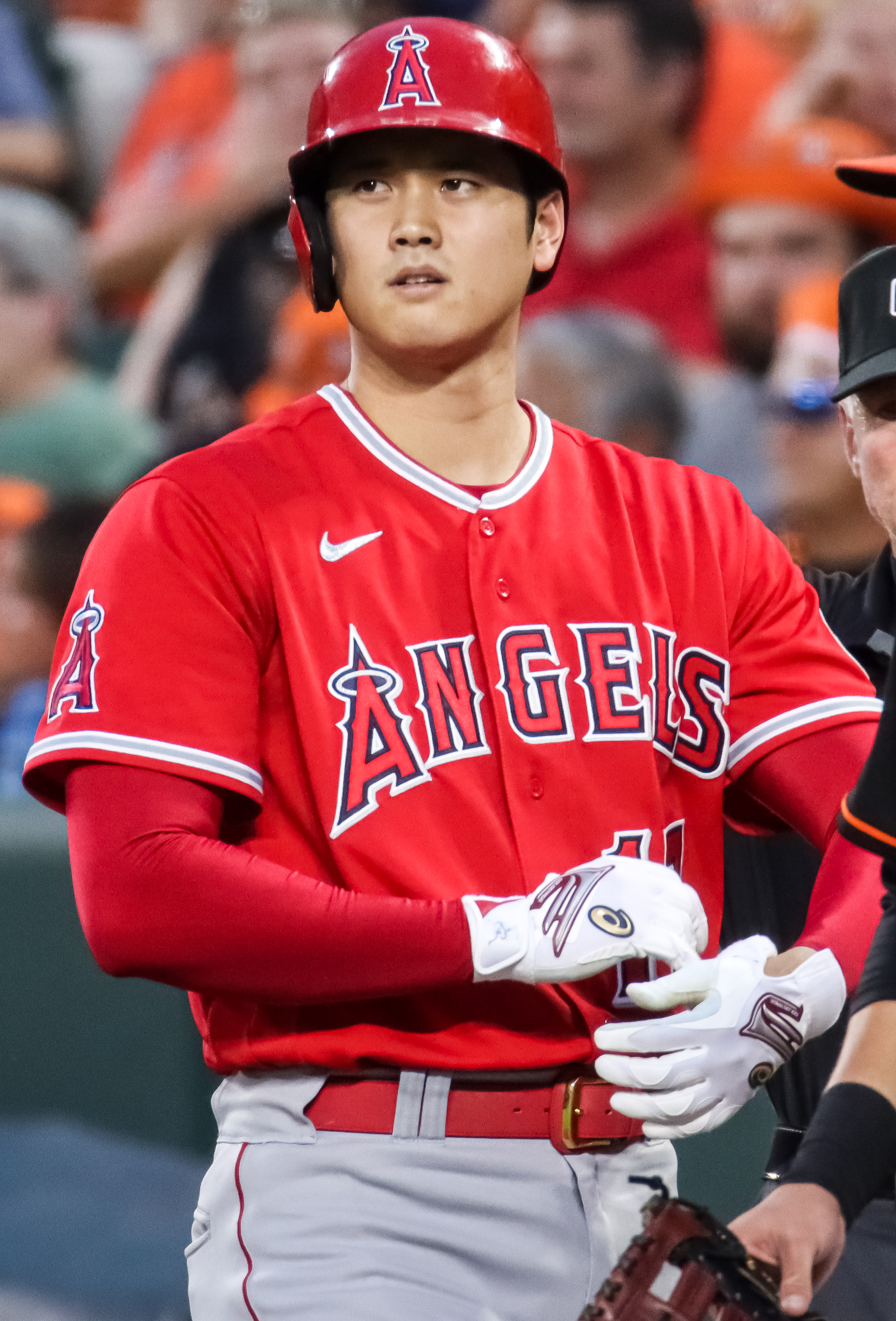
Shohei Ohtani, two-time winner and most recent recipient

Year	Winner	Sport	Monthly winners
2012	LeBron James	Basketball	Eli Manning; Jeremy Lin; Lindsey Vonn; Bubba Watson; Josh Hamilton; LeBron James; Serena Williams; Usain Bolt; Serena Williams; Pablo Sandoval; Brad Keselowski; Adrian Peterson
2013	LeBron James (2)	Basketball	Colin Kaepernick; Joe Flacco; LeBron James; LeBron James; Miguel Cabrera; LeBron James; Phil Mickelson; Miguel Cabrera; Peyton Manning; David Ortiz; Jimmie Johnson; Peyton Manning
2014	Madison Bumgarner	Baseball	Kevin Durant; Carey Price; Tuukka Rask; Bubba Watson; Nelson Cruz; Clayton Kershaw; Rory McIlroy; Rory McIlroy; Jordan Zimmermann; Madison Bumgarner; Aaron Rodgers; Marshawn Lynch
2015	Stephen Curry	Basketball	Tom Brady; James Harden; Jordan Spieth; Bryce Harper; LeBron James; Carli Lloyd; Jake Arrieta; Jordan Spieth; Daniel Murphy; Stephen Curry
2016	Michael Phelps	Swimming	Novak Djokovic; Stephen Curry; Jason Day; Jake Arrieta; Clayton Kershaw; LeBron James; Serena Williams; Michael Phelps; Rory McIlroy; Corey Kluber; Ben Zobrist; Aaron Rodgers
2017	Jose Altuve	Baseball	Serena Williams; Tom Brady; Russell Westbrook; Sergio García; LeBron James; Kevin Durant; José Altuve; Giancarlo Stanton; Corey Kluber; José Altuve; George Springer; James Harden
2018	Patrick Mahomes	Football	Nick Foles; LeBron James; Kevin Durant; Matt Carpenter; Brooks Koepka; Christian Yelich; Steve Pearce; Simone Biles; Patrick Mahomes
2019	Kawhi Leonard	Basketball	Tom Brady; Julian Edelman; Kyle Busch; Tiger Woods; Brooks Koepka; Kawhi Leonard; Novak Djokovic; Rory McIlroy; Gerrit Cole; Stephen Strasburg; Lamar Jackson; Jimmy Garoppolo
2020	Patrick Mahomes (2)	Football	Patrick Mahomes; Tyson Fury; No award (March–May) (Note: Monthly awards were temporarily suspended during 2020, amid the COVID-19 pandemic, due to the suspension of sporting events.); Dustin Johnson; Jon Rahm; Donovan Mitchell; Bryson DeChambeau; LeBron James; Dustin Johnson; Josh Allen
2021	Shohei Ohtani	Baseball	Patrick Mahomes; Naomi Osaka; Luka Dončić; Hideki Matsuyama; Phil Mickelson; Shohei Ohtani; Caeleb Dressel; Athing Mu; Emma Raducanu; Eddie Rosario; Jorge Soler; Joe Burrow
2022	Aaron Judge	Baseball	Cooper Kupp; Cooper Kupp; Giannis Antetokounmpo; Scottie Scheffler; Justin Thomas; Stephen Curry; Novak Djokovic; Rory McIlroy; Aaron Judge; Bryce Harper; Luka Dončić; Lionel Messi
2023	Nikola Jokić	Basketball	Mikaela Shiffrin; Damian Lillard; Mikaela Shiffrin; Jon Rahm; Nikola Jokić; Nikola Jokić; Carlos Alcaraz; Simone Biles; Coco Gauff; Simone Biles and Adolis García (tie); Dak Prescott; Joel Embiid
2024	Shohei Ohtani (2)	Baseball	Jannik Sinner; Patrick Mahomes; Mikaela Shiffrin; Scottie Scheffler; Luka Dončić; Simone Biles; Simone Biles; Katie Ledecky; Shohei Ohtani; Freddie Freeman; Joey Logano; Saquon Barkley
2025			Saquon Barkley; (Note: Baseball Almanac indicates that monthly awards were discontinued after January 2025.)
