= International Pacific Halibut Commission =

Intergovernmental fisheries organization

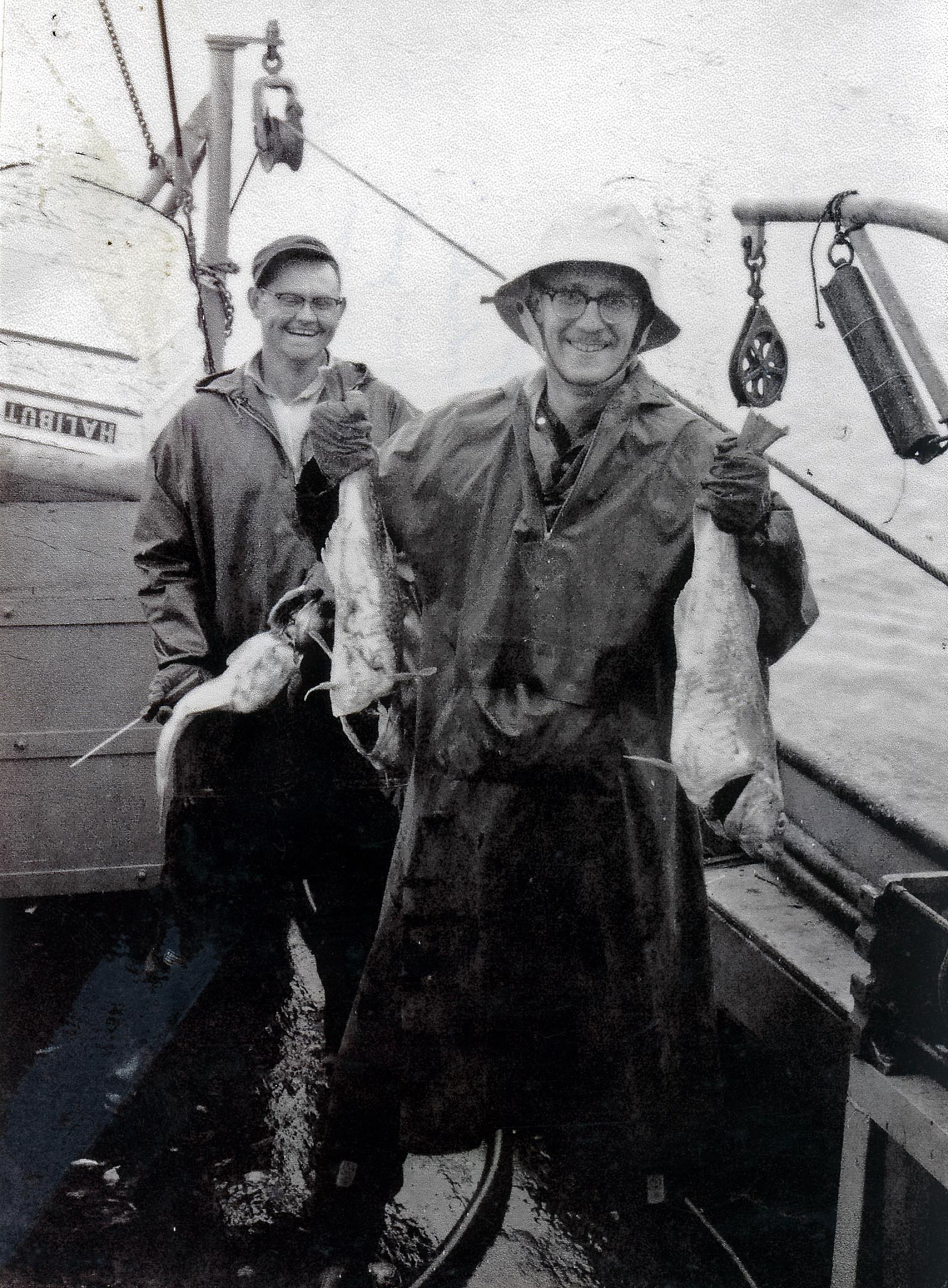
Engineer and biological aide on chartered trawler, MV Arthur H., Alaska, 1962.

The International Pacific Halibut Commission (IPHC) is an International Fisheries Organization, having Canada and the United States as its members, responsible for the management of stocks of Pacific halibut or Hippoglossus stenolepis within the Pacific waters of its member states. It was founded by an international treaty concluded on March 2, 1923. The original treaty has been revised three times (in 1953, 1976, and 1979). The 1979 amendment clarified the role of the IPHC in the management of the fishery through the North Pacific Halibut Act of 1982.

It has carried out many activities including the use of chartered commercial fishing vessels to undertake bottom trawls and long-lining for sampling fish stocks, banding fish, recording water temperatures using bathythermographs, etc., in the North Pacific and Bering Sea for many years. Also, staff have been stationed at on-shore fish processing plants to sample catches, remove otoliths to determine the age of the fish, and many other research activities. The commission holds a regularly Annual Meetings and occasionally Special Meetings as necessary.

Its offices were located on the campus of the University of Washington until November 2010. The IPHC has since moved its offices to the Interbay neighborhood of Seattle.
