= Canada Post millennium stamps =

Canada Post Millennium Collection
- Country of production: Canada
- Designer: Various
- Engraver: various
- Dimensions: 112 mm × 108 mm (4.4 in × 4.3 in)
- Commemorates: Events and people of the 20th century in Canada in 17 minisheets that commemorates various aspects of Canada
- Depicts: Various people, things, events in 4 stamps per minisheet
- Notability: Not notable
- Nature of rarity: Not rare
- Face value: 46¢x4 per minisheet

Due to popular demand, Canada Post released the 68 specially designed stamps as a series of 17 Millennium souvenir sheets from December 17, 1999 to March 17, 2000 each depicting four different stamps.

== December 1999 ==
This first series highlights pivotal Canadian subjects in the world of entertainment and the arts, including IMAX motion-picture technology, the Calgary Stampede, singer Félix Leclerc and the National Film Board. The simultaneously released Millennium Souvenir Sheet OFDCs will be cancelled in Ottawa.

=== The Millennium Collection, Canadian Entertainment ===
- Calgary Stampede

Famous throughout the world, the Calgary Stampede has put the wild in the West for more than eight decades, thrilling visitors with traditional rodeo events such as chuckwagon racing, calf roping and bareback bronc riding.

- Cirque du Soleil

A spectacular blend of music, theatre, dance and acrobatics, Cirque du Soleil has blossomed from a group of Quebec buskers into an award-winning troupe of more than 550 performers whose shows have wowed millions worldwide.

- Hockey Night in Canada

Play-by-play announcers have brought the excitement of Canada's national game into our living rooms since Foster Hewitt first went on the air in 1923. Today few broadcasting institutions are as entrenched in our culture as Hockey Night in Canada and the French-language La Soirée du hockey.

- La Soirée du hockey: Live From the Forum

Today, few broadcasting institutions are as entrenched in our culture as Hockey Night in Canada and the French-language La Soirée du hockey. During his 33 years with La Soirée, announcer René Lecavalier created a unique lexicon for the sport that is still used today.

Date of Issue	Theme	Denomination	Printer	Quantity	Perforation	Creator
17 December 1999	Cirque du Soleil: A World of Fun	46 cents	Ashton-Potter Canada Ltd.	1,000,000	13.5	Designed by Marc Serre and Daniel Fortin, Designed by George Fok Based on a photograph by Al Seib
17 December 1999	Hockey Night in Canada: "He Shoots, He Scores"	46 cents	Ashton-Potter Canada Ltd.	1,000,000	13.5	Designed by Sheri Hancock and Hélène L'Heureux, Based on a photograph by Bernard Bohn and the Hockey Hall of Fame
17 December 1999	La Soirée du hockey: Live From the Forum	46 cents	Ashton-Potter Canada Ltd.	1,000,000	13.5	Designed by Sheri Hancock and Hélène L'Heureux, Based on a photograph by Bernard Bohn and Radio-Canada
17 December 1999	The Wild West Comes Alive at the Calgary Stampede	46 cents	Ashton-Potter Canada Ltd.	1,000,000	13.5	Designed by Terry Gregoraschuk

=== The Millennium Collection, Extraordinary Entertainers ===
- Félix Leclerc

Considered the father of modern Quebec song, playwright and actor Félix Leclerc paved the way for the popular chansonnier movement and influenced the careers of many successful singers.

- Glenn Gould

Glenn Gould was one of the 20th century's most brilliant pianists. Celebrated for his unique interpretations of the work of Bach, Beethoven and other composers, the Toronto native's legacy included more than 80 works and numerous awards.

- Guy Lombardo

The leader of the top band in North America in its day, Guy Lombardo was best known for his legendary 48-years stint in New York City, where he and his Royal Canadians performed live for annual New Year's Eve broadcasts.

- Portia White

Nova Scotia-born contralto Portia White helped break the colour barrier in classical music during the 1940s, dazzling concert hall audiences in North America and abroad with her stunning voice.

Date of Issue	Theme	Denomination	Printer	Quantity	Perforation	Creator
17 December 1999	Félix Leclerc: Father of Quebec's New Song	46 cents	Ashton-Potter Canada Ltd.	1,000,000	13.5	Designed by Yvon Laroche, Based on a photograph by Jean-Louis Frund
17 December 1999	Glenn Gould's Variations	46 cents	Ashton-Potter Canada Ltd.	1,000,000	13.5	Designed by Avi Dunkelman, Based on a photograph by Walter Curtin and by Don Hunstein
17 December 1999	Guy Lombardo: Happy New Year	46 cents	Ashton-Potter Canada Ltd.	1,000,000	13.5	Designed by Russ Willms
17 December 1999	Portia White: Irrepressible Talent	46 cents	Ashton-Potter Canada Ltd.	1,000,000	13.5	Designed by Fraser Ross, Based on an illustration by Bonnie Ross, Based on a photograph by Yousuf Karsh

=== The Millennium Collection, Fostering Canadian Talent ===
- Canada Council

One of the country's most valued institutions, the Canada Council fosters the creativity of new and established artists by providing a range of grants and services to individuals, groups, professional organizations, galleries and publishing houses.

- Canadian Broadcasting Corporation

From its early days in radio to its present dynamic television networks, the Canadian Broadcasting Corporation has helped shape our national consciousness through its commitment to high-quality current affairs and entertainment programming.

- National Film Board of Canada

Dedicated to showcasing the voice and vision of Canadian filmmakers, the National Film Board of Canada, represented here by John Spotton, has produced more than 9,000 original films and earned numerous international awards over the past 60 years.

- Royal Canadian Academy of Arts

The Toronto-based Royal Canadian Academy of Arts is the oldest national organization of professional Canadian artists, and was instrumental in establishing the National Gallery of Canada in Ottawa.

Date of Issue	Theme	Denomination	Printer	Quantity	Perforation	Creator
17 December 1999	The Canada Council: Friend to the Arts	46 cents	Ashton-Potter Canada Ltd.	1,000,000	13.5	Designed by Paul Haslip
17 December 1999	Canadian Broadcasting Corporation	46 cents	Ashton-Potter Canada Ltd.	1,000,000	13.5	Designed by Clermont Malenfant, Based on a photograph by Brian Willer and by Ashley Crippen
17 December 1999	National Film Board of Canada	46 cents	Ashton-Potter Canada Ltd.	1,000,000	13.5	Designed by Geneviève Caron, Based on a photograph by National Film Board of Canada
17 December 1999	Royal Canadian Academy of Arts	46 cents	Ashton-Potter Canada Ltd.	1,000,000	13.5	Designed by Jean Michaud, Based on a photograph by Notman & Sandham

=== The Millennium Collection, Media Technologies ===
- IMAX

Originated at Montreal's Expo 67, IMAX gives movie audience a larger-than-life experience by projecting dazzling images shot on special large-format film onto screens up to eight storeys high.

- Sir William Stephenson

Before becoming an Allied super spy during the Second World War, Sir William Stephenson developed a radio facsimile device that revolutionized the newspaper industry by enabling the wireless transmission of publishable photographs.

- Softimage

Montreal-based Softimage Co. is the world's leading 2-D and 3-D animation software designer and the wizard behind the stunning special effects in such Oscar-winning blockbusters as Jurassic Park and Titanic.

- Ted Rogers, Sr.

Ted Rogers Sr. invented a tube which allowed hum-free radios to be plugged directly into electrical outlets. His work lives on in his son's telecommunications empire, which spans everything from cable television to Internet access.

Date of Issue	Theme	Denomination	Printer	Quantity	Perforation	Creator
17 December 1999	IMAX: A New Kind of Movie	46 cents	Ashton-Potter Canada Ltd.	1,000,000	13.5	Designed by Kostas Tsetsekas, Geoff Kehrig. Photos: Girl (Larry Goldstein), Africa's Elephant Kingdom (Courtesy Discovery Channel Pictures), Destiny in Space (© Smithsonian Institution/Lockheed Martin Corporation)
17 December 1999	Softimage: From the Computer Age to the Dinosaur Age	46 cents	Ashton-Potter Canada Ltd.	1,000,000	13.5	Designed by Hoover Chung
17 December 1999	Sir William Stephenson: A Man Called Inventor	46 cents	Ashton-Potter Canada Ltd.	1,000,000	13.5	Designed by Bryan Canning and Malcolm Waddell, Based on a photograph by Syd Davy
17 December 1999	Ted Rogers Sr.: Plugging in the Radio	46 cents	Ashton-Potter Canada Ltd.	1,000,000	13.5	Designed by Darrell Corriveau, Peter D.K. Scott and Glenda Rissman, Based on photographs by Liam Sharp and Rogers Communication Inc.

== January 2000 ==
January's series of four Millennium souvenir sheets features, among others, Lester B. Pearson, Terry Fox and CIDA. These bold 112-by-108 mm souvenir sheets frame four 36-by-48 mm stamps in thematic groupings that celebrate Canadian giants in fields as diverse as medicine, finance, peacekeeping and international development.

=== The Millennium Collection, Hearts of Gold ===
- CIDA

Established in 1968, the Canadian International Development Agency is responsible for administering the bulk of Canada's foreign aid budget to provide assistance for sustainable development projects in more than 100 countries.

- Canadian Missionaries

For more than a century, Canadian missionaries have dedicated their lives to working in the developing world. Montreal-born surgeon Lucille Teasdale spent more than 30 years running a hospital in Uganda before dying of AIDS she contracted while operating on an infected patient.

- Meals on Wheels

Introduced in Brantford, Ontario, in 1963, Meals on Wheels has grown to a nationwide movement with thousands of volunteers delivering nutritious meals to seniors, many of whom are poor and homebound.

- Terry Fox

Although his illness forced him to give up his Marathon of Hope, the spirit of one of Canada's most courageous young men lives on in the annual Terry Fox Run, which has earned more than $200 million for cancer research.

Date of Issue	Theme	Denomination	Printer	Quantity	Perforation	Creator
17 January 2000	CIDA: Sharing the Nation's Heart Globally	46 cents	Ashton-Potter Canada Ltd.	1,000,000	13.5	Designed by Ralph Tibbles and based on photographs by Doug Hall
17 January 2000	Lucille Teasdale and Missionaries: Helping the Poor and Sick	46 cents	Ashton-Potter Canada Ltd.	1,000,000	13.5	Designed by Pierre-Yves Pelletier
17 January 2000	Marathon of Hope	46 cents	Ashton-Potter Canada Ltd.	1,000,000	13.5	Designed and illustrated by Ken Fung, based on an illustration by Ken Koo and Samuel Tseng
17 January 2000	Meals and Friends on Wheels	46 cents	Ashton-Potter Canada Ltd.	1,000,000	13.5	Designed by Lou Cable and based on photographs by David Campbell

=== The Millennium Collection, Humanitarians and Peacekeepers ===
- Banning Landmines

Canada has played an integral role in banning anti-personal landmines, which claim an average of 500 victims a week. In 1997, 122 countries signed the historic Ottawa Convention prohibiting the use of these devices and calling for their destruction.

- Lester B. Pearson

Lester B Pearson's involvement in the creation of an international force to maintain peace in the Middle East during the Suez Crisis earned him a Nobel Peace Prize and highlighted Canada's role as a global peacekeeper.

- Pauline Vanier and Elizabeth Smellie

The wife of future Governor General Georges Vanier, Pauline Vanier served as a Red Cross volunteer in Paris during and after the Second World War. Elizabeth Smellie, the first female colonel in the Canadian Army, headed nursing services at home and abroad during both World Wars and organized the Canadian Women's Army Corps.

- Raoul Dandurand

A tireless promoter of equality, peace with justice, and security through cooperation, Montreal-born lawyer Raoul Dandurand spent 44 years as a senator and was named president of the League of Nations.

Date of Issue	Theme	Denomination	Printer	Quantity	Perforation	Creator
17 January 2000	Canada's Historic Role in Banning Land Mines	46 cents	Ashton-Potter Canada Ltd.	1,000,000	13.5	Designed by Carisa L. Romans and by Robert L. Peters
17 January 2000	Lester B. Pearson: On Guard for World Peace	46 cents	Ashton-Potter Canada Ltd.	1,000,000	13.5	Designed by Kiky Kambylis Based on an illustration by Thom Sevalrud
17 January 2000	Pauline Vanier and Elizabeth Smellie: The Humanitarian Work of Women in Time of War	46 cents	Ashton-Potter Canada Ltd.	1,000,000	13.5	Designed by Margaret Susan Issenman Based on photographs by National Archives of Canada = Archives Based on an illustration by Bonnie Ross
17 January 2000	Raoul Dandurand: Senator and Diplomat	46 cents	Ashton-Potter Canada Ltd.	1,000,000	13.5	Designed by Raymond BellemareDesigned by Tom Yakobina, Based on a photograph by Christine Guest and by Paul McCarthy, Based on a painting by Mary Alexandra Bell Eastlake

=== The Millennium Collection, Medical Innovators ===
- Sir Frederick Banting

Nobel Prize-winner Sir Frederick Banting was one of the century's greatest medical heroes. His discovery of a pancreatic extract called insulin, achieved with his assistant Charles Best and other colleagues, has saved the lives of millions of diabetics.

- Armand Frappier

A champion in the war against disease, Quebec physician Armand Frappier helped establish a preventative treatment for infant leukemia and founded studies in immunology, advanced microbiology and hygiene at the Université de Montréal.

- Maude Abbott

Curator of the McGill University Medical Museum and a founder of the Federation of Medical Women of Canada, Dr. Maude Abbott overcame the gender-based odds against her to become an internationally respected pathologist and a world authority on heart defects.

- Dr. Hans Selye

The scientific work of Vienna-born Hans Selye, an endocrinologist at the Université de Montréal, greatly increased our understanding of the biological factors causing stress and of how to control it.

Date of Issue	Theme	Denomination	Printer	Quantity	Perforation	Creator
17 January 2000	Armand Frappier: Champion Disease Fighter	46 cents	Ashton-Potter Canada Ltd.	1,000,000	13.5	Designed by Louise Delisle and Jean-Claude Guénette, Based on photographs by François Brunelle and Federal Newsphotos of Canada
17 January 2000	Maude Abbott: The Heart of the Matter	46 cents	Ashton-Potter Canada Ltd.	1,000,000	13.5	Designed by Tom Yakobina, Based on a photograph by Christine Guest and by Paul McCarthy, Based on a painting by Mary Alexandra Bell Eastlake
17 January 2000	Dr. Hans Selye: Documenting the Stress of Life	46 cents	Ashton-Potter Canada Ltd.	1,000,000	13.5	Designed by Stéphane Huot, Based on a photograph by Fondation Hans Selye

=== The Millennium Collection, Social Progress ===
- Alphonse and Dorimène Desjardins

Founded a century ago by Alphonse and Dorimène Desjardins, the caisse populaire is Quebec's largest financial institution and the global model for savings and loan cooperatives where customers are both owners and users.

- Health Care

Canada's tradition of universal access to health care owes much to the efforts of the religious orders that established Quebec's first hospitals, and to the example set by Saskatchewan when it became the first province to enact full medicare coverage.

- Moses Coady

Moses Coady's vision of social betterment through adult education launched a revolutionary cooperative movement in the Maritimes that is still emulated by social activists and educators, particularly in developing countries.

- Women's Rights

Tireless dedication to equal rights spurred five Alberta women to victory in a historic court ruling that recognized women as qualified for Senate appointments - thereby paving the way for Canada's first female senator in 1930.

Date of Issue	Theme	Denomination	Printer	Quantity	Perforation	Creator
17 January 2000	Alphonse and Dorimène Desjardins: Small Savings, Big Results	46 cents	Ashton-Potter Canada Ltd.	1,000,000	13.5	Designed by François Dallaire, Based on an illustration by Bernard Leduc
17 January 2000	From Les Hospitalières de Québec to Medicare	46 cents	Ashton-Potter Canada Ltd.	1,000,000	13.5	Designed by François Blais, Based on a photograph by Yves Lacombe
17 January 2000	Moses Coady and the Cooperative Movement	46 cents	Ashton-Potter Canada Ltd.	1,000,000	13.5	Designed by Derek Sarty, Based on a photograph by Yousuf Karsh
17 February 2000	Women are Persons...	46 cents	Ashton-Potter Canada Ltd.	1,000,000	13.5	Designed by Susan Lee, Based on a photograph by Verve Photographics, Based on a sculpture by Barbara Paterson

== February 2000 ==
February's Millennium souvenir sheets continue the tribute to the wide range of Canadian people, events and institutions that have helped shape our nation. This third release - the second last in the series - presents such individuals as philosopher Northrop Frye and "Plouffe Family" author Roger Lemelin and celebrates the spirit and vision of Canadian philanthropy. Aboriginal contributions to peace, healing and sport are featured, as well as Canada's proud heritage in the theatre and popular literature.

=== The Millennium Collection, A Tradition of Generosity ===
- Eric Lafferty Harvie

After drillers struck oil on land where he held mineral rights, lawyer Eric Lafferty Harvie used much of the resulting multimillion-dollar fortune benevolently. He assisted such diverse organizations as Glenbow Foundation, the Calgary Zoo and the Banff Centre for the Arts.

- Izaak Walton Killam

The wealthiest Canadian of his day, Nova Scotia-born financial wizard Izaak Walton Killam and his wife Dorothy donated a large part of their fortune to supporting the arts, education and sciences in Canada. Established in 1968, the Canadian International Development Agency is responsible for administering the bulk of Canada's foreign aid budget to provide assistance for sustainable development projects in more than 100 countries.

- Massey Foundation

Hart Massey's estate, which became the Massey Foundation in 1918, has supported many philanthropic endeavours.

- Macdonald Stewart Foundation

This Montreal-based foundation has promoted and preserved a great deal of Canada's historical and cultural heritage.

Date of Issue	Theme	Denomination	Printer	Quantity	Perforation	Creator
17 February 2000	Eric Lafferty Harvie: Alberta's Heart of Gold	46 cents	Ashton-Potter Canada Ltd.	1,000,000	13.5	Designed by Tim Nokes
17 February 2000	The Killam Legacy	46 cents	Ashton-Potter Canada Ltd.	1,000,000	13.5	Designed by Dennis George Page, Based on an illustration by Todd Hawkins
17 February 2000	Massey Foundation	46 cents	Ashton-Potter Canada Ltd.	1,000,000	13.5	Designed by Tim Nokes
17 February 2000	Macdonald Stewart Foundation	46 cents	Ashton-Potter Canada Ltd.	1,000,000	13.5	Designed by Dennis George Page, Based on an illustration by Todd Hawkins

=== The Millennium Collection, Canada's Cultural Fabric ===
- L'Anse aux Meadows

The oldest known European settlement in the New World, l'Anse aux Meadows, Newfoundland, was established by Norse colonists a thousand years ago.

- Neptune Theatre

Halifax is home to a cultural tradition that took root in the early 17th century, when the Neptune Theatre's predecessor, Le Théâtre de Neptune de la Nouvelle-France held its first performance at Port Royal, Nova Scotia.

- Pier 21

In the past century, some 1.5 million immigrants, refugees and displaced persons arrived on our shores at Halifax's Pier 21, which served as a symbol of hope, dreams and opportunity for newcomers to Canada.

- Stratford Festival

Although its history spans just less than 50 years, Ontario's Stratford Festival has become the jewel of North American classical theatre, specialized in showcasing the works of William Shakespeare.

Date of Issue	Theme	Denomination	Printer	Quantity	Perforation	Creator
17 February 2000	L'Anse aux Meadows: World Heritage Site	46 cents	Ashton-Potter Canada Ltd.	1,000,000	13.5	Designed by Susan Warr and based on a photograph by James Steeves
17 February 2000	The Neptune Story	46 cents	Ashton-Potter Canada Ltd.	1,000,000	13.5	Designed by Bruce Kierstead and based on photographs by James Steeves and Wally Hayes, and based on illustrations by Kevin Sollows and Graham Tuck
17 February 2000	Pier 21: Welcome to Canada	46 cents	Ashton-Potter Canada Ltd.	1,000,000	13.5	Designed by Horst Deppe and Fraser Ross, based on a photograph by National Archives of Canada
17 February 2000	The Stratford Festival: Canada's Midsummer Night's Dream	46 cents	Ashton-Potter Canada Ltd.	1,000,000	13.5	Designed by Les Holloway, based on a photograph by Cylla von Tiedemann and by Terry Manzo

=== The Millennium Collection, Canada's First Peoples ===
- Aboriginal Peoples

Aboriginal peoples have always been a vital part of Canada's heritage. Believed to possess supernatural powers, the shaman plays an integral role in Aboriginal life, serving as a mystical guide who helps heal the sick, influence the weather, and interpret dreams. Shamans and elders take a holistic approach to health based on physical, emotional, psychological and spiritual balance.

- Inuit Shaman

Believed to possess supernatural powers, the shaman plays an integral role in Aboriginal life, serving as a mystical guide who helps heal the sick, influence the weather, and interpret dreams. Shamans and elders take a holistic approach to health based on physical, emotional, psychological and spiritual balance.

- Pontiac

A noble warrior and chief of the Odawa tribe during the 18th century, Pontiac persuaded the British crown to recognize the legal rights of Aboriginal tribes to claim title to the lands they occupied.

- Tom Longboat

Nicknamed "Wildfire" for his amazing speed, Onondaga distance runner Tom Longboat was one of the most celebrated athletes of the early 1900s, and the fastest professional in the world over 15 miles.

Date of Issue	Theme	Denomination	Printer	Quantity	Perforation	Creator
17 February 2000	Healing From Within	46 cents	Ashton-Potter Canada Ltd.	1,000,000	13.5	Designed and illustrated by Jerry Evans
17 February 2000	Pontiac: Warrior and Peacemaker	46 cents	Ashton-Potter Canada Ltd.	1,000,000	13.5	Designed by Rolf P. Harder
17 February 2000	The Powers of Inuit Shamans	46 cents	Ashton-Potter Canada Ltd.	1,000,000	13.5	Designed by James Skipp and based on a photograph by Gary Fiegehen, based on a sculpture by Paul Toolooktook
17 February 2000	Tom Longboat: Marathon Man	46 cents	Ashton-Potter Canada Ltd.	1,000,000	13.5	Designed by Sunil Bhandari and by Georges Khayat, Based on a photograph by Canada's Sports Hall of Fame

=== The Millennium Collection, Canada's Great Thinkers ===
- Hilda Marion Neatby

Head of the history department at the University of Saskatchewan, Hilda Marion Neatby had a lifelong love of learning, and stressed the importance of challenging the human mind.

- Marshall McLuhan

Edmonton-born Marshall McLuhan remains a cultural icon as Canada's pioneer pop philosopher and oracle of the electronic age. An English professor and literary critic, his books revolutionized thinking about media and communications.

- Northrop Frye

Regarded as one of the world's most influential literary critics, Northrop Frye's prolific and frequently cited writings outlined the shape of human thought and helped educate our imaginations about the power of the written world.

- Roger Lemelin

The literary patriarch of the fictional Plouffe family whose exploits were later immortalized on both film and television, Roger Lemelin was a pioneer of social realism in French-speaking Canada.

Date of Issue	Theme	Denomination	Printer	Quantity	Perforation	Creator
17 February 2000	Hilda Marion Neatby: In Love with Learning	46 cents	Ashton-Potter Canada Ltd.	1,000,000	13.5	Designed by Stacey Zabolotney and based on an illustration by Stephanie Carter
17 February 2000	Marshall McLuhan: The Man with a Message	46 cents	Ashton-Potter Canada Ltd.	1,000,000	13.5	Designed by Ian Drolet and based on a photograph by Robert J. Fleming
17 February 2000	Northrop Frye: The Well-Tempered Critic	46 cents	Ashton-Potter Canada Ltd.	1,000,000	13.5	Designed by Brian Tsang and based on a photograph by Lutz Dille
17 February 2000	Roger Lemelin and the Plouffe Family	46 cents	Ashton-Potter Canada Ltd.	1,000,000	13.5	Designed by Pierre Fontaine and based on a photograph by Radio-Canada

=== The Millennium Collection, Literary Legends ===
- Gratien Gélinas

A talented actor, director, producer and playwright, Gratien Gélinas is considered the father of contemporary Quebec theatre. His remarkable career ran the gamut from staging theatrical revues to co-founding Montreal's National Theatre School.

- Harlequin

Manitoba's chilly capital is the birthplace of a sizzling romantic literary tradition that transformed Harlequin Books from a small company into the world's leading paperback publisher. Today, its titles appear in 24 languages.

- Pierre Tisseyre

Pierre Tisseyre promoted Canada's French-language literary tradition by adapting the book-of-the-month club concept for a Quebec readership. His publishing house has help launch the careers of numerous Quebec writers.

- W.O. Mitchell

W.O. Mitchell is one of Canada's most celebrated writers. The Saskatchewan-born novelist and dramatist's carefully crafted prose - which include the classical Who Has Seen the Wind - reveal a gifted artist intrigued by the human experience.

Date of Issue	Theme	Denomination	Printer	Quantity	Perforation	Creator
17 February 2000	Gratien Gélinas: On Stage in Montreal	46 cents	Ashton-Potter Canada Ltd.	1,000,000	13.5	Designed by Pierre Fontaine, Based on a photograph by André Le Coz
17 February 2000	Harlequin: Winnipeg's Romantic Side	46 cents	Ashton-Potter Canada Ltd.	1,000,000	13.5	Designed by Gary Ludwig, Based on a photograph by Siede Preis
17 February 2000	Pierre Tisseyre and the Cercle du livre de France	46 cents	Ashton-Potter Canada Ltd.	1,000,000	13.5	Designed by Catharine Bradbury, Based on an illustration by Dean Bartsch
17 February 2000	W.O. Mitchell: The Prairie Son	46 cents	Ashton-Potter Canada Ltd.	1,000,000	13.5	Designed by Catharine Bradbury, Based on an illustration by Dean Bartsch

== March 2000 ==
March's series of four Millennium Souvenir Sheets features among other, Bell Canada, Bombardier, the Canadian Space Program and McCain Foods. These bold 112 x 108 mm souvenir sheets frame four 36 x 48 mm stamps in thematic groupings that celebrate Canadian giants in fields as diverse as engineering, commerce and innovation.

=== The Millennium Collection, Engineering and Technological Marvels ===
- Rogers Pass

The longest tunnel in North America provides safe passage through the avalanche prone Rogers Pass in British Columbia.

- Manic Dams

Québec's 455-km long Manicouagan River supports one of the world's largest hydroelectric operations.

- Canadian Space Program

A world leader in space exploration, Canada's technological innovations include a robotic Canadarm used aboard US shuttle missions and the Mobile Servicing System foe the International Space Station.

- CN Tower

Standing 553.33 metres tall, the CN Tower, which was built in 1976, was the world's tallest building and free standing structure until 2009.

Date of Issue	Theme	Denomination	Printer	Quantity	Perforation	Creator
17 March 2000	Rogers Pass: Building Bridges and Tunnels	46 cents	Ashton-Potter Canada Ltd.	1,000,000	13.5	Neville Smith
17 March 2000	Manic Dams: Triumph of Quebec Engineering	46 cents	Ashton-Potter Canada Ltd.	1,000,000	13.5	Susan Scott
17 March 2000	Canadian Space Program	46 cents	Ashton-Potter Canada Ltd.	1,000,000	13.5	Monique Dufour and Sophie Lafortune
17 March 2000	CN Tower - Canada's National Tower	46 cents	Ashton-Potter Canada Ltd.	1,000,000	13.5	Doreen Colonello and Stuart Bradley Ash, based on a photo by Robert Wigington

=== The Millennium Collection, Enterprising Giants ===
- Bell Canada Enterprises

Canada's largest communication company, Bell Canada Enterprises is a global industry player that offers telephone, satellite television and other communication services to clients in 150 countries.

- Hudson's Bay Company

Over the more than three centuries since it began as a fur trading business in the Canadian wilderness, the Hudson's Bay Company has grown into our nation's largest non-food retailer through its chain of Bay and Zellers department stores. Canada's largest communication company, Bell Canada Enterprises is a global industry player that offers telephone, satellite television and other communication services to clients in 150 countries.

- Rose-Anna Vachon

From the kitchen where founder Rose-Anna Vachon perfected her tiny treats to a modern bakery that turns out some two million cakes daily, the Vachon company of Sainte-Marie-de-Beauce, Quebec, has been tantalizing tastebuds since 1923.

- George Weston

Founded in 1882, George Weston Limited has expanded from baking bread and biscuits to a conglomerate that includes the country's largest food distributor, Loblaws Companies Limited.

Date of Issue	Theme	Denomination	Printer	Quantity	Perforation	Creator
17 March 2000	Bell Canada Enterprises: Bringing the World Together	46 cents	Ashton-Potter Canada Ltd.	1,000,000	13.5	Neville Smith
17 March 2000	Hudson's Bay Company	46 cents	Ashton-Potter Canada Ltd.	1,000,000	13.5	Susan Scott
17 March 2000	Rose-Anna Vachon: Baker from the Beauce	46 cents	Ashton-Potter Canada Ltd.	1,000,000	13.5	Monique Dufour and Sophie Lafortune
17 March 2000	Weston: The Bread Man Cometh	46 cents	Ashton-Potter Canada Ltd.	1,000,000	13.5	Doreen Colonello and Stuart Bradley Ash, based on a photo by Robert Wigington

=== The Millennium Collection, Fathers of Invention ===
- Abraham Gesner

Abraham Gesner gave the world a better light by creating a new lamp oil called kerosene in 1846. Recognized as the founder of the oil industry, his process for distilling bituminous material was later used to produce petroleum.

- Alexander Graham Bell

Known around the globe as the father of the telephone, Alexander Graham Bell made numerous scientific discoveries at his home on Cape Breton Island, where he worked on everything from a person-carrying kite to a record-setting hydrofoil.

- George Klein

Canada's most prolific modern inventor, Hamilton-born engineer George Klein developed ground-breaking technologies in the fields of health, space and transportation, and headed the design of Canada's first nuclear reactor.

- Joseph-Armand Bombardier

Quebec mechanic Joseph-Armand Bombardier changed winter recreation and travel forever with his invention of the snowmobile. Since selling its first Ski-Doo in 1959, Bombardier has also expanded into the rail, aerospace and defence sectors.

Date of Issue	Theme	Denomination	Printer	Quantity	Perforation	Creator
17 March 2000	Abraham Gesner: Father of the Oil Industry	46 cents	Ashton-Potter Canada Ltd.	1,000,000	13.5	Designed by Steven Slipp and based on an illustration by David Preston-Smith
17 March 2000	Alexander Graham Bell: An Inquiring Mind	46 cents	Ashton-Potter Canada Ltd.	1,000,000	13.5	Designed by Julien LeBlanc Based on a photograph by Alexander Graham Bell National Historic Based on an illustration by Bonnie Ross
17 March 2000	George Klein: Canada's Inventor of the 20th Century	46 cents	Ashton-Potter Canada Ltd.	1,000,000	13.5	Designed by Tiit Telmet Based on a photograph by National Research Council Canada = Based on an illustration by Marko Barac
17 March 2000	Joseph-Armand Bombardier: Getting Around in the Winter	46 cents	Ashton-Potter Canada Ltd.	1,000,000	13.5	Designed by Michèle Cayer Based on a photograph by Musée J. Armand Bombardier Based on an illustration by Tom Kapas

=== The Millennium Collection, Food, Glorious Food! ===
- Archibald Gowanlock Huntsman

Ontario-born marine biologist Archibald Gowanlock Huntsman pioneered methods of packaging frozen fish fillets in the late 1920s, thirty years before the technique became a viable business.

- McCain Foods

Thanks to the strong business acumen of a New Brunswick family, McCain Foods Limited has grown from a small factory to a group of companies that earns $5.1 billion annually from its frozen food products.

- Pablum

Babies of the world have Canadian pediatrician Frederick Tisdall and his collaborators to thank for the popular ready-to-eat cereal Pablum. Developed as a healthy yet tasty solid food, its sales have raised millions for pediatric research.

- Sir Charles Saunders

Sir Charles Saunders established Canada's reputation as a leading producer of quality wheat by developing a new strain called Marquis, which matured early, produced a high yield and had superior milling and baking qualities.

Date of Issue	Theme	Denomination	Printer	Quantity	Perforation	Creator
17 March 2000	Dr. Archibald Gowanlock Huntsman: The Fisherman's Friend	46 cents	Ashton-Potter Canada Ltd.	1,000,000	13.5	Designed and illustrated by Paul-Michael Brunelle, Based on a photograph by James Steeves, Based on an illustration by David Preston-Smith
17 March 2000	McCain Foods, Lord of the Freezer	46 cents	Ashton-Potter Canada Ltd.	1,000,000	13.5	Designed by Jim Hudson, Based on a photograph by Rod Stears, Based on a photograph by Tourism and Parks New Brunswick = Tourisme et parcs Nouveau-Brunswick
17 March 2000	Sir Charles Saunders: The Marquis of Wheat	46 cents	Ashton-Potter Canada Ltd.	1,000,000	13.5	Designed by Ivan Novotny and John Taylor, Based on a photograph by Canadian Agriculture Library = Bibliothèque canadienne de l'agriculture, Based on a photograph by Canada Science and Technology Museum = Musée des sciences et de la technologie du Canada, Based on an illustration by Patrick Sayers
17 March 2000	Pablum: Babies Actually Like It	46 cents	Ashton-Potter Canada Ltd.	1,000,000	13.5	Designed by Mark Koudis, based on a photograph by Ron Baxter Smith

== See also ==
- Millennium stamp
