= West Acres Shopping Center =

Coordinates: 46°51′33″N 96°50′48″W

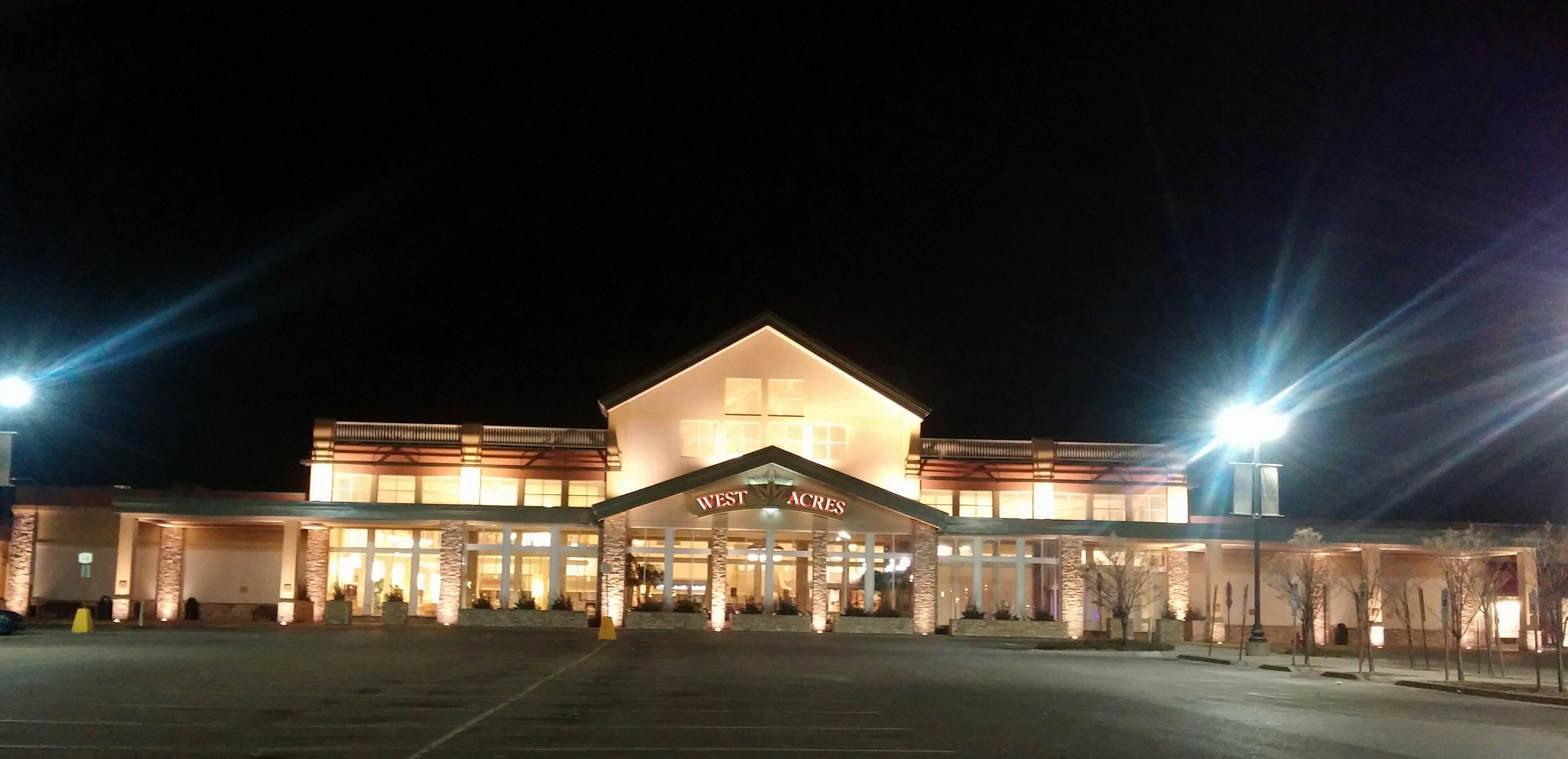
- Location: Fargo, North Dakota, United States
- Address: 3902 13th Ave. S
- Opened: August 2, 1972
- Developer: William (Bill) Schlossman
- Manager: West Acres Management
- Owner: West Acres Development, LLP
- Num. of stores: 100+
- Num. of anchor tenants: 4
- Floor area: 950,000 sq ft (88,000 m^{2}).
- Floors: 1 (2 in JCPenney)
- Parking: 5,000+
- Public transit: MATBUS
- Website: westacres.com

West Acres Shopping Center is a regional shopping mall located in Fargo, North Dakota, near the intersection of Interstate 29 and 94. It is the largest mall in North Dakota. The anchor stores are JCPenney, Macy's, Best Buy, and Von Maur with one vacant junior anchor that will be an L.L. Bean. It also includes nearly 130 stores and services, a 750-seat food court, and The District, a collection of indoor & outdoor restaurants. The mall is also home to The Roger Maris Museum, a collection of regional art including the Aptitude Art Studio, the Touchstone Energy Dinosaur Playland, and a number of spearfishing decoys created by John Jensen.

== History ==
West Acres Shopping Center was developed in August 1972 by William A. Schlossman along with several other investors. Upon opening, the mall featured Dayton's, Sears, and Fargo-based DeLendrecie's — relocating from its earlier downtown location. The Dayton's store was the first outside the state of Minnesota. The Forum and KXJB-TV once had offices in the mall since the opening but closed sometime later. A 1979 expansion added JCPenney as a fourth anchor. DeLendrecie's became Herberger's in 1998, and a food court was added in 2000. The Dayton's store was re-branded Marshall Field's in 2001, and Macy's in 2006.

In December 2012, the mall reached full occupancy. Since then, some national stores including Justice and Gap Kids have closed, but were replaced by new stores like Ragstock, Sephora, Boot Barn, Lululemon and Athleta. Sears closed their location at the mall in 2017. In 2018, Bon-Ton owned Herberger's announced plans to shutter their anchor location and filed for bankruptcy. Additionally, Best Buy relocated from a mall outlet to the former Sears space. The former Best Buy space was filled by Boot Barn, Guitar Center and Foss Swim School. To fill the unused remaining space in the former Sears, the mall announced plans for The District, a multimillion-dollar development featuring numerous restaurants with indoor and outdoor seating. It is currently in phase 1 of a multi phase project. The first restaurant, Crave American Kitchen & Sushi Bar, opened in late 2019. In January 2022, it was announced that the West Acres mall owners purchased the vacant Herberger's building that was once owned by Bon-Ton at an auction. West Acres owners announced plans to redevelop the property.

An original centerpiece within the mall is the Fountain of Abundance, created and refurbished by Minnesota State University Moorhead art professor, P. Richard Szeitz. The fountain was originally located in front of Dayton's and was later moved to the JCPenney front entrance in 2001 during the construction of the food court.

Other featured artists whose work can be found in the mall include Marjorie Schlossman, Black Pinto Horse (Monte Yellow Bird), Walter Piehl, Star Wallowing Bull, Dan Jones, Robert Crowe, Carl Oltvelt, Ellen Deidrich, Brad Bachmeier, and Alfred Dacoteau. In 2007, West Acres was named the Business Art's Advocate by the Lake Agassiz Arts Council.

On April 10, 2019, At Home announced plans to open in the former Herberger's, but it never came to fruition. In May 2023, Von Maur announced the opening of a 90,000 SF location in the former Herberger’s. The department store opened on April 5, 2025. As of 2025, the mall is nearly occupied.
