= Canadian ice hockey stamps =

Ice hockey has been a key element of Canada's cultural and social history. This has been captured on various releases from Canada Post. In 1956 Canada Post Office released a 5¢ stamp paying tribute to Canadian hockey players for "the prestige they have earned for Canada in international competition." Releases of the late 20th century included the commemoration of the XV Olympic Winter Games held in Calgary, a three-stamp set honouring the 75th anniversary of the National Hockey League, the 100th anniversary of the Stanley Cup, and the 25th anniversary of the 1972 Summit Series. In the 2000s, the key release has been the series of National Hockey League All-Stars. The series lasted from 2000 to 2005. Other hockey issues have included a commemorative envelope to commemorate the 25th anniversary of the International Postal Hockey Tournament and a stamp to commemorate the 2002 Winter Olympics in Salt Lake City, Utah featured a hockey player.

== National Hockey League All-Star Stamps ==
The world of sports is not without its celebrations in the 2000 millennium year, and perhaps first among them was the 50th National Hockey League (NHL) All-Star Game. Held on February 6, 2000 in Toronto, host city of the first official all-star game in 1947, the match was the centrepiece of the all-star weekend at the Air Canada Centre. In honour of this historic Canadian event, Canada Post is proud to present a commemorative six-stamp issue featuring some of this country's greatest hockey stars.

Available as a 6-stamp souvenir sheet with a souvenir folder, the same 6-stamp souvenir sheet without a folder, and on an OFDC three-pack, this domestic-rate release pays tribute to a tradition that reaches back to hockey's early days. The souvenir sheet features an All-Star lineup of Canadian hockey greats including Wayne Gretzky "The Great One", Gordie Howe "Mr. Hockey", Maurice "Rocket" Richard, Doug Harvey, Bobby Orr and Jacques Plante.

Early all-star matches were staged to raise funds in support of the families of ailing or deceased players. The first such game took place on January 2, 1908, when the Hod Stuart Memorial Match was held for the family of the late Montreal Wanderers defenseman who had died in a diving accident. The NHL tradition of selecting first- and second-team all-stars began in 1930-31 season. Three years later, the Toronto Maple Leafs defeated an NHL all-star team 7-3 in a match to benefit Toronto forward Ace Bailey and his family. Bailey's career had ended a few months before when he fractured his skull during a game in Boston. The 50th game falls in 2000 though the tradition of an annual all-star game began 53 years ago. Two matches were pre-empted by speciality series - the 1979 Challenge Cup and Rendez-Vous '87.

Combining canvas illustration and computer design, artists Dan Fell and Vincent McIndoe joined forces for the 50th NHL All-Star Game issue. Action vignettes featuring the players appear to emerge from the spotlighted ice surface, drawing attention to the famous careers brought together for this special all-star game. The all-star logo is flanked by vignettes of the silhouettes of Maple Leaf Gardens and the Air Canada Centre - sites of the first and 50th HNL All-Star Game. Each star in the row of five along the bottom of the souvenir sheet symbolizes ten years of All-Star match-ups.

=== 2000 ===
Year of Issue	Player	Denomination	Design	Printer	Quantity
2000	Wayne Gretzky	46 cents	Designed by Dan Fell, Based on an illustration by Vincent McIndoe	Canadian Bank Note Company, Limited	6 000 000
2000	Gordie Howe	46 cents	Designed by Dan Fell, Based on an illustration by Vincent McIndoe	Canadian Bank Note Company, Limited	6 000 000
2000	Maurice Richard	46 cents	Designed by Dan Fell, Based on an illustration by Vincent McIndoe	Canadian Bank Note Company, Limited	6 000 000
2000	Doug Harvey	46 cents	Designed by Dan Fell, Based on an illustration by Vincent McIndoe	Canadian Bank Note Company, Limited	6 000 000
2000	Bobby Orr	46 cents	Designed by Dan Fell, Based on an illustration by Vincent McIndoe	Canadian Bank Note Company, Limited	6 000 000
2000	Jacques Plante	46 cents	Designed by Dan Fell, Based on an illustration by Vincent McIndoe	Canadian Bank Note Company, Limited	6 000 000

=== 2001 ===
Date of Issue	Theme	Denomination	Design	First Day Cover Cancellation
18 January 2001	NHL All-Stars, Jean Beliveau	47 cents	Stephane Huot and Charles Vinh	N/A
18 January 2001	NHL All-Stars, Eddie Shore	47 cents	Stephane Huot and Charles Vinh	N/A
18 January 2001	NHL All-Stars, Terry Sawchuk	47 cents	Stephane Huot and Charles Vinh	N/A
18 January 2001	NHL All-Stars, Denis Potvin	47 cents	Stephane Huot and Charles Vinh	N/A
18 January 2001	NHL All-Stars, Bobby Hull	47 cents	Stephane Huot and Charles Vinh	N/A
18 January 2001	NHL All-Stars, Syl Apps	47 cents	Stephane Huot and Charles Vinh	N/A

=== 2002 ===
Date of Issue	Theme	Denomination	Printer	Quantity	Design	Perforation	First Day Cover Cancellation
12 January 2002	NHL All-Stars, Tim Horton	47 cents	Canadian Bank Note Company, Limited	1 500 000	Designed by Stéphane Huot and Based on an illustration by Charles Vinh	12.5 x 13	N/A
12 January 2002	NHL All-Stars, Guy Lafleur	47 cents	Canadian Bank Note Company, Limited	1 500 000	Designed by Stéphane Huot and Based on an illustration by Charles Vinh	12.5 x 13	N/A
12 January 2002	NHL All-Stars, Howie Morenz	47 cents	Canadian Bank Note Company, Limited	1 500 000	Designed by Stéphane Huot and Based on an illustration by Charles Vinh	12.5 x 13	N/A
12 January 2002	NHL All-Stars, Glenn Hall	47 cents	Canadian Bank Note Company, Limited	1 500 000	Designed by Stéphane Huot and Based on an illustration by Charles Vinh	12.5 x 13	N/A
12 January 2002	NHL All-Stars, Red Kelly	47 cents	Canadian Bank Note Company, Limited	1 500 000	Designed by Stéphane Huot and Based on an illustration by Charles Vinh	12.5 x 13	N/A
12 January 2002	NHL All-Stars, Phil Esposito	47 cents	Canadian Bank Note Company, Limited	1 500 000	Designed by Stéphane Huot and Based on an illustration by Charles Vinh	12.5 x 13	N/A

=== 2003 ===
Date of Issue	Theme	Denomination	Printer	Quantity	Design	Perforation	First Day Cover Cancellation
18 January 2003	NHL All-Stars, Frank Mahovlich	48 cents	Canadian Bank Note Company, Limited	1 000 000	Designed by Stéphane Huot and based on an illustration by Charles Vinh	12.5 x 13; simulated = simulée	N/A
18 January 2003	NHL All-Stars, Ray Bourque	48 cents	Canadian Bank Note Company, Limited	1 000 000	Designed by Stéphane Huot and based on an illustration by Charles Vinh	12.5 x 13; simulated = simulée	N/A
18 January 2003	NHL All-Stars, Serge Savard	48 cents	Canadian Bank Note Company, Limited	1 000 000	Designed by Stéphane Huot and based on an illustration by Charles Vinh	12.5 x 13; simulated = simulée	N/A
18 January 2003	NHL All-Stars, Stan Mikita	48 cents	Canadian Bank Note Company, Limited	1 000 000	Designed by Stéphane Huot and based on an illustration by Charles Vinh	12.5 x 13; simulated = simulée	N/A
18 January 2003	NHL All-Stars, Mike Bossy	48 cents	Canadian Bank Note Company, Limited	1 000 000	Designed by Stéphane Huot and based on an illustration by Charles Vinh	12.5 x 13; simulated = simulée	N/A
18 January 2003	NHL All-Stars, Bill Durnan	48 cents	Canadian Bank Note Company, Limited	1 000 000	Designed by Stéphane Huot and based on an illustration by Charles Vinh	12.5 x 13; simulated = simulée	N/A

=== 2004 ===
Year of Issue	Player	Denomination
2004	Larry Robinson	49 cents
2004	Marcel Dionne	49 cents
2004	Ted Lindsay	49 cents
2004	Johnny Bower	49 cents
2004	Brad Park	49 cents
2004	Milt Schmidt	49 cents

=== 2005 ===
Year of Issue	Player	Denomination
2005	Henri Richard	50 cents
2005	Grant Fuhr	50 cents
2005	Allan Stanley	50 cents
2005	Pierre Pilote	50 cents
2005	Bryan Trottier	50 cents
2005	Johnny Bucyk	50 cents

== NHL 75th Anniversary Stamps ==
A Prestige Booklet containing three stamp designs of different sporting eras will be issued on October 9, 1992 to mark the 75th anniversary of the National Hockey League. With informative text and illustrations, the 25-stamp booklet covers three outstanding eras of the league's history: first the early years (1917–1942); the six-team years (1942–1967); and the expansion years (1968–1992).

The first stamp shows hockey-related artifacts like an early puck, a stick and a pair of goalie skates. The player is Babe Siebert from the Montreal Maroons. The next stamp displays the crests of the six teams competing between 1942 and 1967. The vignette portrays Claude Provost and Terry Sawchuck. The third illustrates Jacque Plante's famous goalie mask, his last.

The original NHL was founded in November 1917 as a means to disband the old National Hockey Association and discredit Toronto owner Eddie Livingstone. Initially the league boasted five teams, including the defunct and recently resurrected Ottawa Senators. By 1926 it had expanded south, with both a Canadian and an American division. As the game and the league continued to evolve, many changes were made, including the mandatory sweater number in 1930, the goal green light in 1938 and the red line in 1943.

=== Stamp Details ===
Date of Issue	Theme	Denomination	Design	Printer	Quantity
9 October 1992	NHL 75th Anniversary, The Early Years, 1917–1942	42 cents	Les Holloway and Richard Kerr	Ashton-Potter Limited	8 000 000
9 October 1992	NHL 75th Anniversary, The Six-Team Years, 1942–1967	42 cents	Les Holloway and Richard Kerr	Ashton-Potter Limited	8 000 000
9 October 1992	NHL 75th Anniversary, The Expansion Years, 1967–1992	42 cents	Les Holloway and Richard Kerr	Ashton-Potter Limited	9 000 000

== The Series of the Century, 1972 ==
With 34 seconds left in Game 8 of the 1972 Summit Series between Canada and Russia, Paul Henderson scored the goal that gave Canada the 6-5 lead. The detail of the goal includes Phil Esposito intercepting the puck and firing a shot toward the net. By this time Henderson had picked himself up off the ice, picked up Esposito's rebound [and] fired the puck at Tretiak. The Soviet goalkeeper got a toe on the shot but lost his balance as he made the save. Henderson pounced on the rebound and dribbled the puck under a prone Tretiak just as Liapkin reached him.

To celebrate the 25th anniversary of the 1972 Canada-Soviet hockey series and the momentous day in the history of Canada's favourite pastime, Canada Post released "The Series of the Century" commemorative stamp issue. Designed by Charles Vinh of Montreal, the set of two domestic-rate stamps depicts Team Canada's thrilling victory exquisite illustrations, adaptations of photographs taken by Montreal's Denis Brodeur. The first stamp, features the immediate aftermath of the all-important goal. Sports hero Paul Henderson raises his arms in jubilation against the backdrop of the Russian team net. The second stamp captures the team in a congratulatory huddle after the game.

Canada Post also released a pane of 10 stamps with both designs. On top of this, Canada Post issued a pane of 10 stamps with an overprint of two hockey sticks, a puck, and Paul Henderson's signature. The overprinted panes were only available as part of a Canada Post special collector's gift box that contained a Paul Henderson signed hockey puck, poster, sweatshirt with "The Goal" on the front, and the overprinted pane of 10 stamps. The number of gift sets issued is not known, but the issue price for the gift box was $39.95 at Post Offices. The overprinted pane is now valued in the Unitrade Canadian Stamp Catalogue at $100.00, while the boxed set is valued at $125.00. The normal pane of the ten stamps is valued at just over $10.00 Canadian.

=== Stamp Details ===
Date of Issue	Theme	Denomination	Design	Printer	Quantity
20 September 1997	72 Summit Series, Paul Henderson and Yvan Cournoyer	45 cents	Charles Vinh, with computer graphics by Pierre Rousseau, based on a photograph by Denis Brodeur	Ashton-Potter Canada Limited	9 000 000
20 September 1997	72 Summit Series, Canadian Team Members Celebrating	45 cents	Charles Vinh, with computer graphics by Pierre Rousseau, based on a photograph by Denis Brodeur	Ashton-Potter Canada Limited	9 000 000

== Olympic Stamps ==
Date of Issue	Theme	Denomination	Design	Printer	Quantity
15 October 1986	Ice hockey, Calgary, 1988	34 cents	Pierre-Yves Pelletier	Canadian Bank Note Company, Limited	7 825 000
7 February 1992	Ice hockey, Albertville, 1992	42 cents	Designed by Peter Adam and Katalin Kovats	Ashton-Potter Limited	3 000 000
25 January 2002	Women's Hockey, 2002 Winter Olympics	48 cents	Sunil Bhandari and Matthew Wearn	N/A	N/A
12 January 2009	Ice Sledge Hockey, 2010 Winter Olympics	permanent rate	John Belisle and Kosta Tsetsekas	Tullis Russell	N/A
12 January 2009	Olympic Mascot Quatchi, Hockey Goalie, 2010 Winter Olympics	$1.65	VANOC	Tullis Russell	N/A

== Other ==
Date of Issue	Theme	Denomination	Design	Printer	Quantity
16 April 1993	100th Anniversary of the Stanley Cup	43 cents	François Dallaire and Lise Giguère	N/A	N/A
15 September 1999	Hockey Night in Canada: "He Shoots, He Scores"	46 cents	Sheri Hancock, Helene L'Heureux	N/A	N/A
15 September 1999	La Soirée du hockey: Live From the Forum	46 cents	Sheri Hancock, Helene L'Heureux	N/A	N/A
18 May 2018	100th Memorial Cup anniversary	permanent rate	Louis Hebert, Paprika	N/A	N/A

== Commemorative Envelopes ==
Date of Issue	Theme	Denomination	Design
13 April 2001	International Postal Hockey Tournament	47 cents	Bernie Reilander
