= Canadian Olympic stamps =

The first stamps that Canada Post released to commemorate an Olympic event were in commemoration of the 1976 Summer Olympics. This event was held in Montreal. The issue date of these patriotic memorabilia is dated September 20, 1973 and the issue price was 8 cents. It is noteworthy that the issue date coincides with the opening day of the British North America Philatelic Society meeting in Calgary. This is significant because both the design and purpose of this stamp is geared towards the interests of philatelists and all Canadian citizens alike.

Furthermore, this was one of the first released collections but not the last to commemorate the Montreal Olympics. The custom design boasts five interlacing rings, topped with a crown. It also features a symbolic "m". The foundation's underlying, consequential reaction was to provoke the pervading universal brotherhood Olympic spirit. While the "m" signified the three tiered winners'. The podium is symbolic of the glory the winner shall extrude, the chivalrous spirit of a well, earned and contested victory.

In another interpretation, at the center of the logo there is a discernible visual of the Olympic stadium's track. This is where the spectator and team players are united. Unified not only in game spirit but in a frontline visual spectatorship.

== 1976 Montreal Olympics ==
=== 1973 ===
Date of Issue	Theme	Denomination	Printer	Quantity	Design	Perforation	First Day Cover Cancellation
20 September 1973	Symbol of the Montreal Games	8 cents	Ashton-Potter Canada Limited	22,000,000	Alois Matanovic	12 x 12.5	N/A
20 September 1973	Symbol of the Montreal Games	15 cents	Ashton-Potter Canada Limited	11,000,000	Alois Matanovic	12 x 12.5	N/A

=== 1974 ===
==== Semi-Postals ====
Date of Issue	Theme	Denomination	Printer	Quantity	Design	Perforation	First Day Cover Cancellation
17 April 1974	Symbol of the Montreal Games	8 cents plus 2 cents	Ashton-Potter Canada Limited	62 225 000	Alois Matanovic	12.5	N/A
17 April 1974	Symbol of the Montreal Games	10 cents plus 5 cents	Ashton-Potter Canada Limited	26 112 500	Alois Matanovic	12.5	N/A
17 April 1974	Symbol of the Montreal Games	15 cents plus 5 cents	Ashton-Potter Canada Limited	30 715 000	Alois Matanovic	12.5	N/A

=== 1975 ===
==== Water Sports Series ====
Date of Issue	Theme	Denomination	Printer	Quantity	Design	Perforation	First Day Cover Cancellation
5 February 1975	Swimming	8 cents plus 2 cents	Canadian Bank Note Company, Limited	25 300 000	Hal Wallis	13	N/A
5 February 1975	Rowing	10 cents plus 5 cents	Canadian Bank Note Company, Limited	18 250 000	Hal Wallis	13	N/A
5 February 1975	Sailing	15 cents plus 5 cents	Canadian Bank Note Company, Limited	21 750 000	Hal Wallis	13	N/A

==== Sculptures ====
Date of Issue	Theme	Denomination	Printer	Quantity	Design	Perforation	First Day Cover Cancellation
14 March 1975	The Sprinter	$1	Ashton-Potter Limited	10 336 000	Based on a sculpture by Robert Tait McKenzie Designed by Allan Robb Fleming Based on a photograph by Eberhard Otto	12.5 x 12	N/A
14 March 1975	The Plunger	$2	Ashton-Potter Limited	10 320 000	Based on a sculpture by Robert Tait McKenzie Designed by Allan Robb Fleming Based on a photograph by Eberhard Otto	12.5 x 12	N/A

=== 1976 ===
==== Team Sports and Gymnastics ====
Date of Issue	Theme	Denomination	Printer	Quantity	Design	Perforation	First Day Cover Cancellation
7 January 1976	Basketball	8 cents plus 2 cents	Ashton-Potter Limited	16 500 000	James Hill	13.5	N/A
7 January 1976	Vaulting	10 cents plus 5 cents	Ashton-Potter Limited	11 000 000	James Hill	13.5	N/A
7 January 1976	Soccer	20 cents plus 5 cents	Ashton-Potter Limited	11 000 000	James Hill	13.5	N/A

==== Arts & Culture Programme ====
Date of Issue	Theme	Denomination	Printer	Quantity	Design	Perforation	First Day Cover Cancellation
6 February 1976	Communications Arts	20 cents	Canadian Bank Note Company, Limited	11 050 000	Ray Webber	12 x 12.5	N/A
6 February 1976	Handicrafts	25 cents	Canadian Bank Note Company, Limited	9 450 000	Ray Webber	12 x 12.5	N/A
6 February 1976	Performing Arts	50 cents	Canadian Bank Note Company, Limited	9 700 000	Ray Webber	12 x 12.5	N/A

==== Olympic Sites ====
Date of Issue	Theme	Denomination	Printer	Quantity	Design	Perforation	First Day Cover Cancellation
12 March 1976	Place Ville Marie and Notre-Dame Church	$1	British American Bank Note Company	4 520 000	Designed by Jean Mercier and Pierre Mercier	13.5	N/A
12 March 1976	Olympic Stadium and Velodrome	$2	British American Bank Note Company	4 120 000	Designed by Jean Mercier and Pierre Mercier	13.5	N/A

==== Ceremonies ====
Date of Issue	Theme	Denomination	Printer	Quantity	Design	Perforation	First Day Cover Cancellation
18 June 1976	Flame Ceremony	8 cents	Ashton-Potter Limited	38 500 000	Designed by Peter Swan	13.5	N/A
18 June 1976	Opening Ceremony	20 cents	Ashton-Potter Limited	15 400 000	Designed by Peter Swan	13.5	N/A
18 June 1976	Victory Ceremony	25 cents	Ashton-Potter Limited	12 600 000	Designed by Peter Swan	13.5	N/A

== 1976 Summer Paralympics ==
The 1976 Olympiad for the Physically Disabled, lasting from August 3 to 11, marks the twenty-fifth renewal of the International Stoke Mandeville Games, which take place annually in England except for every fourth year, when they move to the nation staging the Summer Olympics.

The site of the competitions will be Centennial Park, a 260-acre (1.1 km^{2}) facility in the Borough of Etobicoke, a part of Metropolitan Toronto. The park contains a stadium, two Olympic standard pools, a gymnasium, a double rink arena, and even a ski hill which will serve as a backdrop for archery, one of the first sports ever introduced to the disabled. The Olympiad will feature, among other events, swimming, track and field, shooting, weightlifting, snooker and table tennis.

This commemorative features a mixed-media painting by Tom Bjarnason, an internationally known Toronto illustrator. He has chosen to portray an archer as the embodiment of skill, strength and confidence, on a background of fresh, spring green, signifying growth and hope.

Date of Issue	Theme	Denomination	Printer	Quantity	Design	Perforation	First Day Cover Cancellation
3 August 1976	Olympiad for the Physically Disabled	20 cents	Canadian Bank Note Company, Limited	12 400 000	Designed by Tom Bjarnason	12 x 12.5	N/A

== 1976 Winter Olympics ==
The 1976 Winter Olympic Games were held in Innsbruck from 4 February to 15 February. The capital of the Austrian province of Tyrol, also hosted the 1964 Winter Olympics. Rolf Harder, the designer of the Innsbruck Winter Games stamp, studied both Fine Arts and Graphic Arts at the academy in Hamburg, and worked professionally in that city before coming to Canada in 1955. He has created a graphic design using the official Innsbruck Olympic Symbol combined with a stylized snow crystal. The blue-grey background represents a cold winter sky and serves to dramatize the five bright colours of the Olympic rings.

Date of Issue	Theme	Denomination	Printer	Quantity	Design	Perforation	First Day Cover Cancellation
6 February 1976	XII Olympic Winter Games, Innsbruck, 1976	20 cents	Canadian Bank Note Company, Limited	11 050 000	Ray Webber	12 x 12.5	N/A

== 1980 Winter Olympics ==
The stamp for the 1980 Winter Olympic Games at Lake Placid, N. Y., was designed by Clermont Malenfant of Design G, Montreal. Using an action shot of a skier, by photographer Dinh Ngoc Mô, the design emphasizes the strenuous physical activity of Olympic winter sports. Canada. Post Office Department. [Postage Stamp Press Release], 1980.

Date of Issue	Theme	Denomination	Printer	Quantity	Design	Perforation	First Day Cover Cancellation
23 January 1980	Lake Placid, 1980, Olympic Winter Games	35 cents	Canadian Bank Note Company, Limited	14 300 000	Designed by Clermont Malenfant and based on a photograph by Dinh Ngoc Mô	13.5	N/A

== 1988 Calgary Olympics ==
Designer Pierre-Yves Pelletier of Montreal uses a stylized, diagonal-screen interpretation of sports photographs as seen on previous stamps issued for the Calgary Olympic Winter Games.

- Anyone with information on the First Issue is welcome to contribute.

=== 1986, First Issue ===
Date of Issue	Theme	Denomination	Printer	Quantity	Design	Perforation	First Day Cover Cancellation
13 February 1986	Olympic Winter Games Site, Calgary, 1988	34 cents	Ashton-Potter Limited	16 500 000	Designed by Pierre-Yves Pelletier	12.5 x 13	Calgary, 13 February 1986, Black

=== 1986, Second Issue ===
The second issue of Calgary Winter Olympic stamps features two of the Olympic sports: hockey, one of Canada's favourite sport, and the biathlon, which is steadily growing in popularity.

Date of Issue	Theme	Denomination	Printer	Quantity	Design	Perforation	First Day Cover Cancellation
15 October 1986	Biathlon, Calgary, 1988	34 cents	Canadian Bank Note Company, Limited	7 825 000	Designed by Pierre-Yves Pelletier	13.5 x 13	N/A
15 October 1986	Ice Hockey, Calgary, 1988	34 cents	Canadian Bank Note Company, Limited	7 825 000	Designed by Pierre-Yves Pelletier	13.5 x 13	N/A

=== 1987, Third Issue ===
The third issue of Calgary Olympic Winter Games stamps features bobsleigh and speedskating.

Date of Issue	Theme	Denomination	Printer	Quantity	Design	Perforation	First Day Cover Cancellation
3 April 1987	Speed Skating, Calgary, 1988	36 cents	Canadian Bank Note Company, Limited	15 300 000	Designed by Pierre-Yves Pelletier	13.5 x 13	N/A
3 April 1987	Bobsleigh, Calgary, 1988	42 cents	Canadian Bank Note Company, Limited	10 700 000	Designed by Pierre-Yves Pelletier	13.5 x 13	N/A

=== 1987, Fourth Issue ===
The fourth issue of Calgary Olympic Winter Games stamps features cross-country skiing and ski jumping.

Date of Issue	Theme	Denomination	Printer	Quantity	Design	Perforation	First Day Cover Cancellation
13 November 1987	Ski Jumping, Calgary, 1988	36 cents	Canadian Bank Note Company, Limited	8 200 000	Designed by Pierre-Yves Pelletier	13.5 x 13	N/A
13 November 1987	Cross-Country Skiing, Calgary, 1988	36 cents	Canadian Bank Note Company, Limited	8 200 000	Designed by Pierre-Yves Pelletier	13.5 x 13	N/A

=== 1988, Final Set ===
The final set of Calgary Olympic Winter Games stamps appears on the eve of the Games themselves. The stamps feature alpine skiing, figure skating, luge and curling. These stamps, and the entire 11-stamp set dedicated to the 1988 Olympic Winter Games in Calgary, were designed by Pierre-Yves Pelletier of Montreal. The images featured were created using a unique diagonal half-tone dot screen on photographs of athletes in action. The screen was specially designed by Mr. Pelletier for the stamp series.

Date of Issue	Theme	Denomination	Printer	Quantity	Design	Perforation	First Day Cover Cancellation
12 February 1988	Alpine Skiing, Calgary, 1988	37 cents	Ashton-Potter Limited	8 192 500	Designed by Pierre-Yves Pelletier	12 x 12.5	N/A
12 February 1988	Curling, Calgary, 1988	37 cents	Ashton-Potter Limited	8 192 500	Designed by Pierre-Yves Pelletier	12 x 12.5	N/A
12 February 1988	Figure Skating, Calgary, 1988	45 cents	Ashton-Potter Limited	10 550 000	Designed by Pierre-Yves Pelletier	13 x 12.5	N/A
12 February 1988	Luge, Calgary, 1988	74 cents	Ashton-Potter Limited	10 912 500	Designed by Pierre-Yves Pelletier	13 x 12.5	N/A

== 1992 Winter Olympics ==
Canada Post Corporation will honour the XVI Olympic Winter Games, being held this year in France, with a commemorative stamp booklet of five se-tenant stamp designs. The stamps are being issued on February 7, 1992 - a day before the Games officially open in Albertville. Five separate sports have been chosen to represent Canada's participation in these Olympic Winter Games. Among the most popular and spectacular, these include alpine skiing, figure skating, ski jumping, hockey and bobsledding.

Date of Issue	Theme	Denomination	Printer	Quantity	Design	Perforation	First Day Cover Cancellation
7 February 1992	Ski Jumping	42 cents	Ashton-Potter Limited	3 000 000	Designed by Peter Adam and Katalin Kovats	12.5 x 13	N/A
7 February 1992	Figure Skating	42 cents	Ashton-Potter Limited	3 000 000	Designed by Peter Adam and Katalin Kovats	12.5 x 13	N/A
7 February 1992	Hockey	42 cents	Ashton-Potter Limited	3 000 000	Designed by Peter Adam and Katalin Kovats	12.5 x 13	N/A
7 February 1992	Bobsleigh	42 cents	Ashton-Potter Limited	3 000 000	Designed by Peter Adam and Katalin Kovats	12.5 x 13	N/A
7 February 1992	Alpine Skiing	42 cents	Ashton-Potter Limited	3 000 000	Designed by Peter Adam and Katalin Kovats	12.5 x 13	N/A

== 1992 Summer Olympics ==
Many of the world's top athletes, including Canada's best, will be competing in Barcelona, Spain from July 25 to August 9 at the 1992 Olympic Summer Games. One of 12 top corporate sponsors, Canada Post Corporation is issuing a booklet of 10 stamps on June 15, commemorating the Canadian athlete's participation. The five stamp designs depict track and field, gymnastics, swimming, diving and cycling.

Date of Issue	Theme	Denomination	Printer	Quantity	Design	Perforation	First Day Cover Cancellation
15 June 1992	Diving	42 cents	Ashton-Potter Limited	3 000 000	Designed by Peter Adam and Katalin Kovats	12.5 x 13	N/A
15 June 1992	Cycling	42 cents	Ashton-Potter Limited	3 000 000	Designed by Peter Adam and Katalin Kovats	12.5 x 13	N/A
15 June 1992	Swimming	42 cents	Ashton-Potter Limited	3 000 000	Designed by Peter Adam and Katalin Kovats	12.5 x 13	N/A
15 June 1992	Track and Field	42 cents	Ashton-Potter Limited	3 000 000	Designed by Peter Adam and Katalin Kovats	12.5 x 13	N/A
15 June 1992	Gymnastics	42 cents	Ashton-Potter Limited	3 000 000	Designed by Peter Adam and Katalin Kovats	12.5 x 13	N/A

== 1996 Summer Olympics, Sporting Heroes Series ==
To mark the centenary of the Olympic Games, and to honour the contribution made by our athletes over a hundred years, Canada Post Corporation is pleased to unveil a new series of five domestic rate stamps featuring Canadian gold medalists.

The new Sporting Heroes series was designed by Mark Koudis of Atlanta Art and Design Inc. of Toronto. His first work for Canada Post, the series features evocative sepia toned photographs of these five prominent medalists with the athlete's name, the event and year of victory prominent in the design. The five rings of the Olympics are faintly visible in the centre of each stamp.

Date of Issue	Theme	Denomination	Printer	Quantity	Design	Perforation	First Day Cover Cancellation
8 July 1996	Ethel Catherwood, High Jump, 1928	45 cents	Ashton-Potter Limited	2 400 000	Designed by Mark Koudis and based on a photograph by Canada's Sports Hall of Fame	13 x 12.5	N/A
8 July 1996	Étienne Desmarteau, 56 lb (25 kg) Weight Throw, 1904	45 cents	Ashton-Potter Limited	2 400 000	Designed by Mark Koudis and based on a photograph by Canada's Sports Hall of Fame	13 x 12.5	N/A
8 July 1996	Fanny Rosenfeld, 100 m and 400 m Relay, 1928	45 cents	Ashton-Potter Limited	2 400 000	Designed by Mark Koudis and based on a photograph by Canada's Sports Hall of Fame	13 x 12.5	N/A
8 July 1996	Gerald Ouellette, Smallbore Rifle, Prone, 1956	45 cents	Ashton-Potter Limited	2 400 000	Designed by Mark Koudis and based on a photograph by Canada's Sports Hall of Fame	13 x 12.5	N/A
8 July 1996	Percy Williams, 100 m and 200 m, 1928	45 cents	Ashton-Potter Limited	2 400 000	Designed by Mark Koudis and based on a photograph by Canada's Sports Hall of Fame	13 x 12.5	N/A

== 2002 Winter Olympics ==
To celebrate the spirit of the 2002 Winter Games taking place February 8–24, 2002 in Salt Lake City, Canada Post will issue four stamps featuring some of the most exciting events of the games. Produced by Bhandari and Plater Inc. of Toronto, the stamp designs reflect the speed, agility and grace of winter sports - as well as the cool crisp colours of their surroundings and the team uniforms.

Date of Issue	Theme	Denomination	Printer	Quantity	Design	Perforation	First Day Cover Cancellation
25 January 2002	Short Track Speed Skating	45 cents	Ashton-Potter Limited	1 250 000	Designed by Sunil Bhandari and by Matthew Wearn, Based on photographs by Patrick McCoy and by Robert McNeil	13.5 x 13	N/A
25 January 2002	Curling	45 cents	Ashton-Potter Limited	1 250 000	Designed by Sunil Bhandari and by Matthew Wearn, Based on a photograph by Michael Burns	13.5 x 13	N/A
25 January 2002	Freestyle Aerials	45 cents	Ashton-Potter Limited	1 250 000	Designed by Sunil Bhandari and by Matthew Wearn, Based on a photograph by Mike Ridewood	13.5 x 13	N/A
25 January 2002	Women's Hockey	45 cents	Ashton-Potter Limited	1 250 000	Designed by Sunil Bhandari and by Matthew Wearn, Based on a photograph by Matthew Plexman	13.5 x 13	N/A

== 2004 Summer Olympics ==
In 2004, the Summer Games of the XXVIII Olympiad will be held in Athens, Greece, home of the first Olympiad revival of the modern games held in 1896, as well as the original ancient games, which are believed to have begun in the year 776 B.C. The 16-stamp pane se-tenant domestic (49¢) issue features both a tribute to women's soccer and, with the marathon, a creative invocation of the games' history. The stamps were designed by veteran stamp designer Pierre-Yves Pelletier, who has designed more than 100 stamps for Canada Post. The second stamp pays homage to the marathon and the history of the games. The marathon was first introduced in the Modern Olympic Games of 1896 in Athens, and was originally a 40-kilometre race from Marathon, northeast of Athens, to the Olympic Stadium.

Date of Issue	Theme	Denomination	Printer	Quantity	Design	Perforation	First Day Cover Cancellation
28 July 2004	Spyros Louis, Marathon, Athens, 1896	49 cents	Canadian Bank Note Company, Limited	2 000 000	Designed and illustrated by Pierre-Yves Pelletier	12.5 x 13	N/A
28 July 2004	Football (Soccer), Our Hope for the Future	49 cents	Canadian Bank Note Company, Limited	2 000 000	Designed and illustrated by Pierre-Yves Pelletier Based on a photograph by Christian Lalonde Photograph retouched by Pierre Rousseau	12.5 x 13	N/A

== 2006 Winter Olympics ==
The spirit of the Winter Olympics is captured in these two stamps, the result of a collaborative conceptual effort by Susan Mavor and Scot Geib of Metaform Communication Design, a design studio based in Vancouver, British Columbia.

Date of Issue	Theme	Denomination	Printer	Quantity	Design	Perforation	First Day Cover Cancellation
3 February 2006	Team pursuit	51 cents	Lowe-Martin Company Inc.	2 000 000	Designed by Susan Mavor and Scot Geib, based on illustrations by Mark Heine and Chi-Ming Yeung	12.5 x 13	N/A
3 February 2006	Skeleton	51 cents	Lowe-Martin Company Inc.	2 000 000	Designed by Susan Mavor and Scot Geib, based on illustrations by Mark Heine and Chi-Ming Yeung	12.5 x 13	N/A

== 2008 Summer Olympics ==
Designed by q30design inc. from Toronto, the stamp features an abstract image of an athlete with hands overhead carrying a flag. The colours of red, white and gold figure prominently on a clean white background.

Date of Issue	Theme	Denomination	Printer	Quantity	Design	Perforation	First Day Cover Cancellation
18 July 2008	The Games of the XXIX Olympiad	52 cents	Lowe-Martin Company Inc.	2 500 000	Designed by q30design inc. based on an illustration by Laurie Lafrance	Simulated Perforation	Golden, British Columbia

== 2010 Vancouver Olympics ==
Date of Issue	Theme	Denomination	Printer	Quantity	Design	First Day Cover Cancellation
January 12, 2009	Innukshuk Logo	Permanent	Tullis Russell	N/A	VANOC	Vancouver, British Columbia
January 12, 2009	Bobsleigh	Permanent	Tullis Russell	N/A	John Belisle, Kosta Tsetsekas	Whistler and West Vancouver, British Columbia
January 12, 2009	Curling	Permanent	Tullis Russell	N/A	John Belisle, Kosta Tsetsekas	Whistler and West Vancouver, British Columbia
January 12, 2009	Freestyle Skiing	Permanent	Tullis Russell	N/A	John Belisle, Kosta Tsetsekas	Whistler and West Vancouver, British Columbia
January 12, 2009	Snowboarding	Permanent	Tullis Russell	N/A	John Belisle, Kosta Tsetsekas	Whistler and West Vancouver, British Columbia

=== Olympic Mascot Stamps ===
Date of Issue	Mascot	Denomination	Printer	Quantity	Design	First Day Cover Cancellation
January 12, 2009	Miga	$0.98	Tullis Russell	N/A	VANOC	Richmond, British Columbia
January 12, 2009	Quatchi	$1.65	Tullis Russell	N/A	VANOC	Richmond, British Columbia

== 2010 Winter Paralympics ==
Date of Issue	Theme	Denomination	Printer	Printing Process	Quantity	Design	First Day Cover Cancellation
January 12, 2009	Paralympic Games Emblem	Permanent	Tullis Russell	Lithography in Five Colours	N/A	VANOC	Vancouver, British Columbia
January 12, 2009	Ice Sledge Hockey	Permanent	Tullis Russell	Lithography in Five Colours	N/A	John Belisle, Kosta Tsetsekas	Whistler and West Vancouver, British Columbia

=== Paralympic Mascot Stamps ===
Date of Issue	Mascot	Denomination	Printer	Quantity	Design	First Day Cover Cancellation
February 12, 2009	Sumi	$1.18	Tullis Russell	N/A	VANOC	Vancouver, British Columbia
