= Queen Elizabeth II domestic rate stamp (Canada) =

Postage stamp

The Queen Elizabeth II domestic rate stamp was a definitive stamp issued by Canada Post, and bearing the image of Elizabeth II, Queen of Canada from 1952 to 2022. Eight versions of the stamp were issued from 2003 to 2019.

== Background ==
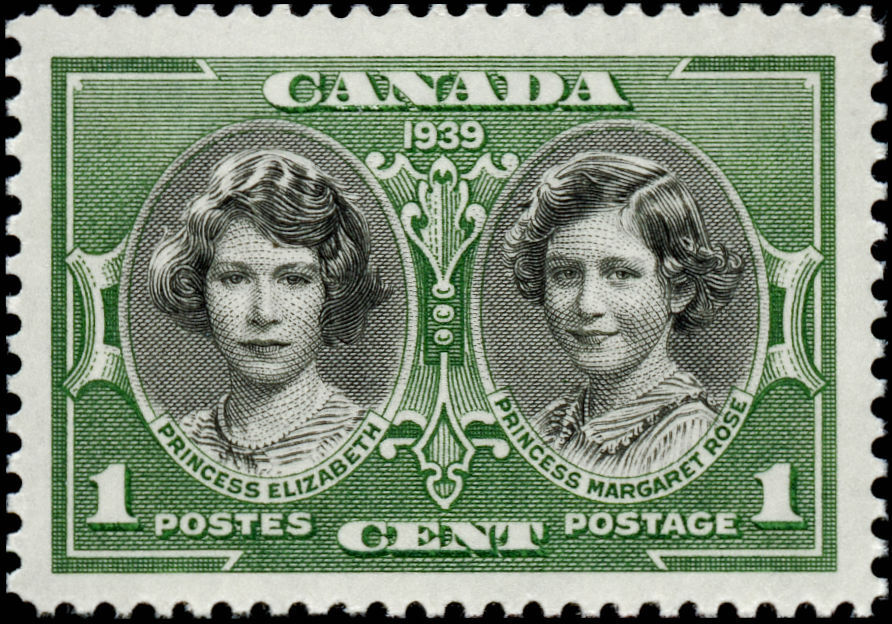
Postage stamp illustrating Princesses Elizabeth and Margaret issued during the Royal visit to Canada with their parents in 1939

Canada has depicted its sovereigns on stamps since 1851; that tradition continues into the present day. Since 1939, the image of Queen Elizabeth II has appeared on 59 stamps issued in Canada, most of them definitives. Canada Post spokesperson Cindy Daoust was quoted as stating that stamps bearing the image of the Queen now "outsells other stamps, ten to one, whether it's a commemorative edition or definitive one."

== Design ==
At Rideau Hall, on December 19, 2003, Governor General Adrienne Clarkson, along with Canada Post President and CEO André Ouellet, and Canadian pop music artist and photographer Bryan Adams, unveiled a 49 cent domestic rate Canada Post definitive stamp bearing the image of Queen Elizabeth II. Canada Post issued this stamp partly at the urging of the Monarchist League of Canada; the definitives were issued as double commemorative-definitives (normally these types of stamps are different) to mark the Queen's Golden Jubilee.

Using a black-and-white photographic portrait of the Queen, taken by Adams during a five-minute session with the Queen at Buckingham Palace, Saskia van Kampen of the Toronto graphics firm Gottschalk + Ash cropped the image, placed the Queen's face off-centre and gave it a sepia tone wash. The informal portrait was a break from the tradition of using official portraits or effigies of monarchs on Canadian stamps. Adams said of his picture as a "glimpse of the real person... The thing that made this photo win out, was her charming smile. It is a one in a million." This stamp was released again on December 20, 2004, as a 50 cent domestic with a blue wash, chosen to contrast with the colour of the previous stamp. As a security measure, but also to provide greater depth of colour, the blue tint consisted of six different colours.

On January 14, 2019, another permanent stamp was introduced, featuring a picture taken in 2017, at Portsmouth, England.

2003; 49 cent stamp

2004; 50 cent stamp

2006; Permanent stamp

2008; Permanent stamp

2009; Permanent stamp

2010; Permanent stamp

2013; Permanent stamp

2019; Permanent stamp

== Non-denominated stamps ==
It was announced on September 19, 2006, that a series of new definitives would be issued in December of that year, as a non-denominated stamp, which will remain valid for domestic first class mail (up to 30g) through any future postal rate increases. The new series included a Queen stamp, which used a colour image taken during her tour to celebrate the centennials of Saskatchewan and Alberta. A "P" in the lower right-hand corner appears instead of a numerical value to indicate it is good for the basic domestic letter rate. The second version of this stamp was issued on December 27, 2007, featuring an image of the Queen during her 2005 visit to Saskatchewan and Alberta.
