= EmailSanta.com =

Christmas-themed entertainment website

emailSanta.com
- The website as it appeared in December 2025
- Available in: English
- Founded: 1997
- Country of origin: Canada
- Creator: Alan Kerr
- Website: emailsanta.com

emailSanta.com is a Christmas-themed entertainment website run by Alan Kerr which simulates emailing Santa Claus. It also provides various other Christmas-themed simulations. Users compose their letter by filling out a blank form, then the website responds with a computer-generated letter which claims to be from Santa Claus. The site also includes a simulated video call for users to "see Santa live", where a pre-recorded video of an actor would be shown prior to the reply letter. From the website's inception, letters which contain pleas for help were directed to a special page, which lists online resources for assistance and counselling helplines. In extreme circumstances, the police have also been contacted.

== History ==
When a 1997 Canada Post workers strike prevented their volunteers from responding to his niece and nephews letters to Santa Claus, Kerr created emailSanta.com as an online alternative. During the first two weeks of the site's existence, emailSanta.com received over 1,000 emails.

In 2011, the website was incorporated in Alberta, Canada as emailSanta.com Inc.

In a 2021 letter to the Search Engine Journal, Kerr noted the declining traffic of his website. However, Kerr reported that traffic increased by 35% following another Canada Post strike in 2024.

== Reception ==
emailSanta.com has received mixed reviews from a variety of sources. Both Kerr and the website have received compliments and praise from TheStreet and Mamamia. It has also been noted for teaching children about the importance of online safety. In 2002, Wired reported that Mummert Consulting, a German market-research company, had been evaluating Santa websites and that "the top site on the list was EmailSanta.com" for two years, specifically citing the personalization that kids receive in response.

=== Criticism ===
On Christmas Eve in 2013, Nicholas Tufnell from Wired stated that "[t]he design leaves a lot to be desired (it's very late 1990s), but it's perfectly functional". He sent an email through the website and noted that "[t]he response [from Santa] is pleasant enough, if a little vague. It may excite children, but we're not convinced." He also remarked that the email came across as "obsequious", while the website's practice of having Santa type out "*wink*" was "unsettling".
