= International Postal Hockey Tournament =

The International Postal Hockey Tournament is an annual event that encompasses teams of postal employees from various countries. The first tournament took place in Sudbury, Ontario in 1977. The early days of the tournament were a means to encourage friendship and fellowship among Canadian postal employees.

In 1984, fundraising became one of the key elements of the tournament. All-star challenges between Canada and the United States were held. On many occasions, special matches between postal employees and former National Hockey League players helped to generate awareness and attract spectators. Funds raised went towards health care research and to assist those with physical or mental disabilities.

The 25th Anniversary of the tournament was held in Montreal from April 13 to April 15, 2001. The 2006 edition of the tournament attracted 76 teams and 1300 players to London, Ontario.

== Commemorative envelope ==
To commemorate the 25th anniversary of the event, Canada Post issued a commemorative envelope to mark the event. The commemorative envelope had a stamp of Jean Beliveau on the upper right-hand corner of the envelope.

Date of issue	Last day of sale	Denomination	Canada Post product number	Design	Quantity	Dimensions
13 April 2001	12 April 2002	1 x 47 cents	341558	Bernie Reilander	12,000	170 mm x 115 mm (horizontal)
