= Canada Post =

National postal operator of Canada

Canada Post Corporation Société canadienne des postes

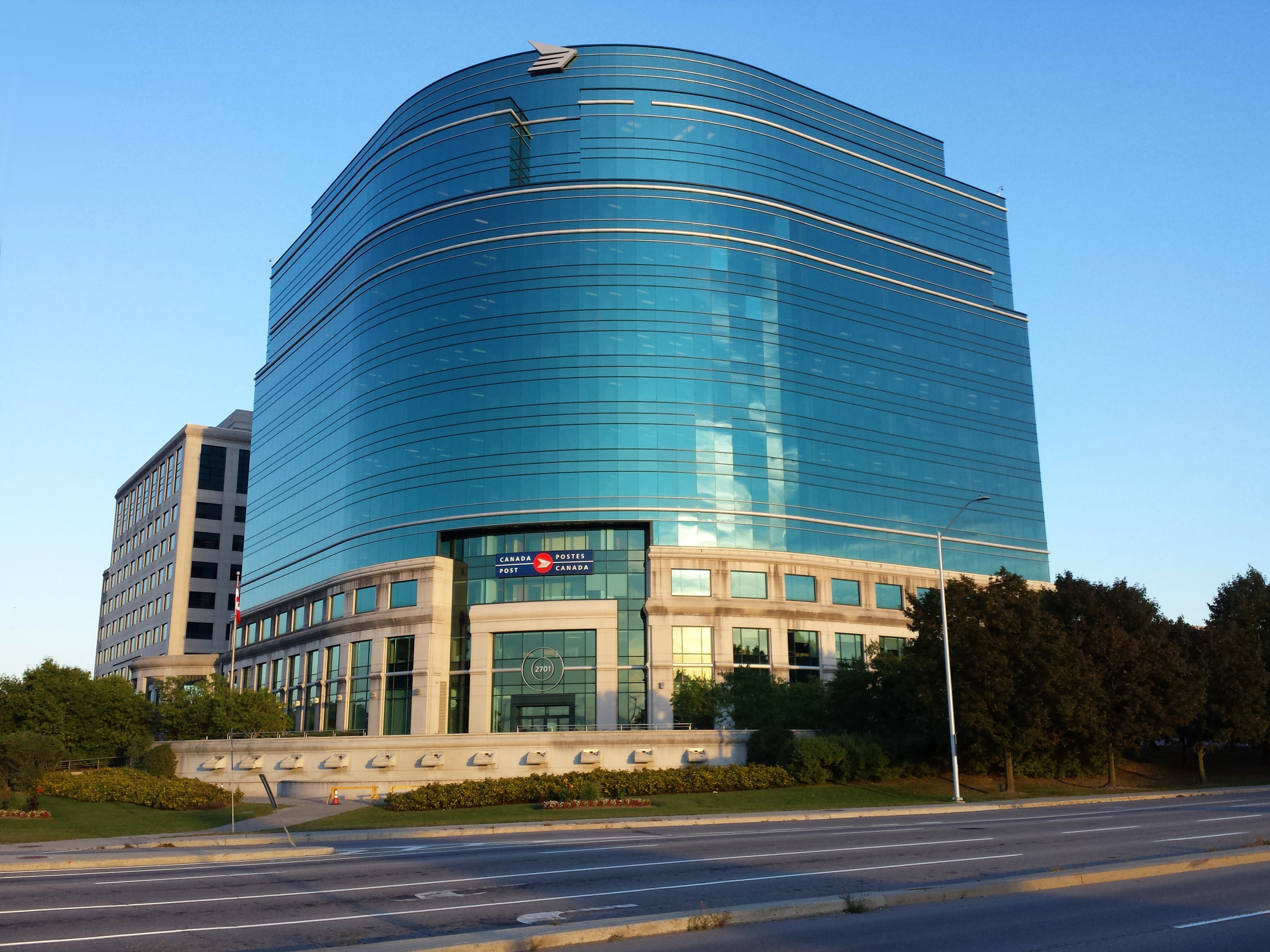
- Canada Post headquarters in Ottawa, Ontario
- Trade name: Canada Post
- Type: Crown corporation
- Industry: Postal service; Courier
- Founded: July 1, 1867; 159 years ago (as Royal Mail Canada)
- Headquarters: 2701 Riverside Drive; Ottawa, Ontario; K1A 0B1
- Key people: André Hudon (chair); Doug Ettinger (president and CEO)
- Services: Courier; Freight; Logistics
- Revenue: $11.69 billion (2024)
- Net income: $−841 million (2024)
- Number of employees: 62,300
- Subsidiaries: Purolator Inc. (91%)
- Canada Post

Corporation overview
- Minister responsible: Joël Lightbound, Minister of Public Services and Procurement
- Website: www.canadapost-postescanada.ca

Canada Post Corporation (French: Société canadienne des postes), trading as Canada Post (French: Postes Canada), is a Canadian Crown corporation that functions as the primary postal operator in Canada.

Originally known as Royal Mail Canada (the operating name of the Post Office Department of the Canadian government founded in 1867), the Canada Post Corporation Act of 1981 abolished the Post Office Department and created the present-day Crown corporation that provides postal service. The act aimed to set a new direction for the postal service by ensuring its financial security and independence.

Canada Post provided service to more than 16 million addresses and delivered nearly 8.4 billion items in 2022 and consolidated revenue from operations reached $11.11 billion. Delivery takes place via traditional "to the door" service and centralized delivery by 25,000 letter carriers, through a 13,000 vehicle fleet. There are more than 6,200 post offices across the country, a combination of corporate offices and private franchises that are operated by retailers, such as drugstores like Shoppers Drug Mart and Rexall (Canada). In terms of area serviced, Canada Post delivers to a larger area than the postal service of any other nation, including Russia (where Russian Post service in Siberia is limited largely to communities along the railway). As of 2022, nearly 3.5 million rural Canadian customers received residential mail delivery services.

Canada Post operates as a group of companies called The Canada Post Group. It employs about 70,000 full- and part-time employees. The Corporation holds an interest in Purolator Courier, Innovapost, Progistix-Solutions, and Canada Post International Limited.

Canada Post (French: Postes Canada) is the Federal Identity Program name. The legal name is Canada Post Corporation in English and Société canadienne des postes in French. During the late 1980s and much of the 1990s, the short forms used in the corporation's logo were "Mail" (English) and "Poste" (French), rendered as "Poste Mail" in Québec and "Mail Poste" in the other provinces. However, English-language advertising also still referred to the corporation as "Canada Post".

== History ==
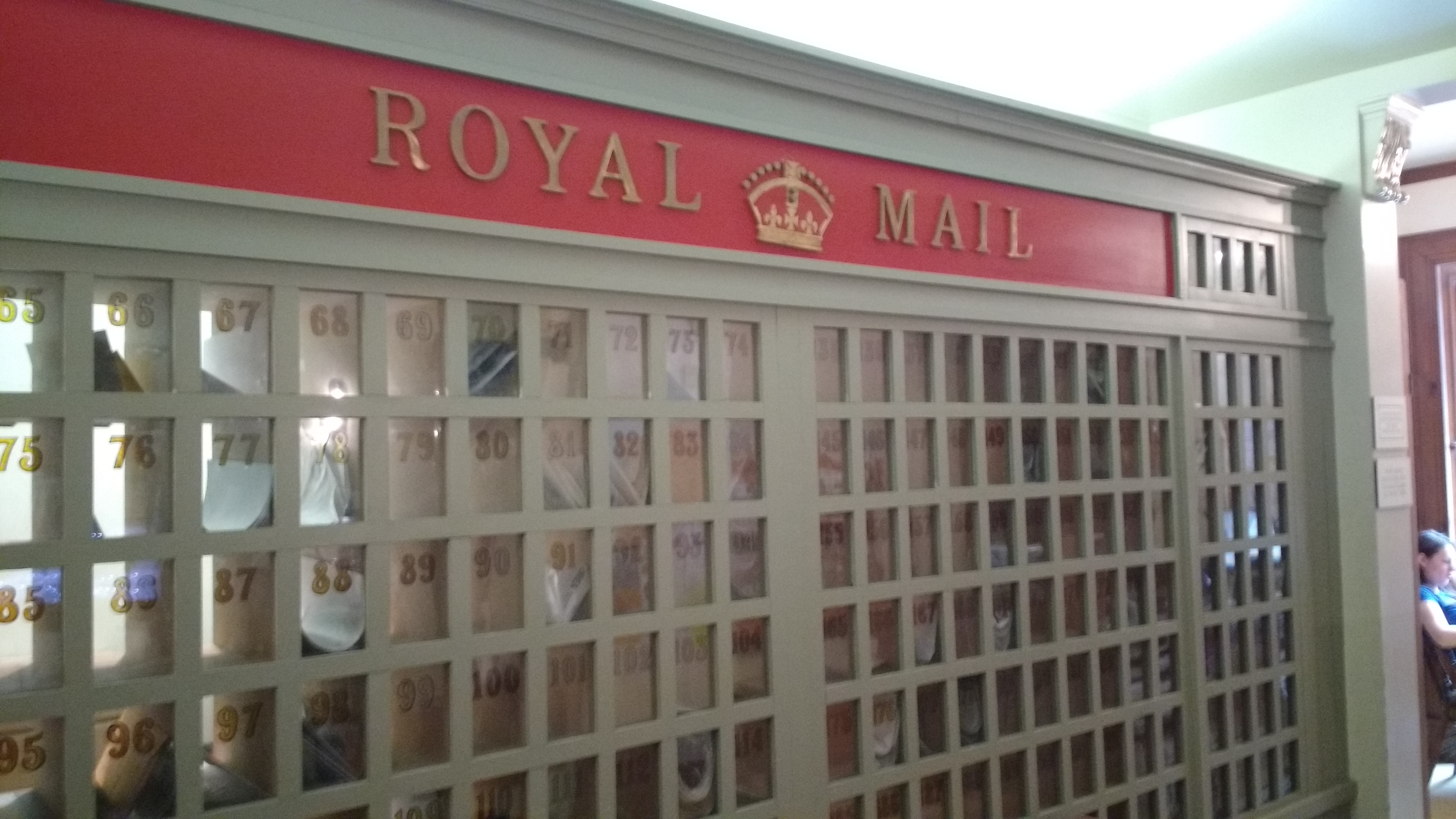
Royal Mail signage at a Toronto post office built in 1833. The British Royal Mail administered the Province of Canada's postal system until 1851.

On August 3, 1527, in St. John's, Newfoundland, the first known letter was sent from present day Canada. While in St. John's, John Rut wrote a letter to King Henry VIII about his findings and planned voyage. Mail delivery within Canada first started in 1693 when the Portuguese-born Pedro da Silva was paid to deliver between Quebec City and Montreal. From 1711 to 1851, post offices in British North America were extensions of the British Post Office's Royal Mail.

In April 1851, control of postal services in the Province of Canada was transferred from the Postmaster General of the United Kingdom to the newly formed Postmaster General for the Province of Canada. Postal responsibilities in the colonies of Nova Scotia, New Brunswick, and Prince Edward Island were also transferred to their local governments that year. The first postage stamp (designed by Sandford Fleming) went into circulation in Canada that same year.

=== Establishment ===
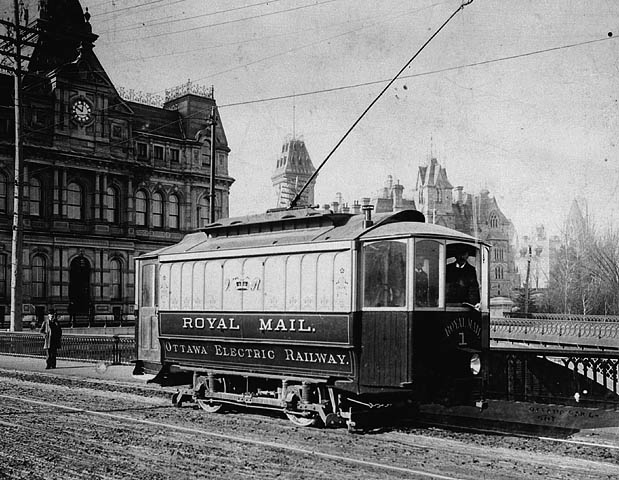
A streetcar used by Royal Mail Canada in Ottawa, 1894

It was in 1867 that the newly formed dominion of Canada created the Post Office Department as a federal government department (The Act for the Regulation of the Postal Service) headed by a cabinet minister, the Postmaster General of Canada. The Act took effect on April 1, 1868, providing a uniform postal service throughout the newly established dominion. The Canadian post office was designed around the British service as created by Sir Rowland Hill, who introduced the concept of charging mail by weight and not destination along with creating the concept of the postage stamp. The new service traded under the name The Royal Mail Canada. It joined the Universal Postal Union in 1878.

Several historical sites related to the history of the Post Office Department of Canada can be visited today. In Ontario, the first Toronto Post Office is still in operation. The site of Scotiabank Arena was once the Canada Post Delivery Building. Also notable are the Vancouver Main Post Office and Post Office in Dawson City, Yukon, both of which are designated as Federal Heritage Buildings.

=== 20th century ===
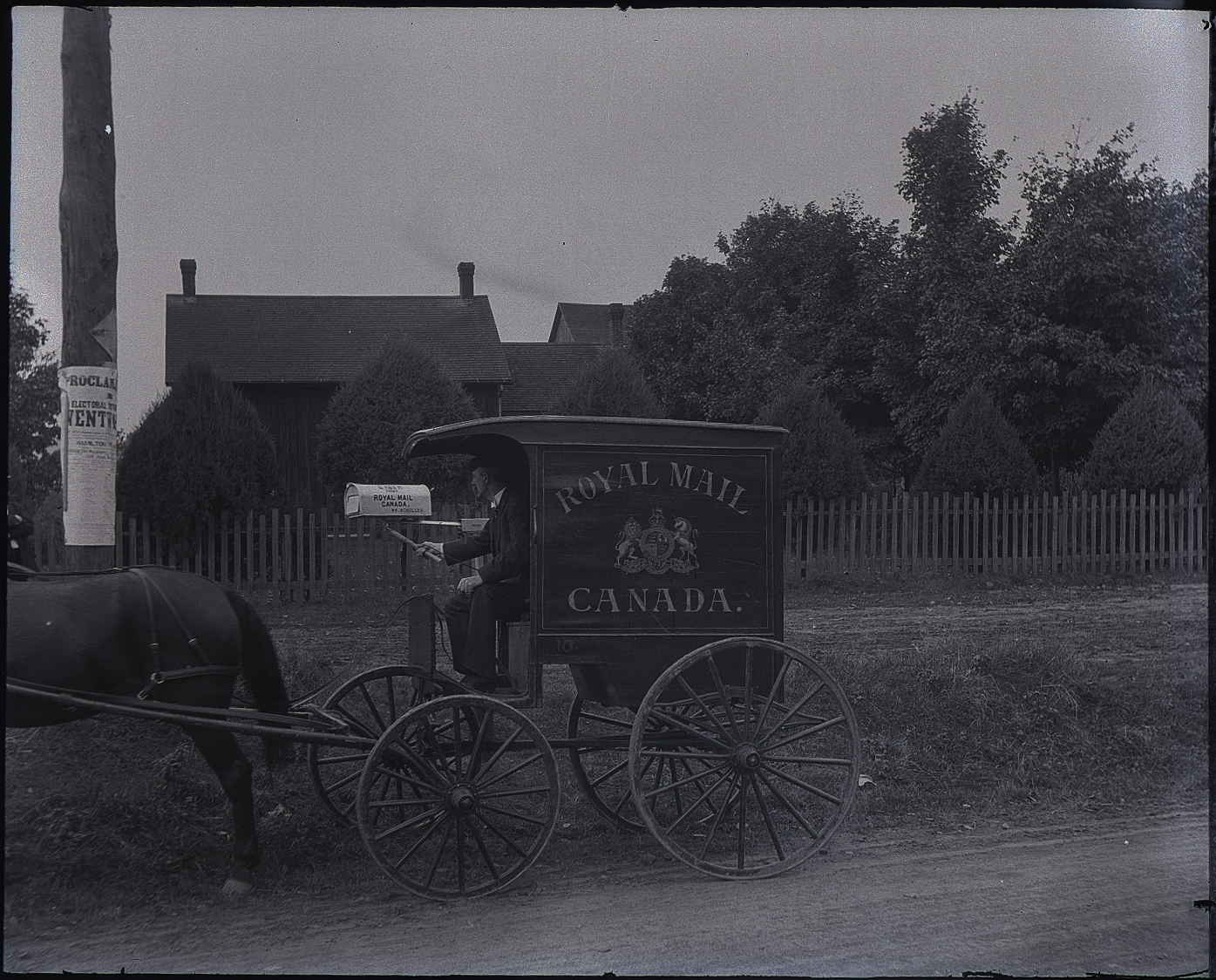
A Royal Mail Canada rural mail cart, October 1908

Prior to rural mail delivery, many Canadians living outside major cities and towns had little communication with the outside world. On October 10, 1908, the first free rural mail delivery service was instituted in Canada. The extension of residential mail delivery services to all rural Canadian residents was a major achievement for the Post Office Department.

The Post Office Department was an early pioneer of airmail delivery, with the first airmail flight taking place on June 24, 1918, carrying mail from Montreal to Toronto. By 1927, airmail service had expanded to Manitoba, and a regular airmail route between Rimouski, Quebec, Montreal, and Ottawa had been established. In 1937, the Post Office provided Trans-Canada Airlines with airmail contract. Daily airmail service between Vancouver and Montreal began in 1939.

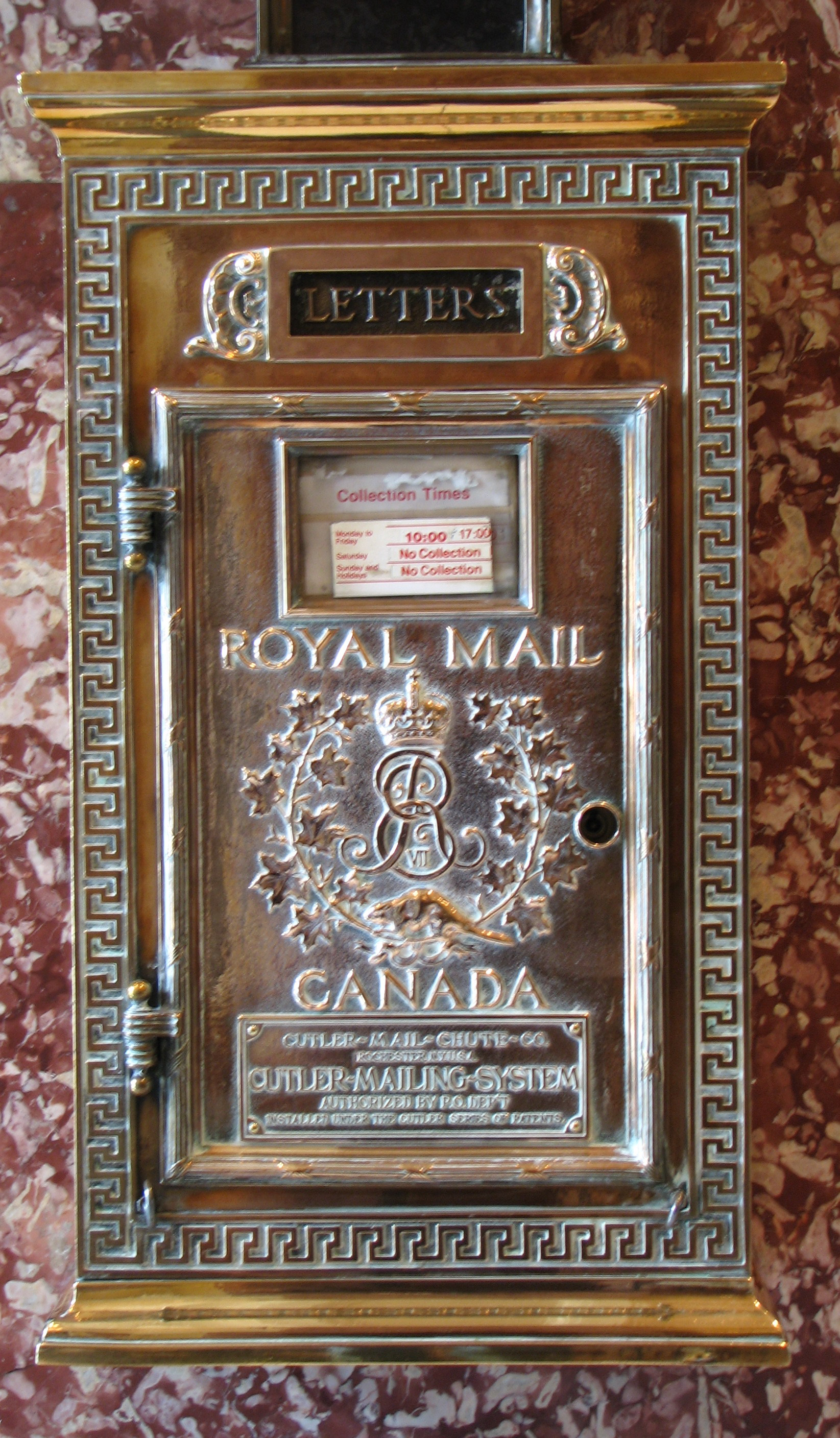
A functional mailbox from the 1900s, bearing the name Royal Mail Canada

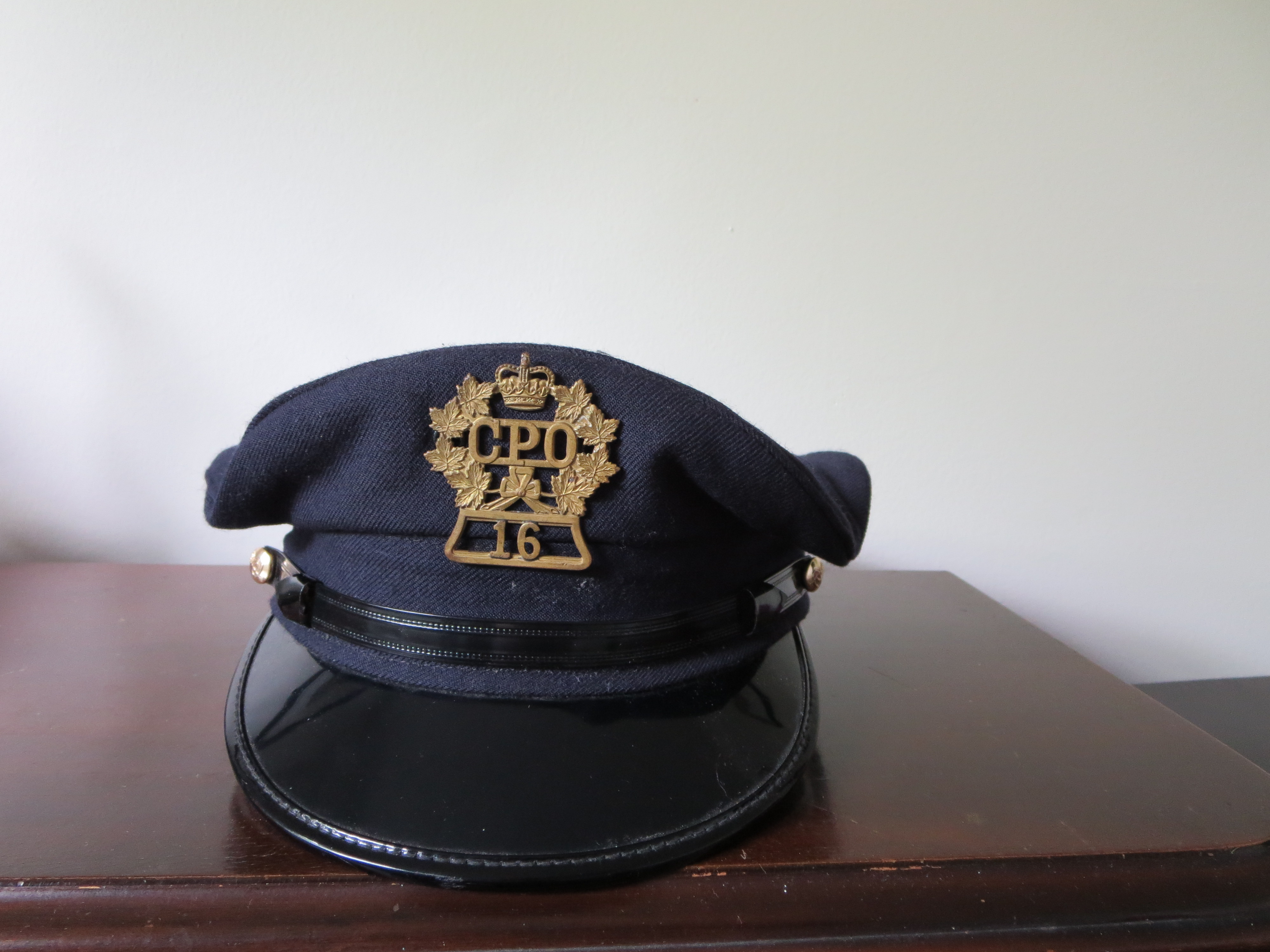
A Canada Post Office letter carrier hat, c. 1970s

The postal service operated under the name Royal Mail Canada until the 1960s, when the brand was phased out.

The Post Office Savings Bank system, an agency created by the April 1868 Post Office Act, was phased out in 1968–69.

==== Crisis and reform ====
The 1970s was a difficult decade for the Post Office, with major strikes combined with annual deficits that had hit $600 million by 1981. This state of affairs made politicians want to rethink their strategy for the federal department. It resulted in two years of public debate and input into the future of mail delivery in Canada. The government sought to give the post office more autonomy, to make it more commercially viable and to compete against the new threat of private courier services.

On October 16, 1981, the Federal Parliament passed the "Canada Post Corporation Act", which transformed Canada Post into a Crown corporation to create the Canada Post Corporation (CPC). The legislation also included a measure legally guaranteeing basic postal service to all Canadians. It stipulates that all Canadians have the right to expect mail delivery, regardless of where they live.

In 1985, Canada Post began phasing in community mailboxes instead of door-to-door delivery in new subdivisions. This was met with legal challenges, requiring an Ontario court to rule that the Canada Post Act does not require door-to-door mail delivery.

By 1989 Canada Post had resolved much of its financial troubles, reporting its first profit since 1957. It continued to operate at a consistent profit from 1995 to 2010.

In 1993, Canada Post purchased a majority stake in Purolator Courier. In 2000, it launched ePost, which allowed customers to receive bills from participating merchants and institutions online for free. ePost was discontinued at the end of 2022.

=== 21st century ===
Minor disruptions to rural mail service occurred in 2006 and 2007, with 5,000 out of 847,000 mailboxes temporarily cut off due to concerns with postal worker safety.

For 2007, 2008, and 2009, the corporation was named one of Canada's Top 100 Employers, as published in Maclean's magazine. In 2008, a strike by Canada Post's administrative worker union—the Public Service Alliance of Canada (PSAC)—caused minor issues in customer service.

==== Attempted restructuring and pushback (2010–2017) ====
In 2010, Canada Post began a seven-year modernization effort called Postal Transformation, investing in greater motorization and automation. As part of this initiative, the duties of letter carriers were combined with those of mail service couriers. This resulted complaints of undelivered mail, increased overtime, work stress, and injuries from fatigue and working past dark.

Locked out Canadian Union of Postal Workers picketing outside a Canada Post sorting depot in Halifax, June 2011

In response, the Canadian Union of Postal Workers (CUPW) went on its first strike against Canada Post since 1997. The following week, Canada Post locked out CUPW members and the Harper government soon passed a back-to-work motion with binding arbitration. This resulted in a new agreement in 2012 with major concessions from the union, including a $4 per hour drop in starting wages and the loss of bankable sick days. Although CUPW successfully challenged the back-to-work legislation in court, the new agreement remained in force, since it was agreed to by the membership of CUPW.

Canada Post posted a pretax loss of $253 million in 2011, partly due to the 25-day employee lockout and a $150 million pay equity class action lawsuit. The period from 2012 to 2016 saw a return to financial sustainability for Canada Post, with a net profit of $266 million.

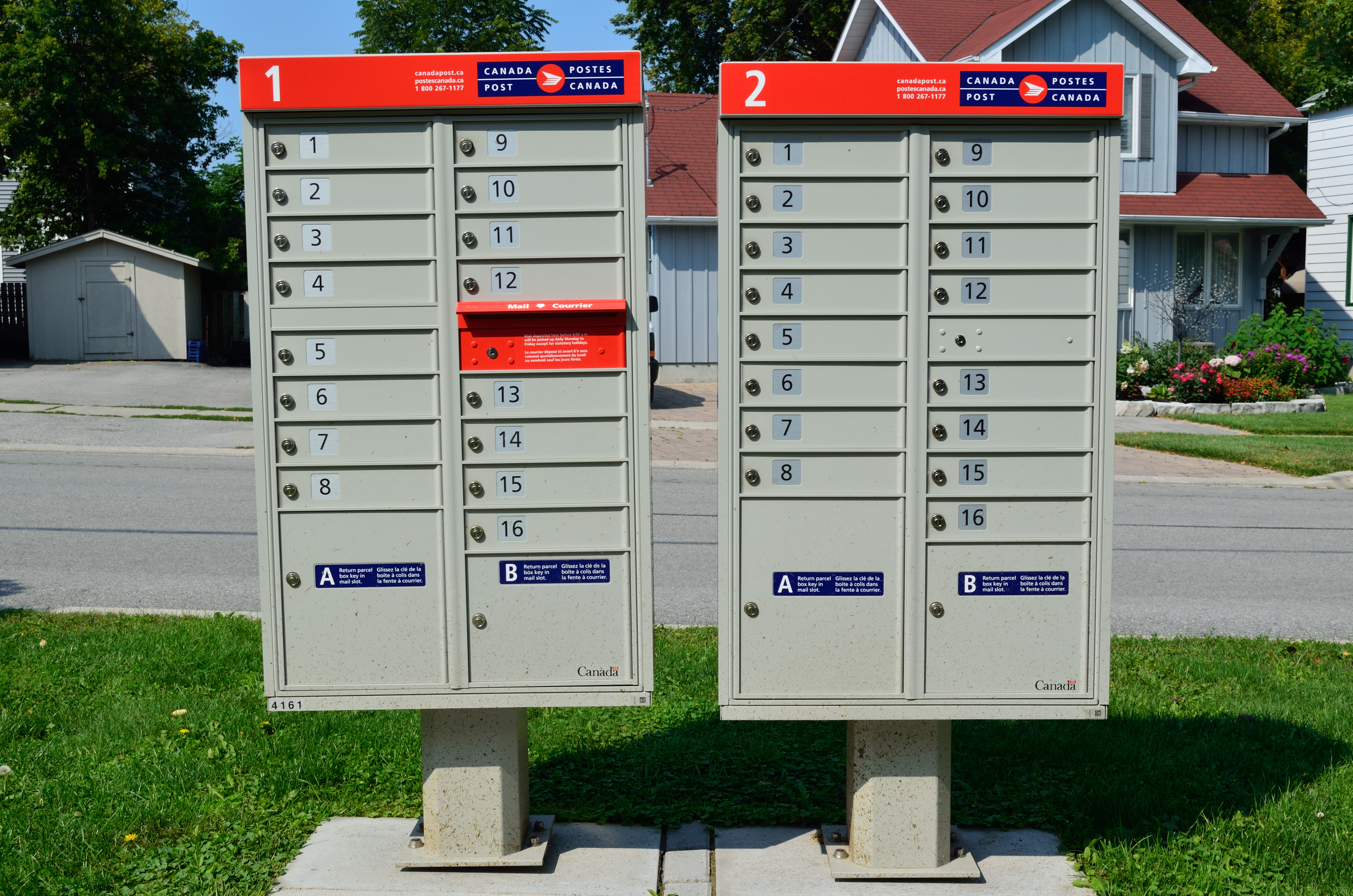
A Canada Post community mailbox in Ontario, 2017

In 2014, Canada Post attempted to phase out door-to-door service in urban centres in favour of community mailboxes, affecting an estimated 32% of Canadian addresses and cutting over 8,000 jobs. The move was widely unpopular, especially for its impacts on seniors and people with disabilities. President and CEO Deepak Chopra became a target of public criticism. In 2015, CUPW filed a federal lawsuit demanding that the roll-out be suspended.

Liberal leader Justin Trudeau promised to stop the phaseout as part of his 2015 Canadian federal election campaign. Following his victory, Canada Post suspended its phaseout. Chopra announced his resignation in summer 2017, leaving three years ahead of his term's expiry date. The Liberal government announced an official halt in January 2018. Canada Post did not reintroduce door-to-door delivery to areas affected before April 15, 2016.

==== Financial and labour crises (2018–present) ====
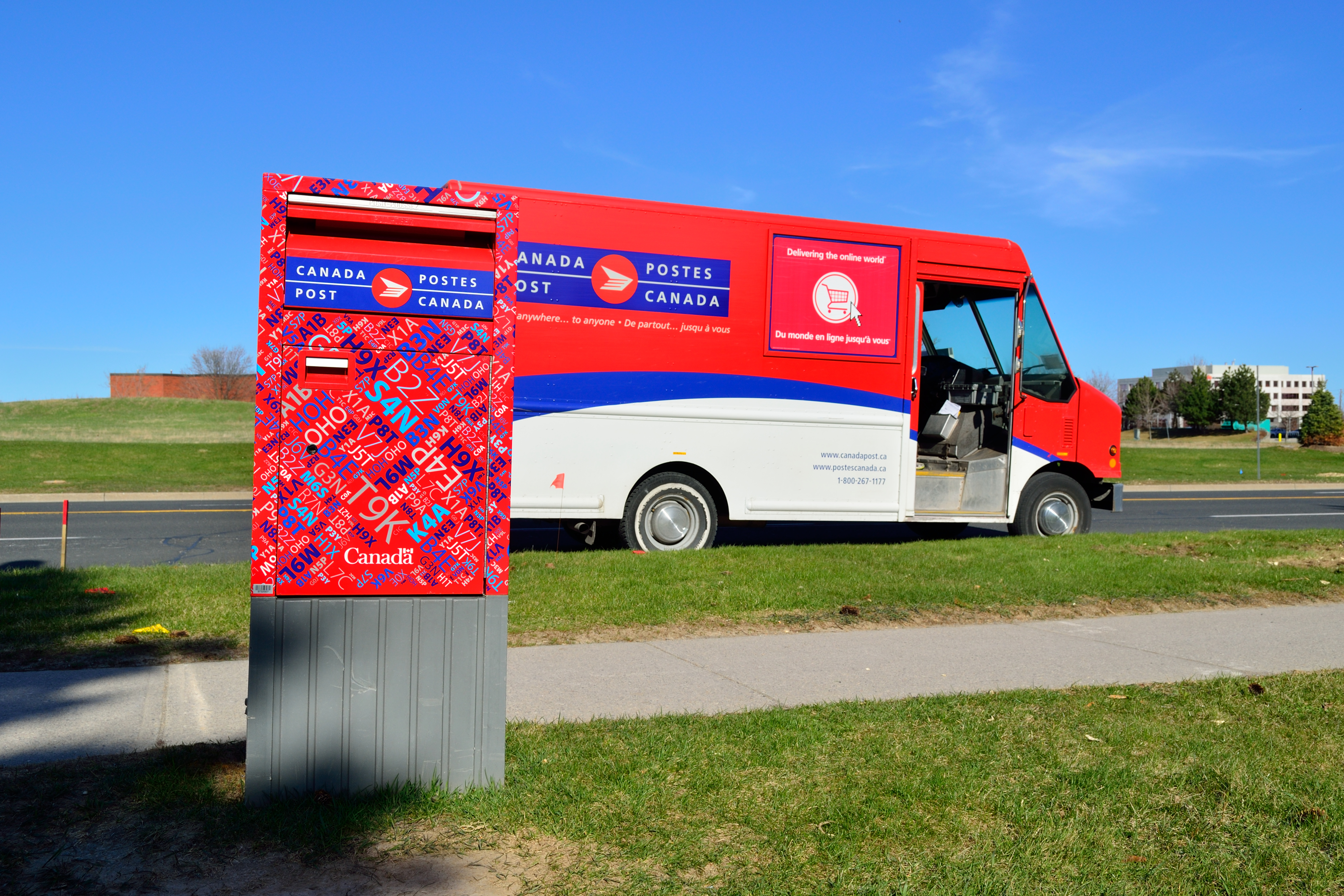
A Canada Post delivery truck and mailbox. The truck features a side panel ad that spotlights the postal service's role in delivering e-commerce goods.

In October 2018, CUPW launched rotating strikes across Canada to negotiate a new agreement with Canada Post. The strikes lasted until late November, when postal workers were ordered back to work by the Trudeau government. This created a 30-day backlog, causing Canada Post to temporarily suspend Canada-bound mail and post $270 million in losses for 2018.

Canada Post struggled to adapt to the growth of e-commerce parcel delivery throughout the 2010s and 2020s, losing more than $3 billion between 2018 and 2024 and racking up over $1 billion in debts. Between 2006 and 2023, its letter deliveries declined from 5.5 billion to 2 billion annually, while parcel revenue rose from $1.6 billion in 2015 to $3.4 billion in 2023. Conversely, its market share in parcel delivery dropped sharply, from 62% in 2019 to 23% in 2023.

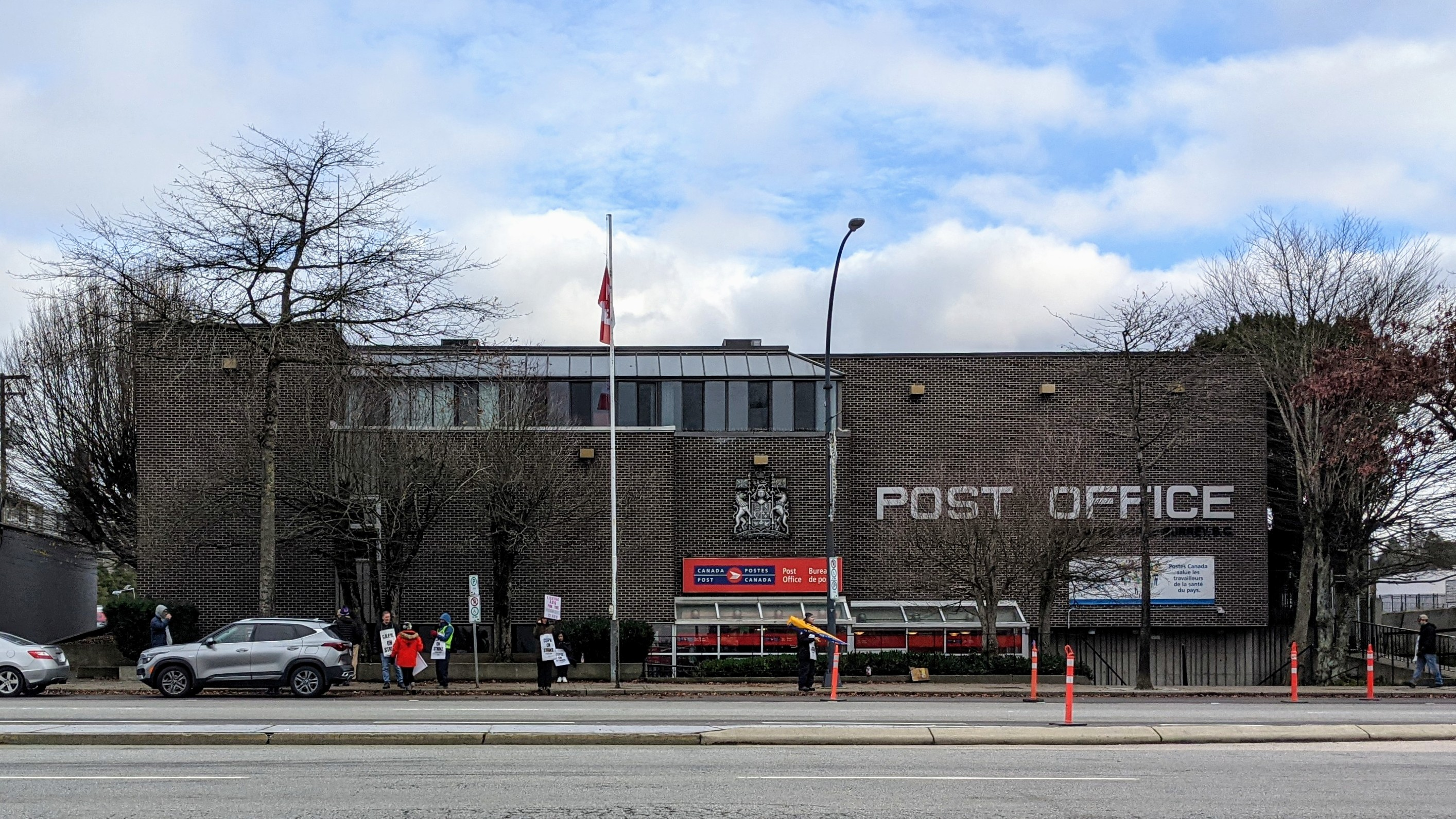
CUPW members picket outside a Canada Post building in Surrey, British Columbia, November 2024

Labour relations and costs were persistent challenges throughout this period. In 2023, Canada Post incurred $4.9 billion in labour costs and employee benefits against $6.9 billion in revenue, with parcel delivery costs of $50 to $60 per hour, exceeding industry averages of $40 to $50. In November 2024, a 32-day strike by CUPW halted operations across Canada.

Canada Post's 2023 annual report indicated it may run out of funds by the end of 2025. Unlike many Crown corporations, Canada Post must sustain itself entirely on its own revenues.

After giving Canada Post CA$1 billion earlier in the year, the Government of Canada announced in September 2025 that Canada Post must reduce costs. The government would allow the Crown corporation to phase out door-to-door service in favour of community mailboxes, impacting roughly four million addresses. It would also allow a reduction in delivery speed of non-urgent mail, allowing the use of surface transport instead of air. The government also rescinded the previous ban on rural post office closures, so as to allow the closure of uneconomic post offices. CUPW immediately went to strike, demanding the Government of Canada reverse its decision. In February 2026, the government gave Canada Post an over $1 billion loan.

== Mail format ==
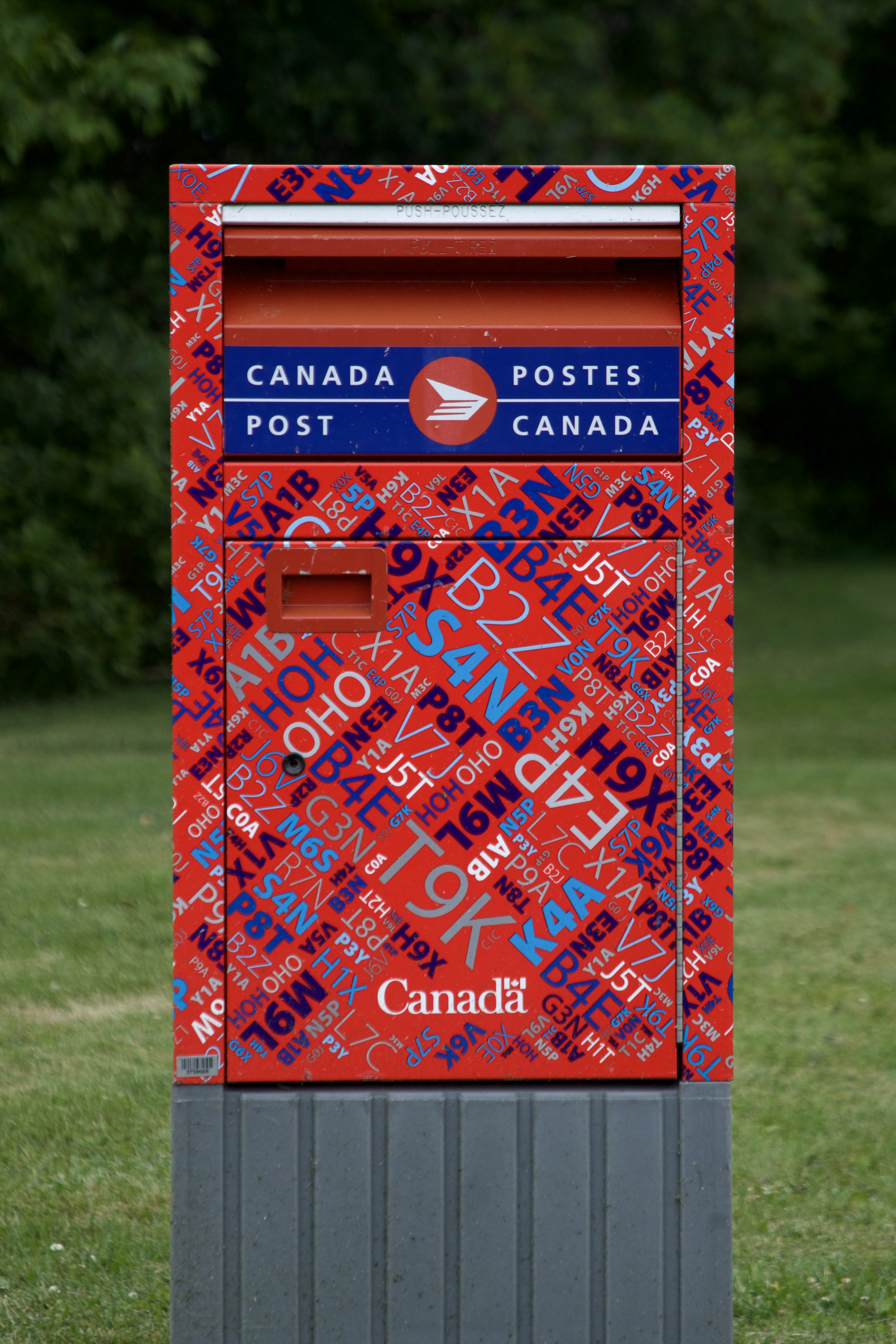
Canadian postal codes on an anti-graffiti/vandalism mailbox

Any letter sent within Canada should have the destination address on the centre of its envelope, with a stamp, postal indicia, meter label, or frank mark on the top-right corner of the envelope to acknowledge payment of postage. A return address, although not required, can be put on the top-left corner or the back of the envelope in smaller type than the destination address.

Official addressing protocol is for the address to be in block letters, using a fixed-pitch typeface (such as Courier). The first line(s) of the address contain(s) the personal name and internal address of the recipient. The second-to-last line is the post office box, general delivery indicator, or street address, using the shortened name of the street type and no punctuation. The last line consists of the legal place name, a single space, the two-letter province abbreviation, two full spaces, and then the postal code. The country designation is unnecessary if mailed within Canada.

Fictitious examples:

JOHN JONES; DÉPT MARKETING; 10-321½ RUE CHARLES OUEST; MONTREAL QC H3Z 2Y7	JOHN JONES; 1234 FRANKLIN AVE; PO BOX 4001 STN A YELLOWKNIFE NT X1A 2B5
JOHN JONES; 1234 7TH CONCESSION; SITE 6 COMP 10; RR 8 STN MAIN; MILLARVILLE AB T0L 1K0	JOHN JONES; GD STN MAIN; WALKERTON ON N0G 2V0

== Major products and services ==
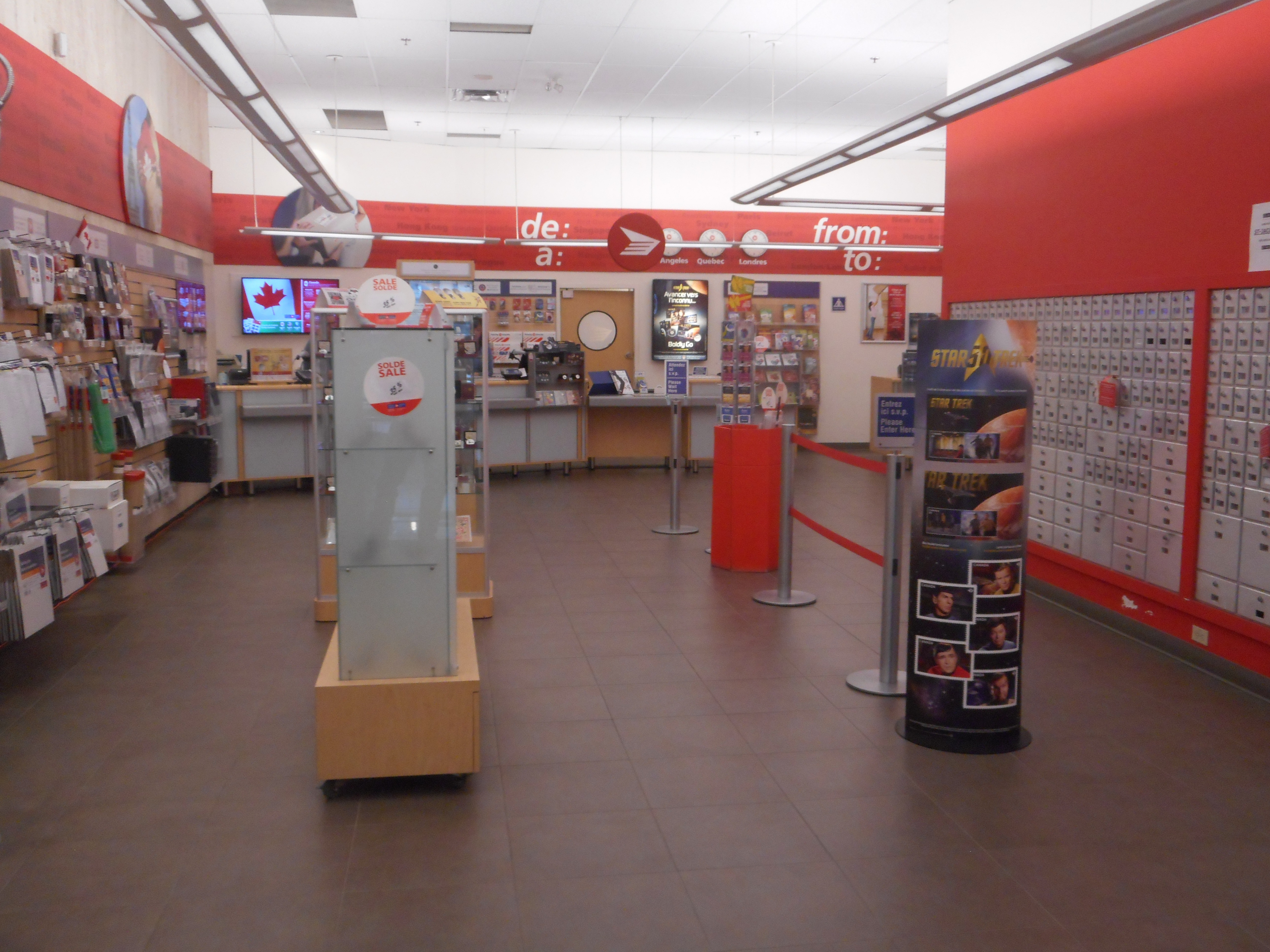
A Canada Post station in Montreal. Products and services are purchased at Canada Post stations.

The Corporation has a directory of all its products and services called the Postal Guide and has divided its range of services into three main categories: Transaction Mail, Parcels, and Direct Marketing.

=== Transaction mail ===
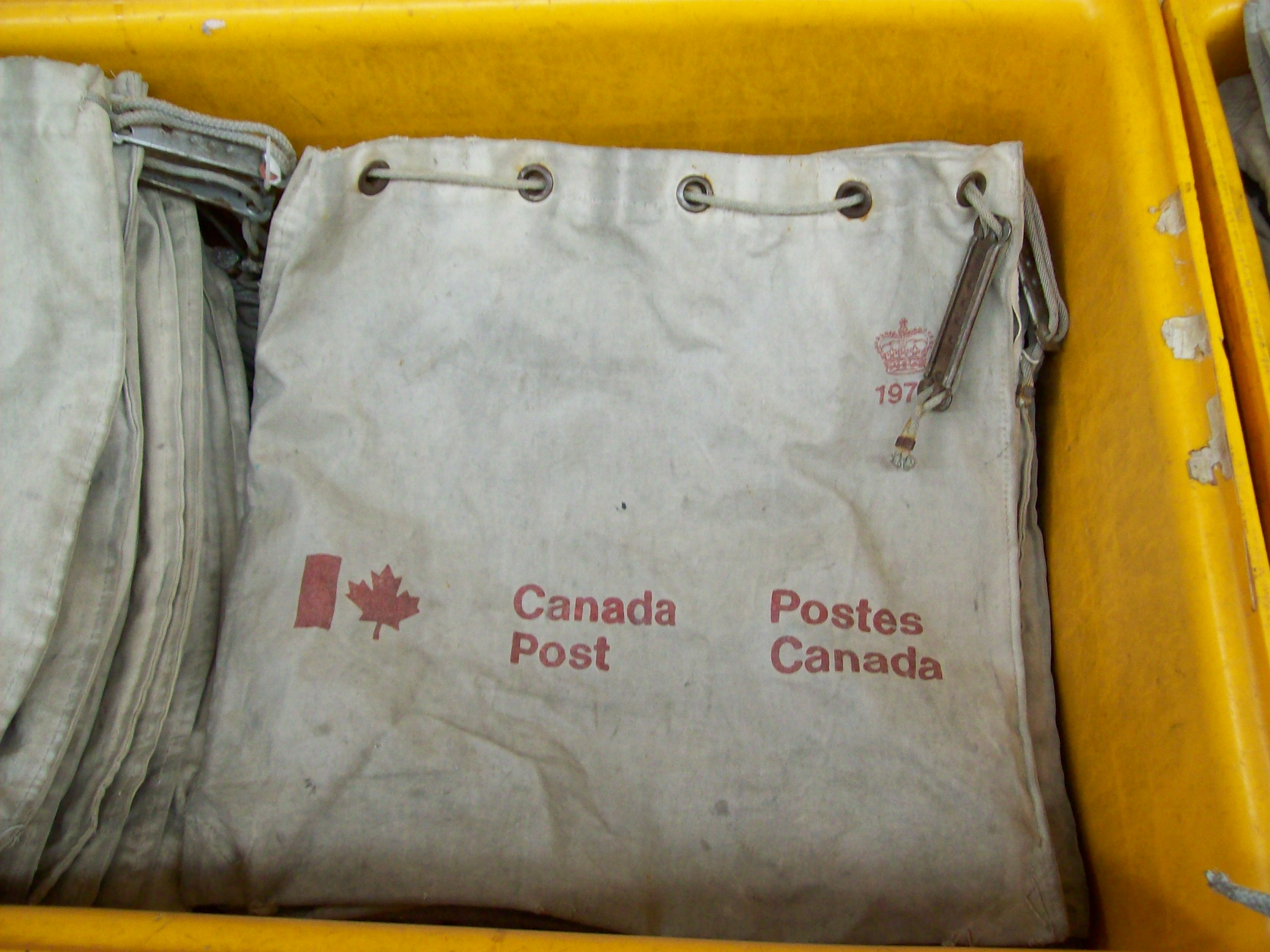
A Canada Post mail bag.

The lettermail service allows the transmission of virtually any paper document. The 2015 to 2018 rate was 85 cents for a standard letter (30 g or less) and $1.20 for a letter between 30 g and 50 g. January 2025 increase was to $1.24 and $1.75 for these rates. Rates usually increase in mid-January of each year; for ordinary letters (30 g or less). The rate was regulated by a price-cap formula, linked to the inflation rate. The Corporation now has a "permanent" stamp that is valued at the domestic rate forever, eliminating the need to buy 1 cent stamps after a rate increase. The rates for lettermail are based on weight and size and determine whether the article falls into the aforementioned standard format or in the oversize one.

The Canada Post website documents standards for delivery within Canada:

- Lettermail
- Priority Delivery Standards

Daily cross-country airmail services were introduced in 1939. Canadian municipal delivery service standards are two days, as seen on the Lettermail Delivery Standards Grid.

Mail sent internationally is known as letter-post. It can only contain paper documents (See "Small Packet" below). For 2025 the rate for a standard letter is $1.75 if sent to the United States and $3.65 if sent to any other destination.

=== Parcels ===
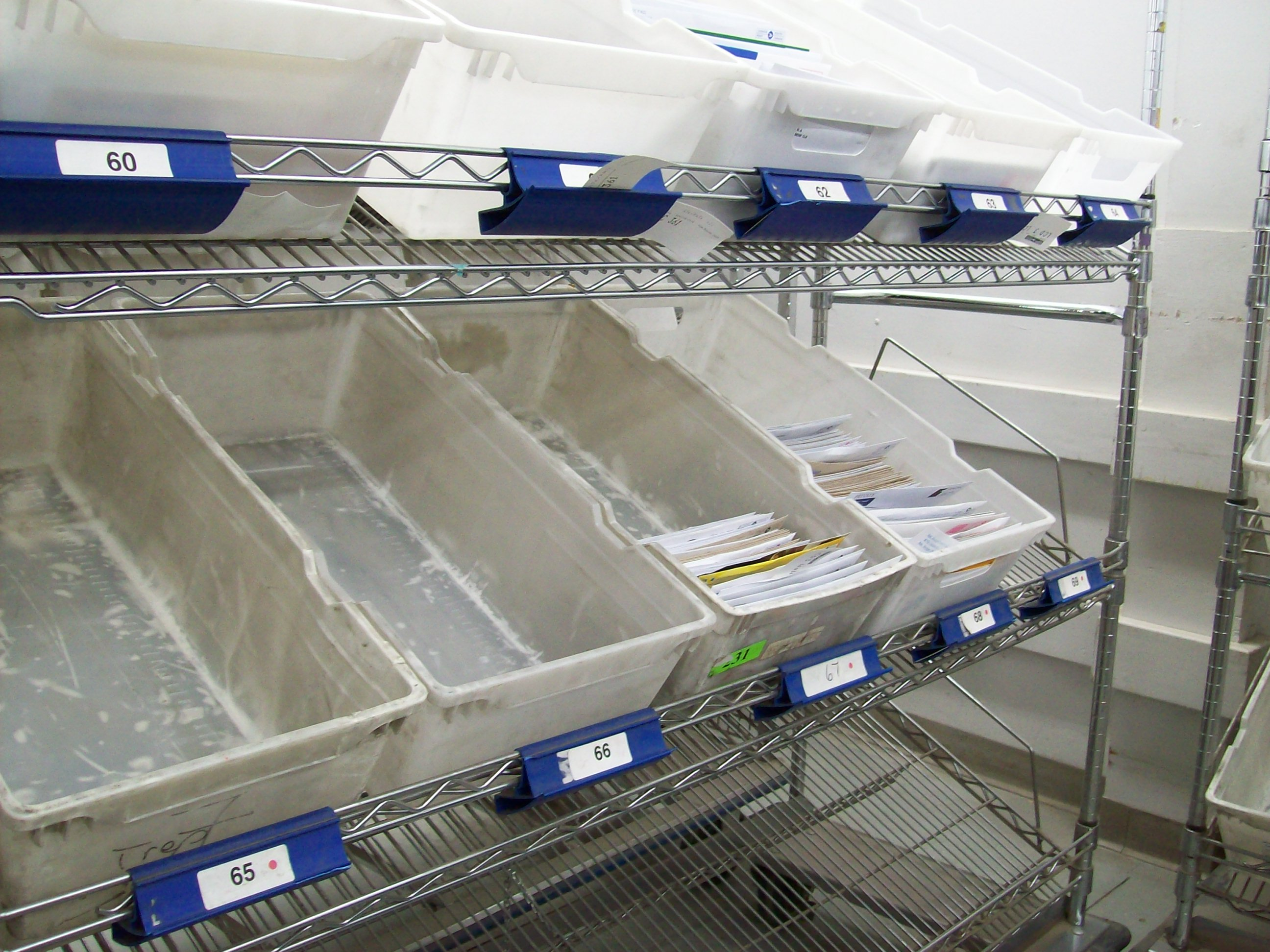
Parcels at a Canada Post mail processing plant

==== Domestic ====
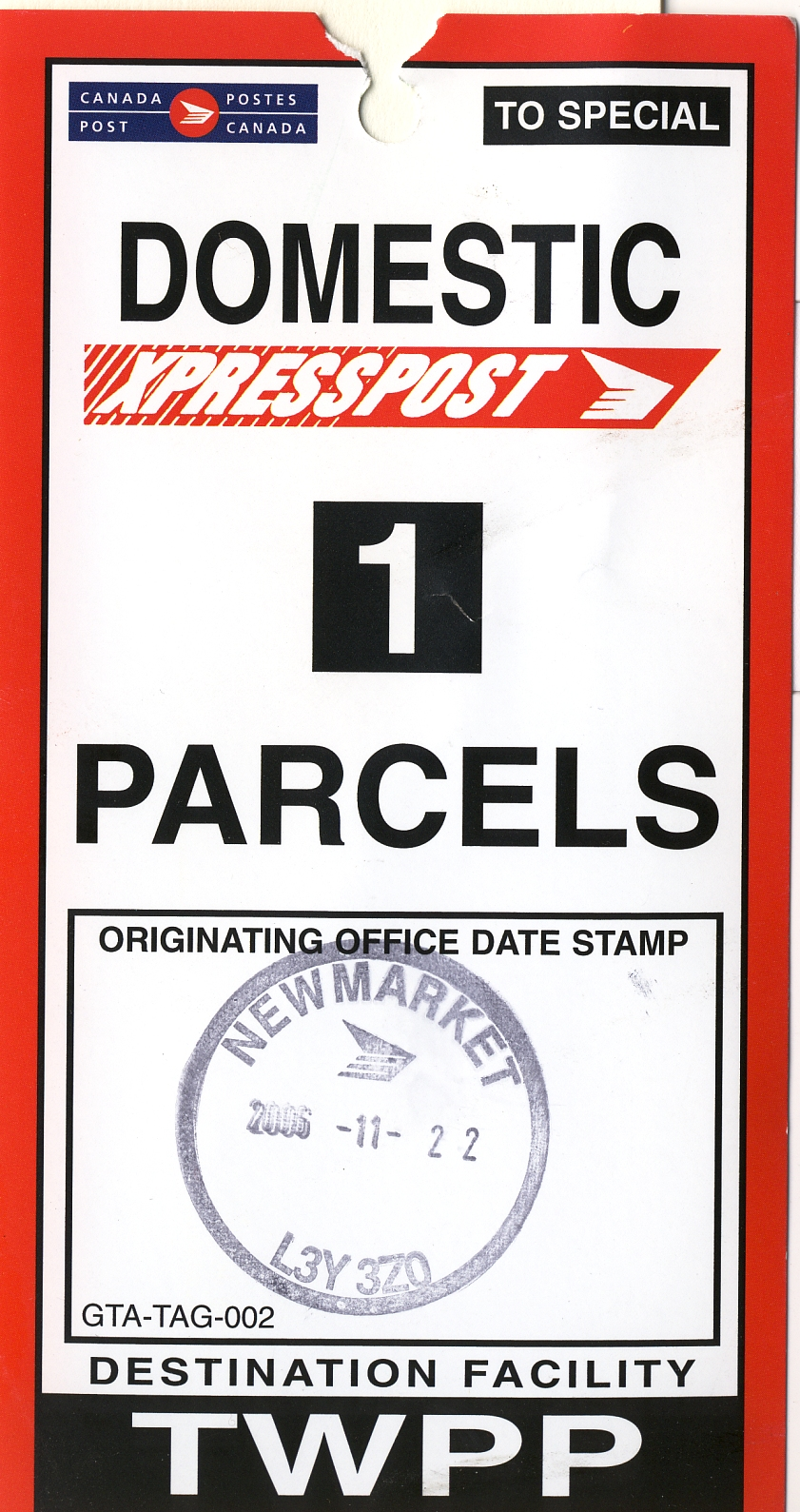
A Canada Post mail bag tag denoting it is for the postal service's domestic Xpresspost parcel service.

Canada Post offers four domestic parcel services. The rates are based on distance, weight, and size. The maximum acceptable weight is 30 kg.

Four domestic parcel services
Name	Annotations
Regular parcel	Expected delivery time ranges from 2 to 13 business days, depending on the destination.
Expedited parcel	Available only to business customers.
Expedited parcel	Delivery time ranges from 1 to 13 business days, depending on the destination.
Xpresspost	Is a service for parcels and documents.
Xpresspost	Delivery time ranges from 1 to 2 business days between major centres, and up to 7 business days to more remote areas.
Priority	Is a service for parcels and documents.
Priority	Provides next business day service between major centres, and service within 7 business days to more remote locations.

==== International ====
===== Small packet =====
- Air and surface services are available
- Maximum weight is 2 kg
- No on time guarantee
- No ability to make a trace or investigation if it is lost or delayed

===== Tracked packet =====
- Available for USA and 31 other countries
- Maximum weight is 2 kg
- No on time guarantee
- Includes $100 insurance

===== Expedited parcel USA =====
- Available for items sent to the United States only
- Despite its name, does not provide any service guarantee
- The maximum acceptable weight is 30 kg
- It is cheaper than the standard international rate
- Handed off to the USPS as Priority Mail

===== Xpresspost-USA and international =====
- Provides speedy and guaranteed delivery to addresses in the United States
- Provides accelerated delivery to certain countries
- Maximum weight is 30 kg (USA) and 20 to 30 kg (depending on the international destination)
- Handed off to the USPS / other postal administrations as Priority Mail Express / EMS

===== International parcel =====
- Air and surface service available
- Provides delivery to countries to which Xpresspost is not available
- No on time guarantee

=== Direct marketing ===
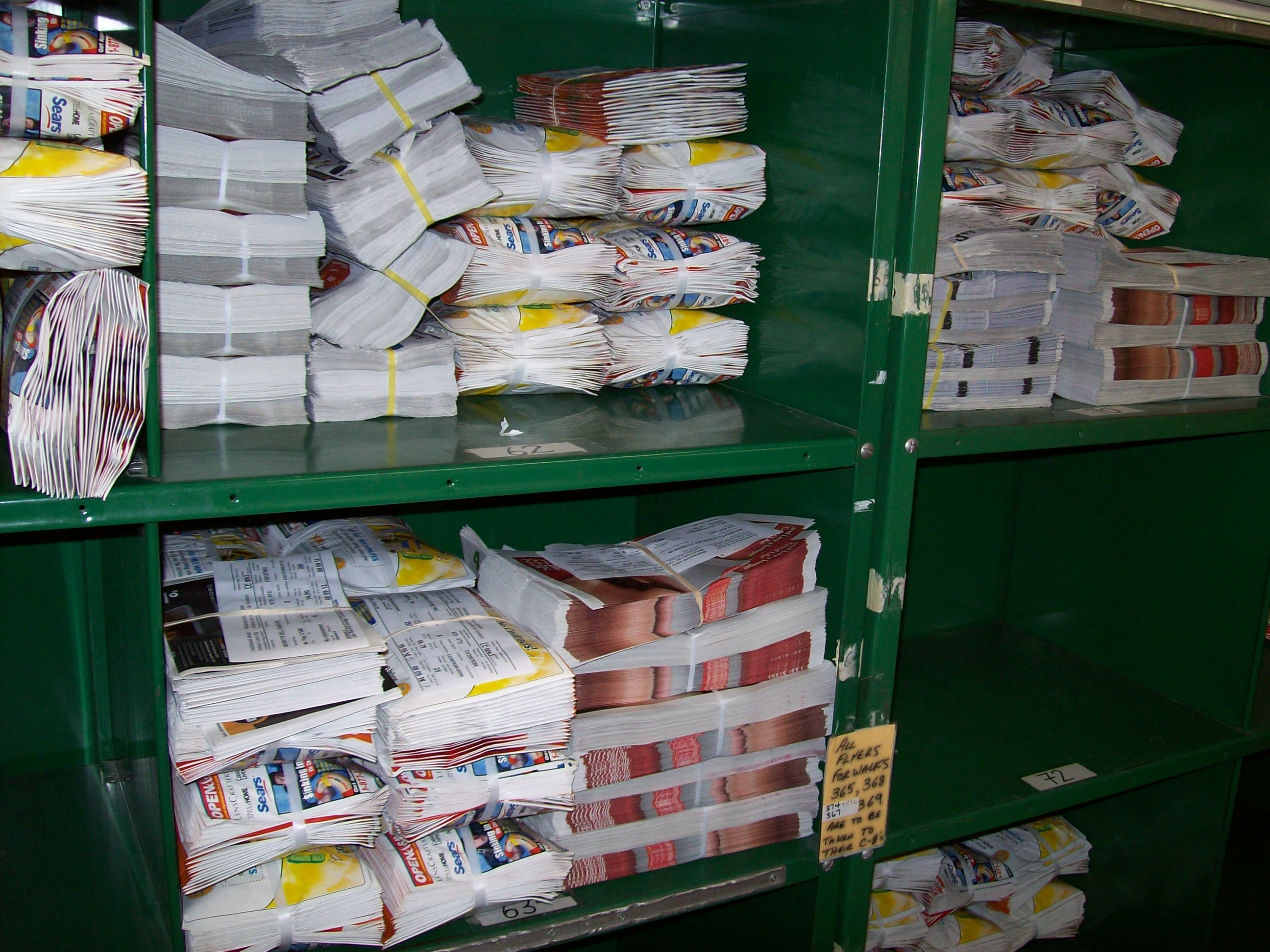
Promotional content to be distributed at a Canada Post mail processing plant.

==== Personalized mail ====
- Promotional mailings targeted to specific residents
- Minimum quantity of 1,000 articles

==== Neighbourhood mail ====
- Consists of printed matter and product samples that are not addressed to specific delivery addresses in Canada, but to specific neighbourhoods or cities

==== Snap Admail ====
On September 22, 2014, Canada Post unveiled Snap Admail, an all-in-one online tool that is aimed to support small businesses in the creation and execution of direct-marketing campaigns.

=== Store ===
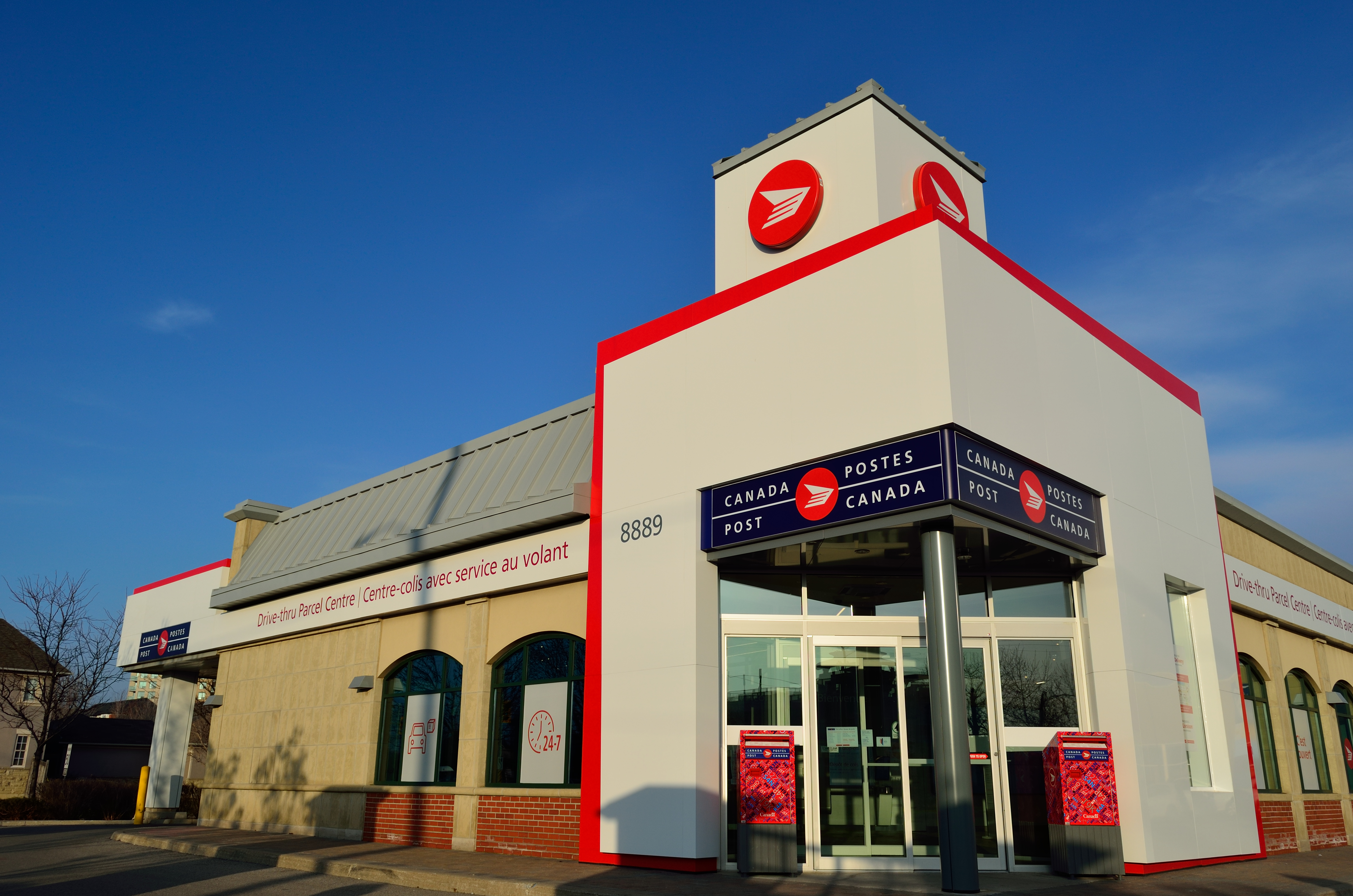
A Canada Post drive-thru parcel centre design.

Canada Post operates a store front that sells a variety of stamps, and postal supplies to the public. The personal shop is focused on nominal postage, shipping supplies, and prepaid envelopes while the collectors shop has a selection of limited edition definitive and commemorative stamps as well as coins.

=== Issue of stamps ===
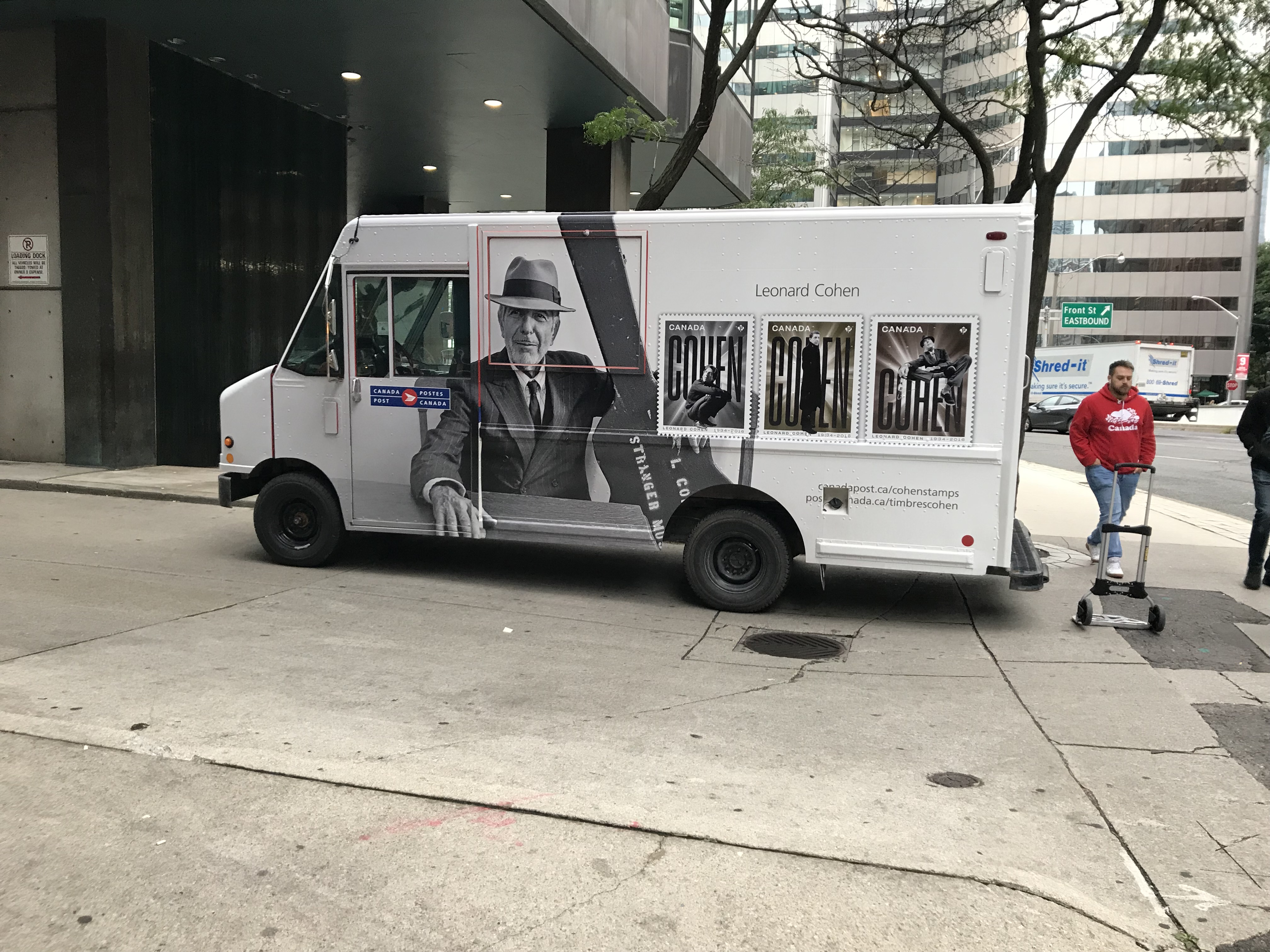
A delivery truck wrapped in an ad promoting a series of commemorative stamps from Canada Post where Leonard Cohen is the subject, 2019.

Although Canada Post is responsible for stamp design and production, the corporation does not actually choose the subjects or the final designs that appear on stamps. That task falls under the jurisdiction of the Stamp Advisory Committee. Their objective is to recommend a stamp program that will have broad-based appeal, regionally and culturally, reflecting Canadian history, heritage, and tradition.

Before Canada Post calls a meeting of the committee, it also welcomes suggestions for stamp subjects from Canadian citizens. Ideas for subjects that have recently appeared on a stamp are declined. The committee works two years in advance and can approve approximately 20 subjects for each year.

Once a stamp subject is selected, Canada Post's Stamp Products group conducts research. Designs are commissioned from two firms, both chosen for their expertise. The designs are presented anonymously to the committee. The committee's process and selection policy have changed little in the thirty years since it was introduced.

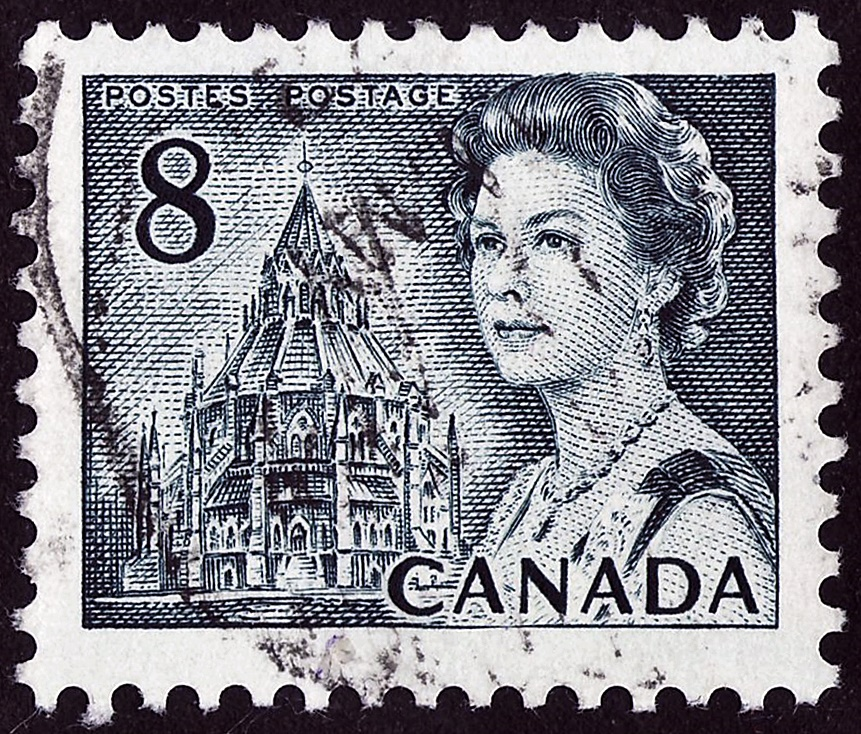
A 1971 definitive stamp of Queen Elizabeth II

Notable stamps include Canadian definitive postage stamps like the Queen Elizabeth II definitive stamps, the Canada Post millennium stamps, and an assortment of ice hockey and Olympic stamps.

=== Tracking numbers and barcodes ===
Canada Post uses 13-digit alphanumeric tracking numbers / barcodes for their pre-printed labels. Barcodes consist of two letters, followed by eight sequence digits, and a ninth digit which is the check digit. The first two letters are the type of service (RN for registered mail, PG for express post envelopes). The last two characters are the letters CA. The check digit ignores the letters and only concern itself with the first eight numeric digits. The scheme is to multiply each of those eight digits by a different weighting factor, (8 6 4 2 3 5 9 7). Add up the total of all of these multiplications and divide by 11. The remainder after dividing by 11 gives a number from 0 to 10. Subtracting this from 11 gives a number from 1 to 11. That result is the check digit, except in the two cases where it is 10 or 11. If 10, it is then changed to a 0, and if 11, it is changed to a 5. The check digit may be used to verify if a barcode scan is correct, or if a manual entry of the barcode is correct. The system of barcode digit checking is referred to as Modulo 11 or Modulus 11 digit calculation.

Canada Post uses 16-digit numeric tracking numbers / barcodes for parcels that originate from a Canada Post post office. The first seven digits are the reference numbers for the specific post office that the package originated. A Modulus 10 digit calculation is used to verify that the barcode has been read correctly, also referred to as the Luhn algorithm. USPS and Canada Post both use the same system to verify the barcodes, with a difference that USPS uses a 20-digit numeric tracking number. These types of barcodes are referred to as GS1-128.

== Organization and labour relations ==
Unlike some Crown corporations, Canada Post is solely sustained through its profits. Many of its business practices require federal approval, including its corporate plan and postage fees.

=== Presidents and CEOs ===
In 1981, Canada Post became a Crown Corporation with a President and CEO.

President and CEOs of Canada Post
Years	Name	Remarks
1981–1985	Michael Warren	Appointed on the advice of Pierre Trudeau.
1986–1992	Donald Harley Lander	Appointed on the advice of Brian Mulroney.
1993–1998	Georges Clermont	Appointed on the advice of Kim Campbell.
1999–2004	André Ouellet	Appointed on the advice of Jean Chretien. Former Postmaster General.
2004–2010	Moya Greene	Appointed on the advice of Paul Martin.
2010–2011	Stewart Bacon	Appointed interim CEO on the advice of Stephen Harper following Greene's departure.
2011–2018	Deepak Chopra	Appointed on the advice of Stephen Harper.
2018– 2019	Jessica McDonald	Interim appointment by the board of directors.
2019–present	Doug Ettinger	

=== Ombudsman ===
The Office of the Ombudsman at Canada Post was created in October 1997 as a result of the 1995 Canada Post Mandate Review conducted by an Advisory Panel appointed by the Canadian government.

The Ombudsman is the final appeal authority in resolving postal service complaints. If a complaint is not resolved to the customer's satisfaction by Canada Post, the customer can appeal to the Ombudsman. Although the Ombudsman has no legislative power over the Corporation, the recommendations that the office makes to Canada Post can help improve company processes, amend policies and reinforce compliance with procedures.

The Ombudsman is independent of Canada Post staff and management, reporting directly to the chairman of the board of directors. Mrs. Francine Conn was appointed on July 11, 2011, as the fourth and current Ombudsman at Canada Post. The services offered by the Office of the Ombudsman are free of charge.

=== Labour relations ===
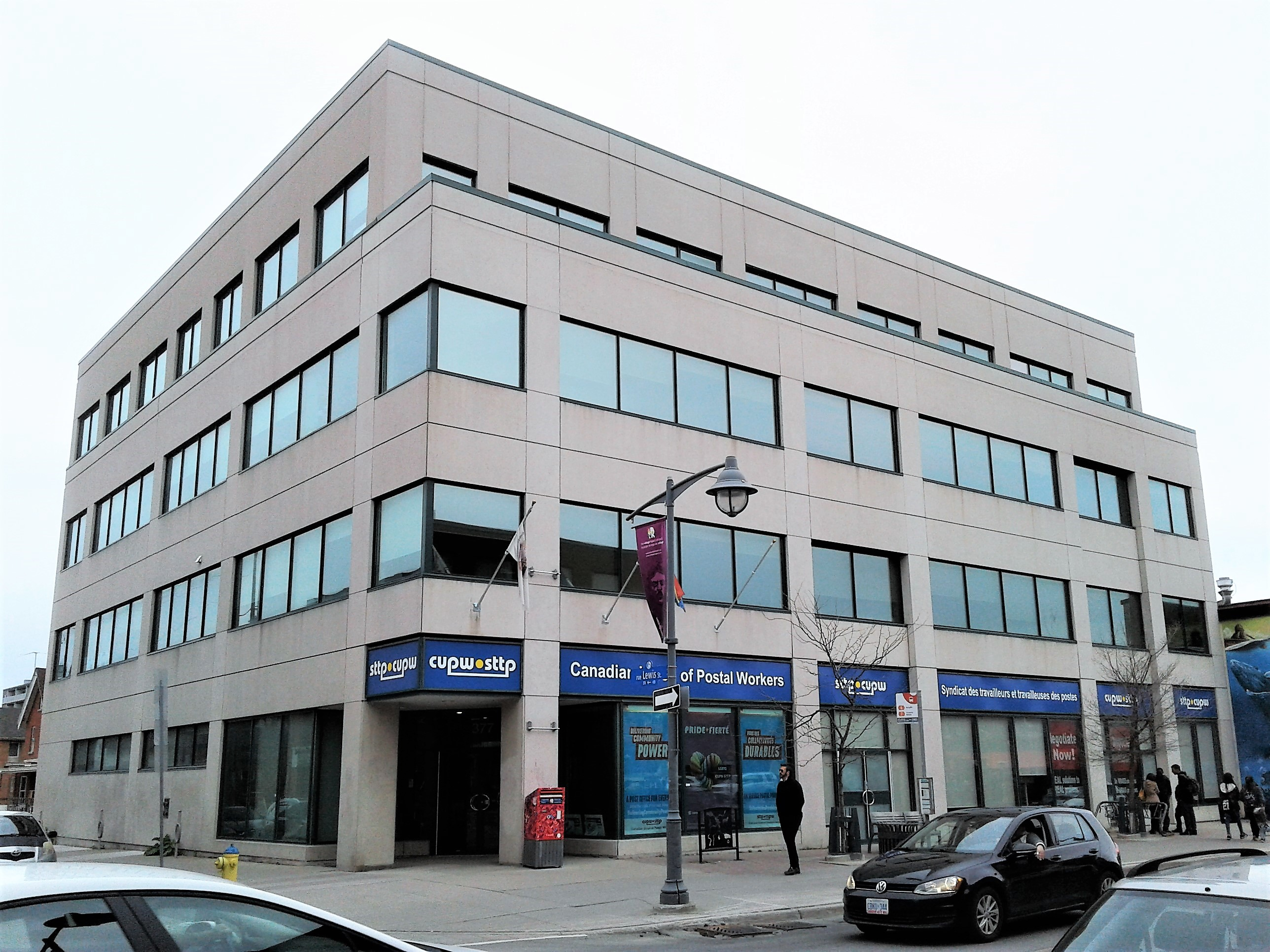
The building which houses the headquarters for the Canadian Union of Postal Workers in Ottawa.

Canada Post has a history of troubled labour relations with its trade unions, particularly the Canadian Union of Postal Workers (CUPW) and the Letter Carriers Union of Canada (which merged with CUPW in 1989), culminating in periodic strike action that has halted mail service in Canada on different occasions. There were at least 19 strikes, lockouts, and walkouts between 1965 and 1997, including several wildcat strikes. A number of these strikes after the 1970s were countered with strikebreakers and back-to-work legislation from the Canadian parliament.

Nearly all Canada Post employees who are not in the CUPW belong to one of three smaller trade unions. The Canadian Postmasters and Assistants Association covers 12,000 rural workers, the Association of Postal Officials of Canada has 3,400 supervisors and the Union of Postal Communications Employees represents 2,600 technical workers.

In 2004, rural route contractors became employees of Canada Post and joined the Canadian Union of Postal Workers (CUPW).

== Letters to Santa Claus ==
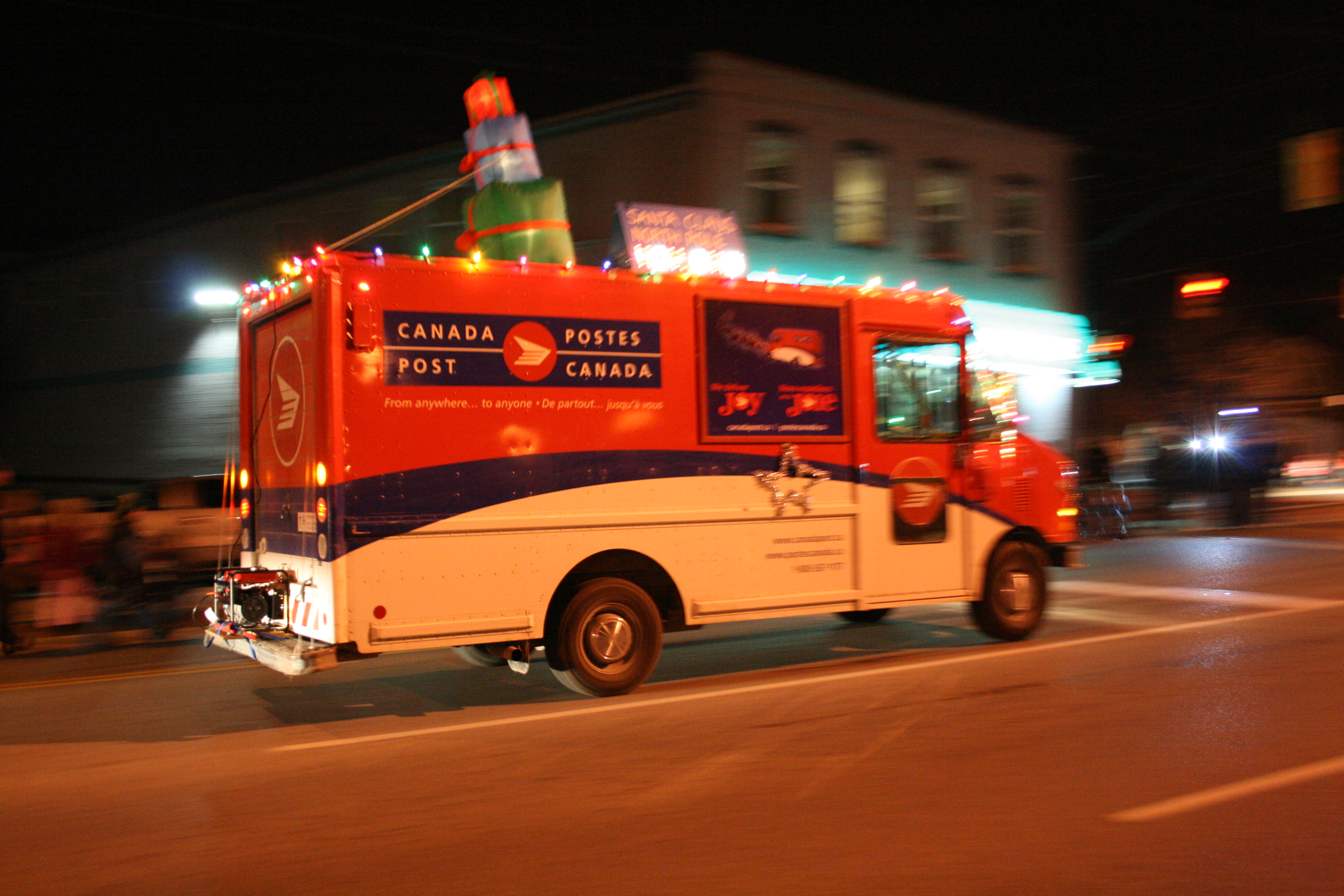
A holiday-themed Canada Post delivery truck with a sign that reads "Santa Claus North Pole" on its top

Canada Post receives millions of letters addressed to Santa Claus each year. In 1974, three Canada Post employees started to respond to mail addressed to Santa in Montreal, Quebec. In 1982, Canada Post rolled out the initiative across Canada and pledged that every letter sent in would receive a reply. A stamp is not required when sending a letter to Santa Claus from Canada and a special dedicated postal code was created, H0H 0H0. About 15,000 current and retired employees respond in many languages to each letter received on behalf of Santa. Over the past 27 years, more than 15 million letters were written by volunteers. Canada Post also receives letters to God and, on occasion, the Easter Bunny.

In 2001, Canada Post started accepting e-mail messages to Santa. In 2006, more than 44,000 email messages were responded to.

The 2024 strike caused Canada Post to remove its deadline for sending letters to Santa when its letters to Santa program was disrupted. Parents were forced to find alternative ways to send their children's wishes. Across the country, libraries, businesses, firefighters, and others stepped in to help. The emailSanta.com website, which was created in the wake of the 1997 Canada Post strike as alternative way to send letters to Santa then, saw an increase by over 250 per cent in letters to Santa.

== See also ==
- List of postal entities
- Postal Union of the Americas, Spain and Portugal
- Caribbean Postal Union
- International Post Corporation
- Royal Philatelic Society of Canada
