= Canada Post stamp releases (2010–2014) =

Please see Canada Post stamp releases (2000–2004) for any stamps produced between 2000–2004.
Please see Canada Post stamp releases (2005–2009) for any stamps produced between 2005–2009.

== 2010 ==
Date of Issue	Theme	Denomination	Design	Illustration	Quantity	Printing Process	Paper Type	First Day Cover Cancellation
8 January 2010	Year of the Tiger	Permanent	Wilson Chi and Ian Lam	Bill Lao and Joseph Chan	6,500,000	Lithography in 5 colours plus 2 foil stampings, embossing/debossing and varnishing	Tullis Russell Coatings	Markham, ON
8 January 2010	Year of the Tiger (International)	$1.70	Wilson Chi and Ian Lam	Bill Lao and Joseph Chan	750,000	Lithography in 5 colours plus 2 foil stampings, embossing/debossing and varnishing	Tullis Russell Coatings	Markham, ON
11 January 2010	Definitives:Flag over Historic Mills (Watson's Mill)	Permanent	Gottschalk and Ash Intl	James Watt, Laura Arsie, Ken Watson, David Chapman	Continuous Printing	Lithography in 5 colours	Tullis Russell Coatings	Delta, ON and Manotick, ON
11 January 2010	Definitives:Flag over Historic Mills (Keremeos Grist Mill)	Permanent	Gottschalk and Ash Intl	James Watt, Laura Arsie, Ken Watson, David Chapman	Continuous Printing	Lithography in 5 colours	Tullis Russell Coatings	Delta, ON and Manotick, ON
11 January 2010	Definitives:Flag over Historic Mills (Old Stone Mill)	Permanent	Gottschalk and Ash Intl	James Watt, Laura Arsie, Ken Watson, David Chapman	Continuous Printing	Lithography in 5 colours	Tullis Russell Coatings	Delta, ON and Manotick, ON
11 January 2010	Definitives:Flag over Historic Mills (Riordon Grist Mill)	Permanent	Gottschalk and Ash Intl	James Watt, Laura Arsie, Ken Watson, David Chapman	Continuous Printing	Lithography in 5 colours	Tullis Russell Coatings	Delta, ON and Manotick, ON
11 January 2010	Definitives:Flag over Historic Mills (Cornell Mill)	Permanent	Gottschalk and Ash Intl	James Watt, Laura Arsie, Ken Watson, David Chapman	Continuous Printing	Lithography in 5 colours	Tullis Russell Coatings	Delta, ON and Manotick, ON
11 January 2010	Definitives:Queen Elizabeth II	Permanent	Gottschalk and Ash Intl	Dept. of Canadian Heritage	Continuous Printing	Lithography in 5 colours	Tullis Russell Coatings	Jasper, AB
11 January 2010	Definitives:Flowers Striped Coralroot	Permanent	Monique Dufour and Sophie Lafortune	DAZimmerman, M Fletcher, J Martin, JE Newfeld, A Saint-James	Continuous printing	Lithography in 5 colours	Lowe-Martin Group	Flowers Cove, Nfld
11 January 2010	Definitives:Flowers – Giant Helleborine	One dollar	Monique Dufour and Sophie Lafortune	DAZimmerman, M Fletcher, J Martin, JE Newfeld, A Saint-James	Continuous printing	Lithography in 5 colours	Lowe-Martin Group	Flowers Cove, Nfld
11 January 2010	Definitives:Flowers – Grass Pink	One dollar and twenty two cents	Monique Dufour and Sophie Lafortune	DAZimmerman, M Fletcher, J Martin, JE Newfeld, A Saint-James	Continuous printing	Lithography in 5 colours	Lowe-Martin Group	Flowers Cove, Nfld
11 January 2010	Definitives:Flowers – Rose Pogonia	One dollar and seventy cents	Monique Dufour and Sophie Lafortune	DAZimmerman, M Fletcher, J Martin, JE Newfeld, A Saint-James	Continuous printing	Lithography in 5 colours	Lowe-Martin Group	Flowers Cove, Nfld
12 January 2010	Vancouver Olympics: Vancouver Landscape	57 cents	Tandem Design and VANOC	iStockphoto and John Sinal	2,275,000	Lithography in 6 colours plus varnish	Tullis Russell Coatings	Vancouver, BC
12 January 2010	Vancouver Olympics: Whister – Sea to Sky	57 cents	Tandem Design and VANOC	iStockphoto and John Sinal	2,275,000	Lithography in 6 colours plus varnish	Tullis Russell Coatings	Whistler, BC
1 February 2010	Black History Series: William Hall, VC	57 cents	Lara Minja	Suzanne Duranceau	1,600,000	Lithography in 7 colours plus varnishing	Tullis Russell Coatings	Hantsport, NS
8 February 2010	Roméo LeBlanc Striped Coralroot	57 cents	Dennis Page, Oliver Hill	Christian Nicholson, Adrien Duey	1,500,000	Lithography in 8 colours	Tullis-Russell	Memramcook, New Brunswick
14 February 2010	Canada Strikes Gold	57 cents	Tandem Design	VANOC	5,000,000	Litho in 6 cols plus varnish	Tullis Russell	Vancouver, BC
22 February 2010	Celebrate Our Olympic Spirit: Bobsleigh, Speed Skating Striped Coralroot	57 cents	Signals Design Group	Frank Gunn, Robert Lepage, Donald Milne, Oliver Lange		Lithography in 5 colours	Tullis-Russell and Lowe-Martin Group	West Vancouver, BC and Richmond, BC
22 February 2010	Celebrate Our Olympic Spirit: Cross Country Ski, Chandra Crawford	57 cents	Signals Design Group	Frank Gunn, Robert Lepage, Donald Milne, Oliver Lange		Lithography in 5 colours	Tullis-Russell and Lowe-Martin Group	West Vancouver, BC and Richmond, BC
3 March 2010	African Violets: Picasso Striped Coralroot	Permanent	Isabelle Toussaint, Design graphique	Isabelle Toussaint, Design graphique	6,500,000	Lithography in 5 colours	Tullis-Russell	Etobicoke, ON
3 March 2010	African Violets: Decelles Avalanche	Permanent	Isabelle Toussaint, Design graphique	Isabelle Toussaint, Design graphique	6,500,000	Lithography in 5 colours	Tullis-Russell	Etobicoke, ON
April 14	Canada-Israel, 60 Yrs of Friendship	1.70	Q30 Design	Yarek Waszul	660,000	Lithography in 4 cols	Tullis Russell	Ottawa
April 19	The Four Indian Kings (Ho Nee Yeath Taw No Row (baptized John), King of Generethgarich, 1710)	57 cents	Sputnik Design	Library and Archives Canada	1,500,000	Litho in 9 cols	Tullis	Ottawa
April 19	The Four Indian Kings (Tee Yee Neen Ho Ga Row (baptized Hendrick), Emperor of the Six Nations, 1710)	57 cents	Sputnik Design	Library and Archives Canada	1,500,000	Litho in 9 cols	Tullis	Ottawa
April 19	The Four Indian Kings (Sa Ga Yeath Qua Pieth Tow (baptized Brant), King of the Maquas, 1710)	57 cents	Sputnik Design	Library and Archives Canada	1,500,000	Litho in 9 cols	Tullis	Ottawa
April 19	The Four Indian Kings (Etow Oh Koam (baptized Nicholas), King of the River Nation, 1710)	57 cents	Sputnik Design	Library and Archives Canada	1,500,000	Litho in 9 cols	Tullis	Ottawa
May 4	Canadian Navy: 1910-2010 HMCS Niobe	57 cents	Designwerke Inc.	Photos from Canadian Navy	3,000,000	Litho in 6 cols plus varnish	Tullis	Ottawa
May 4	Canadian Navy: 1910-2010 HMCS Halifax	57 cents	Designwerke Inc.	Photos from Canadian Navy	3,000,000	Litho in 6 cols plus varnish	Tullis	Ottawa
May 13	Marine Life, Sea Otter	57 cents	Martin Morck	Various	2,200,000	Litho in 3 cols and intaglio	Tullis	Victoria
May 13	Marine Life, Harbor Porpoise	57 cents	Martin Morck	Various	2,200,000	Litho in 3 cols and intaglio	Tullis	Victoria
May 22	Canadian Geographic Wildlife Photograph of the Year	57 cents	Susan Scott	Various	4,000,000	Litho in 5 cols	Tullis	Ottawa
June 18	Rotary International: 100 Years in Canada	57 cents	Xerxes Irani	Beau Lark	2,000,000	Litho in 6 cols plus varnish	Tullis	Montreal
July 2	Art Canada: Prudence Heward	57 cents	Helene L'Heureux	Helene L'Heureux	1,500,000	Litho in 7 colours	Tullis	Montreal
July 5	Roadside Attractions: Coffee Pot	57 cents	Fraser Ross	Bonnie Ross	3,880,000	Litho in 8 cols plus varnish	Tullis	Davidson, SK
July 5	Roadside Attractions: Happy Rock	57 cents	Fraser Ross	Bonnie Ross	3,880,000	Litho in 8 cols plus varnish	Tullis	Davidson, SK
July 5	Roadside Attractions: Puffin	57 cents	Fraser Ross	Bonnie Ross	3,880,000	Litho in 8 cols plus varnish	Tullis	Davidson, SK
July 5	Roadside Attractions: Wawa Goose	57 cents	Fraser Ross	Bonnie Ross	3,880,000	Litho in 8 cols plus varnish	Tullis	Davidson, SK
July 8	Girl Guides: 100 Years in Canada	57 cents	Derwyn Goodall	Derwyn Goodall	3,000,000	Litho in 6 cols plus varnish	Tullis	Guelph, Ontario
August 17	Cupids (Cupers Cove): 1610–2010	57 cents	Steven Slipp	Fraser Ross, William Gilbert	1,750,000	Litho in 9 cols	Lowe-Martin	Cupids, NL
September 1	Home Children	57 cents	Debbie Adams	Library and Archives Canada	1,650,000	Litho in 6 cols plus varnish	Tullis	Ottawa, ON
September 7	Mental health	Permanent plus 10 cents	Louis Gagnon (from Paprika Design)	Louis Gagnon (from Paprika Design)	4,000,000	Litho in 7 cols	Tullis	Ottawa, ON

== 2011 ==
- This is an incomplete list

Date of Issue	Theme	Denomination	Design	Illustration	Quantity	Printing Process	Paper Type	First Day Cover Cancellation
22 June 2011	Royal Wedding Day	Permanent	Isabelle Toussaint	Paul Ellis and David Tomlinson; Getty Images	10,000,000	Lithography in 7 colours	Tullis Russell Coatings	Ottawa, ON

== Annual stamp poll ==
- The annual poll is conducted in conjunction with Canada Stamp News.

=== 2010 results ===
- Favorite Canadian 2010 stamp issues

Stamp	Votes	Percentage
Blue Whale	662	19.8%
Year of the Tiger	335	10.02%
Canadian Geographic Photos of the Year	262	7.83%

- Most relevant Canadian 2010 stamp issues

Stamp	Votes	Percentage
Canadian Navy, 1910–2010	709	21.58%
Celebrating our Olympic Spirit	456	13.88%
Canada Strikes Gold! (Olympic theme)	398	12.11%

- Least Favorite Canadian 2010 stamp issues

Stamp	Votes	Percentage
Mental Health	519	15.91%
Canada-Israel, 60 years	365	11.91%
Rotary International in Canada, 100th Anniversary	323	9.9%

- Least Relevant Canadian 2010 stamp issues

Stamp	Votes	Percentage
Year of the Tiger	823	25.77%
Canada-Israel, 60 years	404	12.65%
African Violets	317	9.92%

== Commemorative envelopes ==
Date of Issue	Theme	Design	Quantity
10 January 2010	Le Devoir	Christian Tiffet	10,000
6 July 2010	Saskatchewan Roughriders Centennial	Celine Morriset, Andre Monette	20,000

== Cancels ==
Year	Theme	Place of Cancellation
2010	Vancouver Olympic Games: Alpine Ski	Whistler, BC
2010	Vancouver Olympic Games: Biathlon	Whistler, BC
2010	Vancouver Olympic Games: Bobsleigh	Whistler, BC
2010	Vancouver Olympic Games: Cross Country Ski	Whistler, BC
2010	Vancouver Olympic Games: Curling	Vancouver, BC
2010	Vancouver Olympic Games: Figure Skating	Vancouver, BC
2010	Vancouver Olympic Games: Freestyle Skiing : Aerials	West Vancouver, BC
2010	Vancouver Olympic Games: Freestyle Skiing : Moguls	West Vancouver, BC
2010	Vancouver Olympic Games: Freestyle Skiing : Ski Cross	West Vancouver, BC
2010	Vancouver Olympic Games: Ice Hockey	Vancouver, BC
2010	Vancouver Olympic Games: Luge	Whistler, BC
2010	Vancouver Olympic Games: Nordic Combined	Whistler, BC
2010	Vancouver Olympic Games: Short Track Speed Skating	Vancouver, BC
2010	Vancouver Olympic Games: Skeleton	Whistler, BC
2010	Vancouver Olympic Games: Ski Jumping	Whistler, BC
2010	Vancouver Olympic Games: Snowboard Cross	West Vancouver, BC
2010	Vancouver Olympic Games: Snowboard Halfpipe	West Vancouver, BC
2010	Vancouver Olympic Games: Snowboard Parallel G-Slalom	West Vancouver, BC
2010	Vancouver Olympic Games: Speed Skating	Richmond, BC
2010	Vancouver Paralympic Games: Alpine Ski	Whistler, BC
2010	Vancouver Paralympic Games: Biathlon	Whistler, BC
2010	Vancouver Paralympic Games: Cross Country Ski	Whistler, BC
2010	Vancouver Paralympic Games: Ice Sledge Hockey	Whistler, BC

== Choosing Canada's stamps ==
Although Canada Post is responsible for stamp design and production, the corporation does not actually choose the subjects or the final designs that appear on stamps. That task falls under the jurisprudence of the Stamp Advisory Committee. Their objective is to recommend a balanced stamp program that will have broad-based appeal, regionally and culturally, reflecting Canadian history, heritage, and tradition.

Before Canada Post calls a meeting of the committee, it also welcomes suggestions for stamp subjects from Canadian citizens. Ideas for subjects that have recently appeared on a stamp are declined. The committee works two years in advance and can approve approximately 20 subjects for each year.

Once a stamp subject is selected, Canada Post's Stamp Products group conducts research. Designs are commissioned from two firms, both chosen for their expertise. The designs are presented anonymously to the committee. The committee's process and selection policy have changed little in the thirty years since it was introduced.

Any ideas for a stamp should be sent to: Chairperson of the Stamp Advisory Committee, Canada Post, 2701 Riverside Drive Suite N1070, Ottawa, ON, K1A 0B1.
