= Canada Post stamp releases (2000–2004) =

Throughout the 2000s, Canada Post has issued a large number of stamps with different designs and themes. One of the key changes in the decade was that Canada Post issued series of stamps on a yearly basis. An example is the National Hockey League All-Star Stamps. These stamps began in 2000 to commemorate the 2000 NHL All-Star Game in Toronto. The popularity of the stamps led to the series being produced until 2005. Another example of an ongoing collection is the Chinese Lunar New Year stamps. The stamps have been released on an annual basis with a different animal featured every year. Unlike the United States Postal Service, Canada puts people that are still alive on its stamps. In the 2000s, such people have included Roberta Bondar, Wayne Gretzky, Gerhard Herzberg, and Oscar Peterson.

Besides producing the stamps themselves, Canada Post produces collectibles with the stamp designs in mind. Clocks, collector plates and lithographs feature stamp designs. Flowers were very popular choices for these types of collectibles. The tulip stamps were featured on collector plates (Canada Post item numbers 250437 and 250438) in 2004 and sold for $29.95 each. The Orchids of Canada stamps were used for a 2004 clock (Canada Post item number 314667) and sold at $19.95 each.

Please see Canada Post stamp releases (2005–2009) for any stamps produced between 2005–2009.

== Themes ==
=== NHL All-Stars Stamp collectibles ===
The popularity of the NHL All-Stars stamps led to various collectibles. In 2004, the number of collectibles expanded. NHL Heritage Jersey and Stamp Sets were released by Canada Post. The limited edition sets featured a print of vintage team hockey jerseys and the corresponding official NHL All-Stars stamp. Each set was encased in a protective Plexiglas cover and sold for $9.99 each. Another collectible was the 2004 Hockey Puck Bank (Canada Post item number 341659) at $7.99. Each bank featured the images of all six NHL All-Stars that were featured on 2004 Canada Post stamp releases. It measured 16.5 cm (6.5 inches) in diameter and featured a stand.

Dating back to 2002, a Commemorative Stamp and Medallion Set were issued too. It was a collectible honouring the NHL All-Star Game. A souvenir sheet of the six NHL All-Stars featured on stamps for the corresponding year along with six collectible medallions manufactured by the Royal Canadian Mint were part of the set. The set included a premium booklet with career stats for all six NHL All-Stars, a special metal wafer bearing the limited edition number and an official All-Star Game puck. The sets sold for $89.99 each. Approximately 10,000 sets were made in 2002, (item number 243208) and 5,000 were made for 2003 (item number 341616) and 2004 (item number 341634).

Canada Post released other unique types of collectibles too. Special limited edition lithographs were sold at $12.99 each. They measured 279 mm x 356 mm (11 inches x 14 inches). As an added collectible, lithographs were featured in wood-framed canvas prints and were signed by the corresponding player. These were limited to 500 copies each and sold for $89.99 each, along with a certificate of authenticity.

Coasters (item number 341636), made from wood and cork, and presented in a round, black metal container with a logo-embossed lid were sold for $7.99 each. The coasters featured the images of the athletes on the 2004 NHL All-Stars stamps. Another new release for 2004 was All-Star Stamp Cards (item number 341635). These were the same size as standard hockey cards and all six NHL All-Stars were featured in a pack of six cards. There were 17,000 packs produced and as a bonus, one in ten packs featured an autographed card. The cost of one pack was $9.99.

=== Chinese Lunar New Year ===
Canada Post debuted its Chinese Lunar New Year stamps with the Year of the Ox in 1997. The popularity of the stamps led to a wide array of products. One of the first collectibles that was created was the Stamp and Precious Coin Set. Although prices vary from year to year, the set would come in a presentation album and feature the Royal Canadian Mint's Chinese Lunar New Year sterling silver coin for the corresponding year. A stamp souvenir sheet was included with a numbered certificate of authenticity. The sets started in 1997 and will continue until 2009.

Besides the stamp and coin set, a framed print is sold too. The framed print started in 2002 with the Year of the Horse. Only 2,500 prints are produced and an officially cancelled Lunar New Year souvenir sheet is affixed and hand numbered. There are also many stamp collectibles as well. The prices vary from year to year due to the continuing increase in the cost of postage stamps and the number of uncut press sheets released.

A Lunar New Year Pack is produced on an annual basis and features a collection of international Chinese Lunar New Year stamps. The stamps come from Canada, China, and Hong Kong. Along with the stamps, the Chinese horoscope for the corresponding year, with the text in three languages, are featured in the pack/folder. (2002-2004 rates - $12.95) Two of the more expensive stamp collectibles are a stamp pane of 25 stamps (2004 rate - $12.25) and an uncut press sheet (2004 rate - $16.95). Lower priced collectibles include a souvenir sheet (2004 rate - $1.40) and the souvenir sheet first day cancel (2004 rate - $2.40). Prepaid domestic and international postcards comprise other low-cost collectibles.

THIS IS A WORK IN PROGRESS ANYONE WITH STAMP INFORMATION IS WELCOME TO CONTRIBUTE TO THIS PAGE

== 2000 ==
Date of Issue	Theme	Denomination	Printer	Quantity	Perforation	Creator(s)
1 January 2000	Canada Millennium Partnership Program	46 cents	N/A	N/A	N/A	N/A
5 January 2000	Year of the Dragon	46 cents	N/A	N/A	N/A	N/A
5 January 2000	Year of the Dragon	95 cents	N/A	N/A	N/A	N/A
5 February 2000	NHL All-Stars, Wayne Gretzky	46 cents	Canadian Bank Note Company	6,000,000	13	Designed by Dan Fell, Illustration by Vincent McIndoe
5 February 2000	NHL All-Stars, Gordie Howe	46 cents	Canadian Bank Note Company	6,000,000	13	Designed by Dan Fell, Illustration by Vincent McIndoe
5 February 2000	NHL All-Stars, Maurice Richard	46 cents	Canadian Bank Note Company	6,000,000	13	Designed by Dan Fell, Illustration by Vincent McIndoe
5 February 2000	NHL All-Stars, Doug Harvey	46 cents	Canadian Bank Note Company	6,000,000	13	Designed by Dan Fell, Illustration by Vincent McIndoe
5 February 2000	NHL All-Stars, Bobby Orr	46 cents	Canadian Bank Note Company	6,000,000	13	Designed by Dan Fell, Illustration by Vincent McIndoe
5 February 2000	NHL All-Stars, Jacques Plante	46 cents	Canadian Bank Note Company	6,000,000	13	Designed by Dan Fell, Illustration by Vincent McIndoe
1 March 2000	Birds of Canada - Canada warbler	46 cents	N/A	N/A	N/A	N/A
1 March 2000	Birds of Canada - osprey	46 cents	N/A	N/A	N/A	N/A
1 March 2000	Birds of Canada - Pacific loon	46 cents	N/A	N/A	N/A	N/A
1 March 2000	Birds of Canada - blue jay	46 cents	N/A	N/A	N/A	N/A
10 April 2000	Supreme Court of Canada	46 cents	N/A	N/A	N/A	N/A
25 April 2000	Ritual of the Calling of an Engineer	46 cents	N/A	N/A	N/A	N/A
28 April 2000	Rural Mailboxes	46 cents	N/A	N/A	N/A	N/A
23 May 2000	Queen Mother	46 cents	N/A	N/A	N/A	N/A
23 May 2000	Fresh Waters of Canada	55 cents	N/A	N/A	N/A	N/A
23 May 2000	Fresh Waters of Canada	95 cents	N/A	N/A	N/A	N/A
1 June 2000	Boys and Girls Clubs of Canada	46 cents	N/A	N/A	N/A	N/A
29 June 2000	Seventh Day Adventist Church	46 cents	N/A	N/A	N/A	N/A
7 July 2000	Masterpieces of Canadian Art	95 cents	N/A	N/A	N/A	N/A
19 July 2000	Tall Ships	46 cents	N/A	N/A	N/A	N/A
1 September 2000	Department of Labour	46 cents	N/A	N/A	N/A	N/A
13 September 2000	Petro-Canada: 1975–2000	46 cents	N/A	N/A	N/A	N/A
2 October 2000	Whales	46 cents	N/A	N/A	N/A	N/A
3 November 2000	Christmas (Nativity)	46 cents	N/A	N/A	N/A	N/A
3 November 2000	Christmas (Nativity)	46 cents	N/A	N/A	N/A	N/A
3 November 2000	Christmas (Nativity)	46 cents	N/A	N/A	N/A	N/A
11 November 2000	Regiments	46 cents	N/A	N/A	N/A	N/A

== 2001 ==
Date of Issue	Theme	Denomination	Printer	Quantity	Design	Perforation	First Day Cover Cancellation
5 January 2001	Year of the Snake	47 cents	Ashton-Potter Canada Limited	12,000,000	Marlene Wou and Lyle Sopel	14 x 14.5	N/A
5 January 2001	Year of the Snake	$1.05	Ashton-Potter Canada Limited	2 980 000	Marlene Wou and Lyle Sopel	14 x 14.5	N/A
18 January 2001	NHL All-Stars, Jean Beliveau	47 cents	Ashton-Potter Canada Limited	3,000,000	Stephane Huot and Charles Vinh	12.5 x 13	N/A
18 January 2001	NHL All-Stars, Eddie Shore	47 cents	Ashton-Potter Canada Limited	3,000,000	Stephane Huot and Charles Vinh	12.5 x 13	N/A
18 January 2001	NHL All-Stars, Terry Sawchuk	47 cents	Ashton-Potter Canada Limited	3,000,000	Stephane Huot and Charles Vinh	12.5 x 13	N/A
18 January 2001	NHL All-Stars, Denis Potvin	47 cents	Ashton-Potter Canada Limited	3,000,000	Stephane Huot and Charles Vinh	12.5 x 13	N/A
18 January 2001	NHL All-Stars, Bobby Hull	47 cents	Ashton-Potter Canada Limited	3,000,000	Stephane Huot and Charles Vinh	12.5 x 13	N/A
18 January 2001	NHL All-Stars, Syl Apps	47 cents	Ashton-Potter Canada Limited	3,000,000	Stephane Huot and Charles Vinh	12.5 x 13	N/A
1 February 2001	Birds of Canada	$1.88	N/A	N/A	N/A	N/A	N/A
28 February 2001	Games of La Francophonie	$0.94	N/A	N/A	N/A	N/A	N/A
19 March 2001	World Figure Skating Championships	$0.46	N/A	N/A	N/A	N/A	N/A
6 April 2001	150th Anniv, Transfer of Postal Authority from Britain to Canada	47 cents	N/A	N/A	Tom Yakobina	N/A	Ottawa, Ontario
9 April 2001	Toronto Blue Jays 25th Anniversary	47 cents	N/A	N/A	Paul Haslip	N/A	Toronto, Ontario
20 April 2001	Summit of the Americas	47 cents	N/A	N/A	Denis L'Allier	N/A	Quebec City, Quebec
11 May 2001	Tourist Attractions, Apple Blossom Festival	60 cents	N/A	N/A	Bradbury Design	N/A	Kentville, Nova Scotia
11 May 2001	Tourist Attractions, Butchart Gardens	60 cents	N/A	N/A	Bradbury Design	N/A	Kentville, Nova Scotia
11 May 2001	Tourist Attractions, Niagara on the Lake	60 cents	N/A	N/A	Bradbury Design	N/A	Kentville, Nova Scotia
11 May 2001	Tourist Attractions, Sugar Bushes	60 cents	N/A	N/A	Bradbury Design	N/A	Kentville, Nova Scotia
11 May 2001	Tourist Attractions, White Pass and Yukon Route	60 cents	N/A	N/A	Bradbury Design	N/A	Kentville, Nova Scotia
11 May 2001	Tourist Attractions, Auyuittuq National Park	$1.05	N/A	N/A	Bradbury Design	N/A	St. John's, Newfoundland
11 May 2001	Tourist Attractions, Barkerville	$1.05	N/A	N/A	Bradbury Design	N/A	St. John's, Newfoundland
11 May 2001	Tourist Attractions, Canadian Tulip Festival	$1.05	N/A	N/A	Bradbury Design	N/A	St. John's, Newfoundland
11 May 2001	Tourist Attractions, Signal Hill	$1.05	N/A	N/A	Bradbury Design	N/A	St. John's, Newfoundland
11 May 2001	Tourist Attractions, The Forks	$1.05	N/A	N/A	Bradbury Design	N/A	St. John's, Newfoundland
16 May 2001	1,700 Years of the Armeninan Church	47 cents	N/A	N/A	Debbie Adams	N/A	Toronto, Ontario
1 June 2001	Royal Military College of Canada	47 cents	N/A	N/A	Jim Hudson	N/A	Kingston, Ontario
1 July 2001	Pierre Elliott Trudeau	$0.46	N/A	N/A	N/A	N/A	N/A

== 2002 ==
Date of Issue	Theme	Denomination	Printer	Quantity	Design	Perforation	First Day Cover Cancellation
2 January 2002	Maple Leaf	48 cents	Ashton-Potter (USA) Limited	N/A	Pierre-Yves Pelletier	Diecut, imperforate	N/A
2 January 2002	Traditional Trades, Jewelry	65 cents	Ashton-Potter (USA) Limited	N/A	Designed by Monique Dufour and Sophie Lafortune, based on photographs by Richard Robitaille and based on a jewel by Anne Sportun	Diecut, imperforate	N/A
2 January 2002	Traditional Trades, Basket Weaving	77 cents	Ashton-Potter (USA) Limited	N/A	Designed by Monique Dufour and Sophie Lafortune, and based on photographs by Richard Robitaille	Diecut, imperforate	N/A
2 January 2002	Traditional Trades, Sculpture	$1.25	Ashton-Potter (USA) Limited	N/A	Designed by Monique Dufour and Sophie Lafortune, based on photographs by Richard Robitaille, and based on a sculpture by Simon Dick	Diecut, imperforate	N/A
2 January 2002	Flag	48 cents	Ashton-Potter (USA) Limited	N/A	Designed by Katalin Kovats Designed by Stuart Bradley Ash Based on a photograph by Paul Eekhoff	Diecut, imperforate	N/A
2 January 2002	Queen Elizabeth II: Golden Jubilee	48 cents	Ashton-Potter (USA) Limited	15,000,000	Designed by Saskia van Kampen Designed by Stuart Bradley Ash	13 x 12.5	N/A
3 January 2002	Year of the Horse	47 cents	Ashton-Potter Canada Limited and Gravure Choquet Inc.	11 000 000	Designed by Gilbert Li, Carey George, Ian Rapsey, Amy Chan, Dean Martin and based on illustrations by Gary Alphonso and David Dao-Yan Hu	13.5	N/A
3 January 2002	Year of the Horse	$1.25	Ashton-Potter Canada Limited and Gravure Choquet Inc.	2 120 000	Designed by Gilbert Li, Carey George, Ian Rapsey, Amy Chan, Dean Martin and based on illustrations by Gary Alphonso and David Dao-Yan Hu	13.5	N/A
12 January 2002	NHL All-Stars, Tim Horton	47 cents	Canadian Bank Note Company, Limited	1 500 000	Designed by Stéphane Huot and Based on an illustration by Charles Vinh	12.5 x 13	N/A
12 January 2002	NHL All-Stars, Guy Lafleur	47 cents	Canadian Bank Note Company, Limited	1 500 000	Designed by Stéphane Huot and Based on an illustration by Charles Vinh	12.5 x 13	N/A
12 January 2002	NHL All-Stars, Howie Morenz	47 cents	Canadian Bank Note Company, Limited	1 500 000	Designed by Stéphane Huot and Based on an illustration by Charles Vinh	12.5 x 13	N/A
12 January 2002	NHL All-Stars, Glenn Hall	47 cents	Canadian Bank Note Company, Limited	1 500 000	Designed by Stéphane Huot and Based on an illustration by Charles Vinh	12.5 x 13	N/A
12 January 2002	NHL All-Stars, Red Kelly	47 cents	Canadian Bank Note Company, Limited	1 500 000	Designed by Stéphane Huot and Based on an illustration by Charles Vinh	12.5 x 13	N/A
12 January 2002	NHL All-Stars, Phil Esposito	47 cents	Canadian Bank Note Company, Limited	1 500 000	Designed by Stéphane Huot and Based on an illustration by Charles Vinh	12.5 x 13	N/A
25 January 2002	2002 Olympic Winter Games, Short Track Speed Skating	47 cents	Ashton-Potter Canada Limited	1 250 000	Designed by Sunil Bhandari and by Matthew Wearn, based on photographs by Patrick McCoy and Robert McNeil	13.5 x 13	N/A
25 January 2002	2002 Olympic Winter Games, Curling	48 cents	Ashton-Potter (USA) Limited	1 2500 000	Designed by Sunil Bhandari and Matthew Wearn, based on a photograph by Michael Burns	13.5 x 13	N/A
25 January 2002	2002 Olympic Winter Games, Freestyle Aerials	48 cents	Ashton-Potter (USA) Limited	1 2500 000	Designed by Sunil Bhandari and Matthew Wearn, based on a photograph by Mike Ridewood	13.5 x 13	N/A
25 January 2002	2002 Olympic Winter Games, Women's Hockey	48 cents	Ashton-Potter (USA) Limited	1 2500 000	Designed by Sunil Bhandari and Matthew Wearn, based on a photograph by Matthew Plexman	13.5 x 13	N/A
1 February 2002	Canadian Governors General, 1952-2002	48 cents	Ashton-Potter (USA) Limited	4 000 000	Designed by Neville Smith	13.5 x 12.5	N/A
1 February 2002	Canadian Universities, University of Manitoba, 1877-2002	48 cents	Ashton-Potter (USA) Limited	3 000 000	Designed by Steven Slipp, Based on photographs by Mike Grandmaison, Based on an illustration by Bonnie Ross	13.5	N/A
22 March 2002	Masterpieces of Canadian Art Series, Church and Horse, 1964, Alex Colville	$1.25	Ashton-Potter (USA) Limited and Gravure Choquet Inc.	4 000 000	Designed by Pierre-Yves Pelletier, Based on a painting by David Alexander Colville	12.5 x 13	N/A
22 March 2002	Canadian Universities, University of Trinity College, 1852-2002	48 cents	Ashton-Potter (USA) Limited and Gravure Choquet Inc.	3 000 000	Designed by Steven Slipp, Based on a photograph by James Steeves, Based on an illustration by Bonnie Ross	13.5	N/A
4 October 2002	Canadian Teachers	48 cents	N/A	N/A	N/A	N/A	N/A
24 October 2002	Toronto Stock Exchange	48 cents	N/A	N/A	N/A	N/A	N/A
31 October 2002	Communications Technology	96 cents	N/A	N/A	N/A	N/A	N/A
4 November 2002	Christmas (Aboriginal Art)	48 cents	N/A	N/A	N/A	N/A	N/A
4 November 2002	Christmas (Aboriginal Art)	65 cents	N/A	N/A	N/A	N/A	N/A
4 November 2002	Christmas (Aboriginal Art)	$1.25	N/A	N/A	N/A	N/A	N/A
7 November 2002	Orchestre Symphonique de Québec	$1.25	N/A	N/A	N/A	N/A	N/A

== 2003 ==
Date of Issue	Theme	Denomination	Printer	Quantity	Design	Perforation	First Day Cover Cancellation
3 January 2003	Year of the Goat	48 cents	N/A	N/A	N/A	N/A	N/A
18 January 2003	NHL All-Stars, Frank Mahovlich	48 cents	Canadian Bank Note Company, Limited	1 000 000	Designed by Stéphane Huot and based on an illustration by Charles Vinh	12.5 x 13; simulated = simulée	N/A
18 January 2003	NHL All-Stars, Ray Bourque	48 cents	Canadian Bank Note Company, Limited	1 000 000	Designed by Stéphane Huot and based on an illustration by Charles Vinh	12.5 x 13; simulated = simulée	N/A
18 January 2003	NHL All-Stars, Serge Savard	48 cents	Canadian Bank Note Company, Limited	1 000 000	Designed by Stéphane Huot and based on an illustration by Charles Vinh	12.5 x 13; simulated = simulée	N/A
18 January 2003	NHL All-Stars, Stan Mikita	48 cents	Canadian Bank Note Company, Limited	1 000 000	Designed by Stéphane Huot and based on an illustration by Charles Vinh	12.5 x 13; simulated = simulée	N/A
18 January 2003	NHL All-Stars, Mike Bossy	48 cents	Canadian Bank Note Company, Limited	1 000 000	Designed by Stéphane Huot and based on an illustration by Charles Vinh	12.5 x 13; simulated = simulée	N/A
18 January 2003	NHL All-Stars, Bill Durnan	48 cents	Canadian Bank Note Company, Limited	1 000 000	Designed by Stéphane Huot and based on an illustration by Charles Vinh	12.5 x 13; simulated = simulée	N/A
28 January 2003	Bishop's University	48 cents	N/A	N/A	Designed by Denis L'Allier	N/A	N/A
21 February 2003	John James Audubon's birds	48 cents	N/A	N/A	N/A	N/A	N/A
2 March 2003	Canadian Rangers	48 cents	N/A	N/A	N/A	N/A	N/A
19 March 2003	University of Western Ontario	48 cents	N/A	N/A	Designed by Denis L'Allier	N/A	N/A
25 March 2003	American Hellenic Educational Progressive Association	48 cents	N/A	N/A		N/A	Toronto, ON
4 April 2003	St. Francis Xavier University	48 cents	N/A	N/A	Designed by Denis L'Allier, with photograph by Guy Lavigueur	N/A	N/A
28 May 2003	Canada's Volunteer Firefighters	48 cents	N/A	N/A	N/A	N/A	Hanover, ON
2 June 2003	Queen Elizabeth II, Coronation 50th Anniv.	48 cents	N/A	N/A	N/A	N/A	N/A
6 June 2003	Pedro da Silva	48 cents	N/A	N/A	N/A	N/A	N/A
11 June 2003	Tourist Attractions (International)	$1.25	N/A	N/A	N/A	N/A	N/A
19 June 2003	Macdonald Institute	48 cents	N/A	N/A	Designed by Denis L'Allier	N/A	N/A
8 July 2003	The Lutheran World Federation	48 cents	N/A	N/A	N/A	N/A	N/A
25 July 2003	The Korean War	48 cents	Canadian Bank Note Company, Limited	3 000 000	Designed by Steven Slipp, Based on photographs by Bill Olson, Larry Milberry and W.N. Cridland	13	N/A
4 September 2003	Université de Montréal 1878-2003	48 cents	Canadian Bank Note Company, Limited	3 000 000	Designed by Denis L'Allier, Based on a photograph by Guy Lavigueur	13.5	N/A
8 September 2003	Canadian Authors, Morley Callaghan	48 cents	Canadian Bank Note company, Limited	750 000	Designed by Katalin Kovats, Based on photographs by Yousuf Karsh, Hans-Ludwig Blohm, and Michael Kohn	13 x 12.5	N/A
8 September 2003	Canadian Authors, Susanna Moodie and Catharine Parr Traill	48 cents	Canadian Bank Note company, Limited	750 000	Designed by Katalin Kovats, Based on a photograph provided by National Archives of Canada, Hans-Ludwig Blohm and Michael Kohn	13 x 12.5	N/A
8 September 2003	Canadian Authors, Anne Hébert	48 cents	Canadian Bank Note company, Limited	750 000	Designed by Katalin Kovats, Based on photographs by Harry Palmer, Hans-Ludwig Blohm and Michael Kohn	13 x 12.5	N/A
8 September 2003	Canadian Authors, Hector de Saint-Denys Garneau	48 cents	Canadian Bank Note company, Limited	750 000	Designed by Katalin Kovats, Based on photographs provided by Garneau family, Hans-Ludwig Blohm and Michael Kohn	13 x 12.5	N/A
10 September 2003	Road World Championships	48 cents	Canadian Bank Note company, Limited	4,000,000	Designed by Doreen Colonello, Based on a photograph by Peter Griffith	12.5 X 13	Hamilton, ON
1 October 2003	Canadian Astronauts, Roberta Bondar	48 cents	N/A	N/A	Pierre-Yves Pelletier	N/A	Saint-Hubert, Quebec
1 October 2003	Canadian Astronauts, Marc Garneau	48 cents	Lowe-Martin Company Inc. and Gravure Choquet Inc.	750 000	Pierre-Yves Pelletier	Kiss Cut	Saint-Hubert, Quebec
1 October 2003	Canadian Astronauts, Chris Hadfield	48 cents	Lowe-Martin Company Inc. and Gravure Choquet Inc.	750 000	Pierre-Yves Pelletier	Kiss Cut	Saint-Hubert, Quebec
1 October 2003	Canadian Astronauts, Steve MacLean	48 cents	Lowe-Martin Company Inc. and Gravure Choquet Inc.	750 000	Pierre-Yves Pelletier	Kiss Cut	Saint-Hubert, Quebec
1 October 2003	Canadian Astronauts, Julie Payette	48 cents	Lowe-Martin Company Inc. and Gravure Choquet Inc.	750 000	Pierre-Yves Pelletier	Kiss Cut	Saint-Hubert, Quebec
1 October 2003	Canadian Astronauts, Robert Thirsk	48 cents	Lowe-Martin Company Inc. and Gravure Choquet Inc.	750 000	Pierre-Yves Pelletier	Kiss Cut	Saint-Hubert, Quebec
1 October 2003	Canadian Astronauts, Bjarni Tryggvason	48 cents	Lowe-Martin Company Inc. and Gravure Choquet Inc.	750 000	Pierre-Yves Pelletier	Kiss Cut	Saint-Hubert, Quebec
1 October 2003	Canadian Astronauts, Dave Williams	48 cents	Lowe-Martin Company Inc. and Gravure Choquet Inc.	750 000	Pierre-Yves Pelletier	Kiss Cut	Saint-Hubert, Quebec
4 October 2003	National Emblems (Canada/Thailand Joint Issue), Acer saccharum (maple tree)	48 cents	Ashton-Potter (USA) Limited	1,650,000	Raymond Bellemaire and Veena Chantanatat	12.5	Notre Dame du Lac, Quebec
4 October 2003	National Emblems (Canada/Thailand Joint Issue), Cassia fistula	48 cents	Ashton-Potter (USA) Limited	1,650,000	Designed by Veena Chantanatat, Based on a photograph by Kirsten Albrecht Llamas	12.5	Notre Dame du Lac, Quebec
7 October 2003	Jean-Paul Riopelle, Masterpieces of Canadian art	48 cents	Lowe-Martin Company Inc.	500,000	Steven Spazuk	12.5 X 13	Quebec City, Quebec
4 November 2003	Christmas Presents	48 cents	N/A	N/A	François Brunelle	N/A	Ottawa, Ontario
4 November 2003	Christmas Presents	65 cents	N/A	N/A	François Brunelle	N/A	Ottawa, Ontario
4 November 2003	Christmas Presents	$1.25	N/A	N/A	François Brunelle	N/A	Ottawa, Ontario
19 December 2003	New Rate Definitives, Flag over City of Edmonton	49 cents	N/A	N/A	Saskia Van Kampen	N/A	Ottawa, Ontario
19 December 2003	New Rate Definitives, Green Maple Leaf	$1.40	N/A	N/A	Monique Dufour and Sophie Lafortune	N/A	Ottawa, Ontario
19 December 2003	New Rate Definitives, Maple Leaf	49 cents	N/A	N/A	Joseph Gault	N/A	Ottawa, Ontario
19 December 2003	New Rate Definitives, Red Maple Leaf	80 cents	N/A	N/A	Monique Dufour and Sophie Lafortune	N/A	Ottawa, Ontario
19 December 2003	New Rate Definitives, Queen Elizabeth II	49 cents	N/A	N/A	Saskia van Kampen and Bryan Adams	N/A	Ottawa, Ontario
19 December 2003	New Rate Definitives, Moose	$5.00	N/A	N/A	Steven Slipp, Jorge Peral and David Preston-Smith	N/A	Ottawa, Ontario

== 2004 ==
Date of Issue	Theme	Denomination	Design	Illustration	Printing Process	Paper Type	First Day Cover Cancellation
8 January 2004	Year of the Monkey	49 cents	Louis Fishauf	Anita Kunz	Lithography in 9 colours plus clear and gold foil stamping plus embossing	Tullis Russell Coatings	Toronto, ON
8 January 2004	Year of the Monkey	$1.40	Louis Fishauf	Anita Kunz	Lithography in 9 colours plus clear and gold foil stamping plus embossing	Tullis Russell Coatings	Toronto, ON
24 January 2004	NHL All-Stars, Johnny Bower	49 cents	Stephane Huot	Charles Vinh, Pierre Rousseau	Lithography in 7 colours	Tullis Russell Coatings	Montreal, Quebec
24 January 2004	NHL All-Stars, Marcel Dionne	49 cents	Stephane Huot	Charles Vinh, Pierre Rousseau	Lithography in 7 colours	Tullis Russell Coatings	Montreal, Quebec
24 January 2004	NHL All-Stars, Ted Lindsay	49 cents	Stephane Huot	Charles Vinh, Pierre Rousseau	Lithography in 7 colours	Tullis Russell Coatings	Montreal, Quebec
24 January 2004	NHL All-Stars, Brad Park	49 cents	Stephane Huot	Charles Vinh, Pierre Rousseau	Lithography in 7 colours	Tullis Russell Coatings	Montreal, Quebec
24 January 2004	NHL All-Stars, Larry Robinson	49 cents	Stephane Huot	Charles Vinh, Pierre Rousseau	Lithography in 7 colours	Tullis Russell Coatings	Montreal, Quebec
24 January 2004	NHL All-Stars, Milt Schmidt	49 cents	Stephane Huot	Charles Vinh, Pierre Rousseau	Lithography in 7 colours	Tullis Russell Coatings	Montreal, Quebec
29 January 2004	Tourist Attractions: Quebec Winter Carnival	49 cents	Bradbury Branding and Design	Courtesy of Carnaval de Québec	Lithography in 10 colours plus varnish	Tullis Russell Coatings	Quebec City, Quebec
16 March 2004	Governor General Ramon Hnatyshyn	49 cents	Susan Mavor	Paul Chiasson	Lithography in 4 colours plus 2 special metallic	Tullis Russell Coatings	Ottawa, Ontario
26 March 2004	Otto Sverdrup: 1854–1930	49 cents	Martin Mork, Morten Sturup, Raymond Bellemare	Martin Mork, Morten Sturup	Lithography in 4 colours plus engraving (1 colour)	Tullis Russell Coatings	Grise Fiord, Nunavut
26 March 2004	Army Cadets: 1879–2004	49 cents	Smith-Boake Designwerke Inc.	Smith-Boake Designwerke Inc.	Lithography in 8 colours	Tullis Russell Coatings	Ottawa, Ontario
30 March 2004	Urban Transit: Calgary	49 cents	Debbie Adams	Andrew Leyerle	Lithography in 10 colours	Tullis Russell Coatings	Toronto, Ontario
30 March 2004	Urban Transit: Montreal	49 cents	Debbie Adams	Andrew Leyerle	Lithography in 10 colours	Tullis Russell Coatings	Toronto, Ontario
30 March 2004	Urban Transit: Toronto Transit Commission	49 cents	Debbie Adams	Andrew Leyerle	Lithography in 10 colours	Tullis Russell Coatings	Toronto, Ontario
30 March 2004	Urban Transit: Vancouver	49 cents	Debbie Adams	Andrew Leyerle	Lithography in 10 colours	Tullis Russell Coatings	Toronto, Ontario
2 April 2004	Tourist Attractions: Saint Joseph's Oratory	49 cents	Bradbury Branding and Design	Bernard Brault	Lithography in 8 colours plus varnish	Tullis Russell Coatings	Montreal, Quebec
19 April 2004	Home Hardware	49 cents	Ron Mugford	Ron Mugford	Lithography in 6 colours	Tullis Russell Coatings	St. Jacobs, Ontario
4 May 2004	Université de Sherbrooke	49 cents	Denis L'Allier	Denis L'Allier	Lithography in 6 colours plus tag	Tullis Russell Coatings	Sherbrooke, Quebec
6 May 2004	Montreal Children's Hospital	49 cents	Monique Dufour, Sophie Lafortune	Paule Thibault	Lithography in 5 colours	Tullis Russell Coatings	Montreal, Quebec
6 May 2004	University of Prince Edward Island	49 cents	Denis L'Allier	Denis L'Allier	Lithography in 6 colours plus tag	Tullis Russell Coatings	Charlottetown, PEI
14 May 2004	John James Audubon's birds: Bohemian waxwing	49 cents	Rolf Harder	John James Audubon	Lithography in 11 colours	Tullis Russell Coatings	Montreal, Quebec
14 May 2004	John James Audubon's birds: boreal chickadee	49 cents	Rolf Harder	John James Audubon	Lithography in 11 colours	Tullis Russell Coatings	Montreal, Quebec
14 May 2004	John James Audubon's birds: ruby-crowned kinglet	49 cents	Rolf Harder	John James Audubon	Lithography in 11 colours	Tullis Russell Coatings	Montreal, Quebec
14 May 2004	John James Audubon's birds: white winged crossbill	49 cents	Rolf Harder	John James Audubon	Lithography in 11 colours	Tullis Russell Coatings	Montreal, Quebec
14 May 2004	John James Audubon's birds: Lincoln's sparrow	80 cents	Rolf Harder	John James Audubon	Lithography in 8 colours	Tullis Russell Coatings	Montreal, Quebec
28 May 2004	Sir Samuel Cunard and Sir Hugh Allan: Transatlantic Mail Service	49 cents	Oliver Hill and Dennis Page, Page & Wood Inc.	Bonnie Ross	Lithography in 5 colours plus 2 varnishes	Tullis Russell Coatings	Halifax, Nova Scotia
1 June 2004	Tourist Attractions: Montreal International Jazz Festival	49 cents	Bradbury Branding and Design	Nadia Molinari	Lithography in 8 colours plus varnish	Tullis Russell Coatings	Montreal, Quebec
6 June 2004	D-Day	49 cents	N/A	N/A	Lithography in x colours	Tullis Russell Coatings	Ottawa, Ontario
18 June 2004	Tourist Attractions: Traverse Internationale du Lac St-Jean	49 cents	Bradbury Branding and Design	Jean-François Leblanc	Lithography in 8 colours plus varnish	Tullis Russell Coatings	Montreal, Quebec
26 June 2004	French Settlement in Acadia, St. Croix Island, 1604–2004	49 cents	Fugazi	Suzanne Duranceau	Lithography in 5 colours plus steel engraving in one	Tullis Russell Coatings	Bayside, New Brunswick
19 July 2004	Tourist Attractions: Canadian National Exhibition	49 cents	Bradbury Branding and Design	Michael Rafelson	Lithography in 8 colours plus varnish	Tullis Russell Coatings	Toronto, Ontario
28 July 2004	2004 Olympic Summer Games: Spyros Louis	49 cents	Pierre-Yves Pelletier	Imagination (Photolux Studio)	Lithography in 5 colours	Tullis Russell Coatings	Montreal, Quebec
28 July 2004	2004 Olympic Summer Games: Women's Soccer	49 cents	Pierre-Yves Pelletier	Imagination (Photolux Studio)	Lithography in 5 colours	Tullis Russell Coatings	Montreal, Quebec
12 August 2004	Canadian Open Golf Championship: Driving	49 cents	Q30 DESIGN INC.	Q30 DESIGN INC.	Lithography in 8 colours plus multi-level embossing and foil (one colour)	Fasson	Oakville, Ontario
12 August 2004	Canadian Open Golf Championship: Putting	49 cents	Q30 DESIGN INC.	Q30 DESIGN INC.	Lithography in 8 colours plus multi-level embossing and foil (one colour)	Fasson	Oakville, Ontario
15 September 2004	Montreal Heart Institute	49 cents	Guénette + Delisle Design	Montreal Heart Institute	Lithography in 6 colours plus tag	Tullis Russell Coatings	Montreal, Quebec

Date of Issue	Theme	Denomination	First Day Cover Cancellation
4 October 2004	Nobel Prize Winners, Gerhard Herzberg	49 cents	tba
4 October 2004	Nobel Prize Winners, Michael Smith	49 cents	tba

== Commemorative envelopes ==
Date of Issue	Theme	Design	Quantity
13 April 2001	International Postal Hockey Tournament	Bernie Reilander	12,000
18 May 2001	Canadian Medical Protective Association	Bernie Reilander and Jayne Robertson	10,000
1 April 2004	Henry Birks and Sons	Gottschalk plus Ash International	12,000
24 April 2004	Société Philatélique de Québec	Gottschalk plus Ash International	12,000
14 June 2004	Royal College of Physicians and Surgeons of Canada	Gottschalk plus Ash International	12,000
19 June 2004	Mahone Bay: 1754–2004	Oliver Hill and Dennis Page	12,000
24 June 2004	Canadian Forces Medical Services	Gottschalk plus Ash International	12,000

== Stamp survey ==
On an annual basis, Canadian Stamp News holds an annual survey. This gives collectors the opportunity to voice their opinions on what are their favourite stamps, and least favourite stamps. The categories include: Favourite Canadian Stamps, Most Relevant Stamps, Least Favourite Stamps, Least Relevant Stamps. The results are as follows:

=== 2003 ===
==== Favourite Canadian stamps ====
Stamp	Votes	Percentage
Polar bear watching (Tourist Attractions)	296	10%
Maple tree (National Emblem)	230	8%
Volunteer Fire Fighters	203	7%
Niagara Falls (Tourist Attractions)	193	7%
RCMP Depot Division (Tourist Attractions)	186	6%
Jean-Paul Riopelle	169	6%
Year of the Goat	134	5%
Canadian Rangers	119	4%
Pedro da Silva	112	4%
Queen Elizabeth II Coronation	99	3%

==== Most relevant stamps ====
Stamp	Votes	Percentage
RCMP Depot Division (Tourist Attractions)	580	20%
Maple tree (National Emblem)	411	14%
Niagara Falls (Tourist Attractions)	403	14%
Polar bear watching (Tourist Attractions)	247	8%
Queen Elizabeth II Coronation	219	7%
Marc Garneau (Astronauts)	165	6%
Korean War	162	5%
Volunteer Fire Fighters	130	4%
Magdalen Islands (Tourist Attractions)	128	4%
Province House (Tourist Attractions)	128	4%

==== Least favourite stamps ====
Stamp	Votes	Percentage
Queen Elizabeth II Coronation	445	15%
Lutheran World Federation	358	12%
Year of the Goat	221	7%
Road World Championships	202	7%
Jean-Paul Riopelle	176	6%
Duck (Christmas)	156	5%
Korean War	105	4%
Teddy Bear (Christmas)	84	3%
Pedro da Silva	78	3%

==== Least relevant stamps ====
Stamp	Votes	Percentage
Year of the Goat	536	18%
AHEPA	506	17%
Lutheran World Federation	425	14%
Queen Elizabeth II Coronation	316	11%
Road World Championships	180	6%
Pedro da Silva	164	5%
Korean War	108	4%
Cassia Fistula	84	3%
Jean-Paul Riopelle	58	2%
Teddy Bear (Christmas)	84	3%

== Choosing Canada's stamps ==
Although Canada Post is responsible for stamp design and production, the corporation does not actually choose the subjects or the final designs that appear on stamps. That task falls under the jurisprudence of the Stamp Advisory Committee. Their objective is to recommend a balanced stamp program that will have broad-based appeal, regionally and culturally, reflecting Canadian history, heritage, and tradition.

Before Canada Post calls a meeting of the committee, it also welcomes suggestions for stamp subjects from Canadian citizens. Ideas for subjects that have recently appeared on a stamp are declined. The committee works two years in advance and can approve approximately 20 subjects for each year.

Once a stamp subject is selected, Canada Post's Stamp Products group conducts research. Designs are commissioned from two firms, both chosen for their expertise. The designs are presented anonymously to the committee. The committee's process and selection policy have changed little in the thirty years since it was introduced.

Any ideas for a stamp should be sent to: Chairperson of the Stamp Advisory Committee, Canada Post, 2701 Riverside Drive Suite N1070, Ottawa, ON, K1A 0B1.
