= Grandmaison =

Grandmaison is a surname. Notable people with the name include:

- Isabel Grandmaison de Godin (1728–1792), 18th-century woman separated from her husband by politics for over 20 years
- Adam Grandmaison (born 1983), American podcaster and YouTuber known as Adam22
- Aubin-Louis Millin de Grandmaison (1759–1818), French antiquary and naturalist
- Charles de Grandmaison (1824–1903), French archivist and historian
- Didier Lecour Grandmaison (1889–1917), World War I flying ace credited with five aerial victories
- Louis Loyzeau de Grandmaison (1861–1915), French military theorist
- Madeleine de Grandmaison (born 1938), Martinican politician, member of the Martinican Democratic Rally
- Mike Grandmaison (born 1954), Canadian freelance photographer specializing in nature
- Nicholas Raphael de Grandmaison CM RCA (1892–1978), Russian-born Canadian artist
- Olivier Le Cour Grandmaison (born 1960), French political scientist and author
- Pascal Grandmaison (born 1975), Canadian artist working in film, video, photography and sculpture
- Valerie Grandmaison (born 1988), Canadian swimmer and Paralympic champion
- François-Auguste Parseval-Grandmaison (1759–1834), French poet

== See also ==
- John A. Macdonald Memorial (Grandmaison), Canadian bronze public sculpture by Sonia de Grandmaison and John Cullen Nugent
