= Pedro da Silva (post courier) =

Postal courier

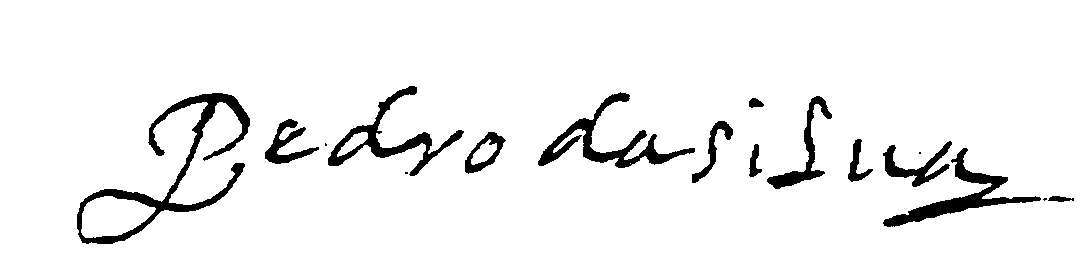
Signature of Pedro da Sylva

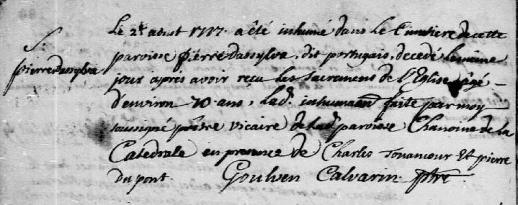
Burial record of Pedro da Silva

Pedro da Silva (Lisbon, circa 1647 - Canada, 1717) was the first post courier in New France, in what was to become part of Canada. He was Portuguese born and was known as Le Portugais (French for The Portuguese).

Pedro da Silva is known to have arrived in New France prior to 1673, having worked there as a common courier. Later on he is known to have relocated to Sault-au-Matelot (Québec City's lower town) and involved himself in the shipping of goods in the colony (by boat and cart). There is proof that in July 1693, Silva was paid 20 sols to take a package of letters from Montréal to Québec City. In 1705, he was commissioned by the (co)-Intendant of New France, Jacques Raudot, as the "first courier" in New France.

== Stamp ==
Canada Post issued a stamp (48¢) in June 2003 honouring Pedro da Silva.

== See also ==
- Postage stamps and postal history of Canada
- Portuguese Canadians
