= Canada Post stamp releases (2005–2009) =

In the latter half of the decade, Canada Post continued to issue a large number of stamps with different designs and themes. One of the key changes in the decade was that Canada Post issued series of stamps on a yearly basis. An example is the 400th anniversary of the French settlement in North America. These stamps began in 2004 and continue until 2008. Another example of an ongoing collection is the Chinese Lunar New Year stamps. The stamps have been released on an annual basis with a different animal featured every year.

Continuing the trend of putting people that are still alive on its stamps, Canada Post featured Oscar Peterson, the first member of the Order of Canada on a stamp in 2005. The year would also mark the final year of the very popular NHL legends series, which would feature legends such as 11-time Stanley Cup champion Henri Richard and Johnny Bucyk. A four stamp series in 2007 was produced with Canadian music legends. Said legends include Paul Anka, Gordon Lightfoot, Joni Mitchell, and Anne Murray, with the stamps printed on a MetalFX process.

Please see Canada Post stamp releases (2000–2004) for any stamps produced between 2000–2004.

== 2005 ==
Date of Issue	Theme	Denomination	Design	Illustration	Printing Process	Paper Type	First Day Cover Cancellation
7 January 2005	Year of the Rooster	50 cents	Hélène L'Heureux	Hélène L'Heureux	Lithography in 6 colours plus 2 foil stampings, embossing and tagging	Tullis Russell Coatings	Vancouver, BC
7 January 2005	Year of the Rooster	$1.45	Hélène L'Heureux	Hélène L'Heureux	Lithography in 8 colours plus satin gold, gloss gold, and red pigment foil stamping plus embossing	Tullis Russell Coatings	Vancouver, BC
29 January 2005	NHL All-Stars, John Bucyk	$0.50	Stéphane Huot	François Escalmel, Pierre Rousseau	Lithography in 7 colours	Tullis Russell Coatings	Edmonton, Alberta
29 January 2005	NHL All-Stars, Grant Fuhr	$0.50	Stéphane Huot	François Escalmel, Pierre Rousseau	Lithography in 7 colours	Tullis Russell Coatings	Edmonton, Alberta
29 January 2005	NHL All-Stars, Pierre Pilote	$0.50	Stéphane Huot	François Escalmel, Pierre Rousseau	Lithography in 7 colours	Tullis Russell Coatings	Edmonton, Alberta
29 January 2005	NHL All-Stars, Henri Richard	$0.50	Stéphane Huot	François Escalmel, Pierre Rousseau	Lithography in 7 colours	Tullis Russell Coatings	Edmonton, Alberta
29 January 2005	NHL All-Stars, Allan Stanley	$0.50	Stéphane Huot	François Escalmel, Pierre Rousseau	Lithography in 7 colours	Tullis Russell Coatings	Edmonton, Alberta
29 January 2005	NHL All-Stars, Bryan Trottier	$0.50	Stéphane Huot	François Escalmel, Pierre Rousseau	Lithography in 7 colours	Tullis Russell Coatings	Edmonton, Alberta
4 February 2005	Fishing Flies, The Alevin	$0.50	Circle Design Inc.	Alain Massicotte	Lithography in 8 colours	Tullis Russell Coatings	Granby, QC
4 February 2005	Fishing Flies, Jock Scott	$0.50	Circle Design Inc.	Alain Massicotte	Lithography in 8 colours	Tullis Russell Coatings	Granby, QC
4 February 2005	Fishing Flies, The Mickey Finn	$0.50	Circle Design Inc.	Alain Massicotte	Lithography in 8 colours	Tullis Russell Coatings	Granby, QC
4 February 2005	Fishing Flies, The P.E.I.	$0.50	Circle Design Inc.	Alain Massicotte	Lithography in 8 colours	Tullis Russell Coatings	Granby, QC
14 February 2005	Nova Scotia Agricultural College	$0.50	Denis L'Allier	Guy Lavigueur	Lithography in 6 colours	Fasson	Truro, Nova Scotia
4 March 2005	Expo 2005: The Wisdom of Diversity	$0.50	HM&E Design	Curtis Lantinga	Lithography in 9 colours	Tullis Russell Coatings	Vancouver, BC
10 March 2005	Daffodils: Yellow	$0.50	Isabelle Toussaint	Marc Montplaisir	Lithography in 4 colours	Fasson	Vancouver, BC
23 March 2005	John James Audubon's Birds: Horned Lark	$0.50	Rolf Harder	John James Audubon	Lithography in 10 colours	Tullis Russell Coatings	Fredericton, New Brunswick
23 March 2005	John James Audubon's Birds: Piping Plover	$0.50	Rolf Harder	John James Audubon	Lithography in 10 colours	Tullis Russell Coatings	Fredericton, New Brunswick
23 March 2005	John James Audubon's Birds: Stilt Sandpiper	$0.50	Rolf Harder	John James Audubon	Lithography in 10 colours	Tullis Russell Coatings	Fredericton, New Brunswick
23 March 2005	John James Audubon's Birds: Willow Ptarmigan	$0.50	Rolf Harder	John James Audubon	Lithography in 10 colours	Tullis Russell Coatings	Fredericton, New Brunswick
2 April 2005	Bridges: Angus L. MacDonald Bridge	$0.50	Designwerke Inc., Andrew Perro	Sid Tabak	Lithography in 10 colours	Tullis Russell Coatings	Montreal, QC and Halifax, NS
2 April 2005	Bridges: Canso Causeway	$0.50	Designwerke Inc., Andrew Perro	Sid Tabak	Lithography in 10 colours	Tullis Russell Coatings	Montreal, QC and Halifax, NS
2 April 2005	Bridges: Pont Jacques Cartier	$0.50	Designwerke Inc., Andrew Perro	Sid Tabak	Lithography in 10 colours	Tullis Russell Coatings	Montreal, QC and Halifax, NS
2 April 2005	Bridges: Souris Swinging Bridge	$0.50	Designwerke Inc., Andrew Perro	Sid Tabak	Lithography in 10 colours	Tullis Russell Coatings	Montreal, QC and Halifax, NS
12 April 2005	MacLean's Magazine: 1905-2005	$0.50	52 Pick-up Inc.	52 Pick-up Inc.	Lithography in 6 colours plus spot varnish	Tullis Russell Coatings	Toronto, ON
22 April 2005	Biosphere Reserves: Waterton Lakes National Park (Canada/Ireland Joint Issue)	$0.50	Xerxes Irani	Jeff Spokes and An Post	Lithography in 9 colours	Tullis Russell Coatings	Waterton Park, AB
22 April 2005	Biosphere Reserves: Killarney National Park (Canada/Ireland Joint Issue)	$0.50	Xerxes Irani	Jeff Spokes and An Post	Lithography in 9 colours	Tullis Russell Coatings	Waterton Park, AB
29 April 2005	Battle of the Atlantic	$0.50	Derek Sarty	National Archives of Canada/Maritime Command Museum	Lithography in 8 colours plus varnish	Tullis Russell Coatings	Halifax, NS
6 May 2005	Canadian War Museum	$0.50	Tilt Telmet and Marko Barac	Canadian War Museum	Lithography in 9 colours plus varnish	Tullis Russell Coatings	Ottawa, ON
27 May 2005	Art Canada: Homer Watson, 1855–1936	$0.50	Hélène L'Heureux	Hélène L'Heureux	Lithography in 8 colours	Tullis Russell Coatings	Kitchener, ON
13 June 2005	Search and Rescue: Alpine Rescue	$0.50	François Dallaire	Space Imaging, Guy Lavigueur, Reuters/Corbis, Canadian Coast Guard Maritime Search and Rescue, Newfoundland and Labrador Region	Lithography in 10 colours	Tullis Russell Coatings	Victoria, BC
13 June 2005	Search and Rescue: Ground Rescue with Dog	$0.50	François Dallaire	Space Imaging, Guy Lavigueur, Reuters/Corbis, Canadian Coast Guard Maritime Search and Rescue, Newfoundland and Labrador Region	Lithography in 10 colours	Tullis Russell Coatings	Victoria, BC
13 June 2005	Search and Rescue: Rescue by Air	$0.50	François Dallaire	Space Imaging, Guy Lavigueur, Reuters/Corbis, Canadian Coast Guard Maritime Search and Rescue, Newfoundland and Labrador Region	Lithography in 10 colours	Tullis Russell Coatings	Victoria, BC
13 June 2005	Search and Rescue: Rescue from the Sea	$0.50	François Dallaire	Space Imaging, Guy Lavigueur, Reuters/Corbis, Canadian Coast Guard Maritime Search and Rescue, Newfoundland and Labrador Region	Lithography in 10 colours	Tullis Russell Coatings	Victoria, BC
21 June 2005	Ellen Fairclough	$0.50	Katalin Kovats	Murray Mosher, Roy Arthur	Lithography in 6 colours	Tullis Russell Coatings	Hamilton, Ontario

Year of Issue	Theme	Denomination	First Day Cover Cancellation
5 July 2005	XI FINA World Championships	50 cents	tba
16 July 2005	Port Royal	50 cents	tba
21 July 2005	Alberta Centennial	50 cents	tba
2 August 2005	Saskatchewan Centennial	50 cents	tba
15 August 2005	Acadian Deportation	50 cents	tba
15 August 2005	Oscar Peterson	50 cents	tba
2 September 2005	Polio Vaccination	50 cents	tba
1 October 2005	Youth Sports	50 cents	tba
13 October 2005	Big Cats: Amur Leopard (Canada/China Joint Issue)	50 cents	tba
13 October 2005	Big Cats: Canadian Cougar (Canada/China Joint Issue)	50 cents	tba
2 November 2005	Christmas – Crèches	50 cents	tba
2 November 2005	Christmas - Snowman	50 cents	tba
21 October 2004	Victoria Cross	49 cents	tba

== 2006 ==
Queen Elizabeth II Definitive stamp

Year of Issue	Theme	Denomination
2006	Spotted Coralroot Flower	51 cents
2006	XX Olympic Winter Games	51 cents
2006	Year of the Dog	51 cents

Date of Issue	Theme	Denomination	Design	Illustration	Printing Process	Paper Type	First Day Cover Cancellation
3 April 2006	Birthday	51 cents	Designwerke Inc., Andrew Perro	Designwerke Inc., Andrew Perro	Lithography in 8 colours	Tullis Russell Coatings	Ottawa, Ontario
7 April 2006	Dorothy Knowles	51 cents	Hélène L'Heureux	N/A	Lithography in 9 colours	Tullis Russell Coatings	Unity, Saskatchewan
20 April 2006	Canadian Labour Congress: 1956-2006	51 cents	Steven Spazuk	Marc Montplaisir	Lithography in 7 colours	Tullis Russell Coatings	Ottawa, Ontario
20 April 2006	Queen Elizabeth II, 80th Birthday	51 cents	q30 design inc.	Department of Canadian Heritage	Lithography in 7 colours	Fasson	Ottawa, Ontario
26 April 2006	McClelland and Stewart: 1906-2006	51 cents	James Roberts, Overdrive Design Ltd.	James Roberts, Overdrive Design Ltd.	Lithography in 2 colours	Tullis Russell Coatings	Toronto, Ontario
26 April 2006	Canadian Museum of Civilization	51 cents	Neville Smith	Canadian Museum of Civilization	Lithography in 6 colours	Tullis Russell Coatings	Gatineau, Quebec
26 May 2006	Canadians in Hollywood, John Candy	51 cents	John Belisle, Kosta Tsetsekas	Neal Armstrong	Lithography in 5 colours plus 2 varnishes	Tullis Russell Coatings	Toronto, ON and Vancouver, BC
26 May 2006	Canadians in Hollywood, Lorne Greene	51 cents	John Belisle, Kosta Tsetsekas	Neal Armstrong	Lithography in 5 colours plus 2 varnishes	Tullis Russell Coatings	Toronto, ON and Vancouver, BC
26 May 2006	Canadians in Hollywood, Mary Pickford	51 cents	John Belisle, Kosta Tsetsekas	Neal Armstrong	Lithography in 5 colours plus 2 varnishes	Tullis Russell Coatings	Toronto, ON and Vancouver, BC
26 May 2006	Canadians in Hollywood, Fay Wray	51 cents	John Belisle, Kosta Tsetsekas	Neal Armstrong	Lithography in 5 colours plus 2 varnishes	Tullis Russell Coatings	Toronto, ON and Vancouver, BC
28 May 2006	Champlain surveys the East Coast	51 cents	Fugazi	Francis Back, Martin Cote	Lithography in 6 colours plus 1 intaglio	Tullis Russell Coatings	Annapolis Royal, Nova Scotia
15 June 2006	Vancouver Aquarium: 1906-2006	51 cents	Kevin van der Leek	Grant Faint	Lithography in 7 colours plus varnish	Tullis Russell Coatings	Vancouver, British Columbia
28 June 2006	Canadian Forces: Snowbirds: 1971–2006, Pilot's Cockpit	51 cents	Wade Stewart and Tiit Telmet	E.J. van Koningsveld and Rafe Tomsett	Lithography in 9 colours	Tullis Russell Coatings	Moose Jaw, Saskatchewan
28 June 2006	Canadian Forces: Snowbirds: 1971–2006, Three planes	51 cents	Wade Stewart and Tiit Telmet	E.J. van Koningsveld and Rafe Tomsett	Lithography in 9 colours	Tullis Russell Coatings	Moose Jaw, Saskatchewan
30 June 2006	Atlas of Canada	51 cents	Karen Smith, Trivium Design Inc.	Ivan Murphy	Lithography in 9 colours	Tullis Russell Coatings	Ottawa, Ontario
6 July 2006	World Lacrosse Championships	51 cents	Tom Yakobina	Yvan Meunier	Lithography in 6 colours	Tullis Russell Coatings	London, Ontario
19 July 2006	Mountaineering	51 cents	Xerxes Irani	Whyte Museum, Getty Images	Lithography in 7 colours with spot gloss varnish	Tullis Russell Coatings	Canmore, Alberta
3 August 2006	Duck Decoys, Barrow's Golden Eye	51 cents	Oliver Hill and Dennis Page	Pierre Leduc	Lithography in 4 colours	Tullis Russell Coatings	Smiths Falls, Ontario
3 August 2006	Duck Decoys, Black Duck	51 cents	Oliver Hill and Dennis Page	Pierre Leduc	Lithography in 4 colours	Tullis Russell Coatings	Smiths Falls, Ontario
3 August 2006	Duck Decoys, Mallard	51 cents	Oliver Hill and Dennis Page	Pierre Leduc	Lithography in 4 colours	Tullis Russell Coatings	Smiths Falls, Ontario
3 August 2006	Duck Decoys, Red Breasted Merganser	51 cents	Oliver Hill and Dennis Page	Pierre Leduc	Lithography in 4 colours	Tullis Russell Coatings	Smiths Falls, Ontario
16 August 2006	Society of Graphic Designers of Canada	51 cents	David Coates, Rod Roodenburg, Len-Nard Yambot	David Coates, Rod Roodenburg, Len-Nard Yambot	Lithography in 5 colours	Tullis Russell Coatings	Toronto, Ontario
23 August 2006	Wine and Cheese, Cheese Wedge	51 cents	Derwyn Goodall	Robert Wigington	Lithography in 8 colours	Tullis Russell Coatings	St. Catharines, Ontario
23 August 2006	Wine and Cheese, Wine Labels	51 cents	Derwyn Goodall	Robert Wigington	Lithography in 8 colours	Tullis Russell Coatings	St. Catharines, Ontario
26 September 2006	Macdonald College	51 cents	Denis L'Allier	Guy Lavigueur	Lithography in 6 colours	Tullis Russell Coatings	Sainte-Anne-de-Bellevue, Quebec
29 September 2006	Endangered Species, Blotched Tiger Salamander	51 cents	Sputnik Design Partners	Doug Martin (iZiart)	Lithography in 8 colours	Tullis Russell Coatings	Calgary, Alberta
29 September 2006	Endangered Species, Blue Racer	51 cents	Sputnik Design Partners	Doug Martin (iZiart)	Lithography in 8 colours	Tullis Russell Coatings	Calgary, Alberta
29 September 2006	Endangered Species, Newfoundland Marten	51 cents	Sputnik Design Partners	Doug Martin (iZiart)	Lithography in 8 colours	Tullis Russell Coatings	Calgary, Alberta
29 September 2006	Endangered Species, Swift Fox	51 cents	Sputnik Design Partners	Doug Martin (iZiart)	Lithography in 8 colours	Tullis Russell Coatings	Calgary, Alberta
17 October 2006	Opera, Maureen Forrester	51 cents	Paul Haslip and Judith Lacerte	Alanna Cavanagh	Lithography in 11 colours	Tullis Russell Coatings	Toronto, Ontario
17 October 2006	Opera, Raoul Jobin	51 cents	Paul Haslip and Judith Lacerte	Alanna Cavanagh	Lithography in 11 colours	Tullis Russell Coatings	Toronto, Ontario
17 October 2006	Opera, Edward Johnson	51 cents	Paul Haslip and Judith Lacerte	Alanna Cavanagh	Lithography in 11 colours	Tullis Russell Coatings	Toronto, Ontario
17 October 2006	Opera, Léopold Simoneau and Pierrette Alarie	51 cents	Paul Haslip and Judith Lacerte	Alanna Cavanagh	Lithography in 11 colours	Tullis Russell Coatings	Toronto, Ontario
17 October 2006	Opera, Jon Vickers	51 cents	Paul Haslip and Judith Lacerte	Alanna Cavanagh	Lithography in 11 colours	Tullis Russell Coatings	Toronto, Ontario
1 November 2006	Madonna and Child	51 cents	Pierre Fontaine	Patrick Altman	Lithography in 6 colours plus varnish	Tullis Russell Coatings	Noel, Nova Scotia
1 November 2006	Christmas Cards	51 cents	Peter Steiner	Yvonne McKague Housser, J.E. Sampson, Edwin Holgate	Lithography in 7 colours	Tullis Russell Coatings	Noel, Nova Scotia
1 November 2006	Christmas Cards	89 cents	Peter Steiner	Yvonne McKague Housser, J.E. Sampson, Edwin Holgate	Lithography in 6 colours	Tullis Russell Coatings	Noel, Nova Scotia
1 November 2006	Christmas Cards	$1.49	Peter Steiner	Yvonne McKague Housser, J.E. Sampson, Edwin Holgate	Lithography in 7 colours	Tullis Russell Coatings	Noel, Nova Scotia
16 November 2006	Definitives: Flag, Bras d'Or Lake	Non-denominated	Larry Fisher, Johnny Johnson, I.K. MacNeil	G. Klassen, David Nunuk, J. David Andrews	Lithography in 5 colours	Tullis Russell Coatings	Ottawa, ON
16 November 2006	Definitives: Flag, Chemainus, BC	Non-denominated	Larry Fisher, Johnny Johnson, I.K. MacNeil	G. Klassen, David Nunuk, J. David Andrews	Lithography in 5 colours	Tullis Russell Coatings	Ottawa, ON
16 November 2006	Definitives: Flag, Churchill, Manitoba	Non-denominated	Larry Fisher, Johnny Johnson, I.K. MacNeil	G. Klassen, David Nunuk, J. David Andrews	Lithography in 5 colours	Tullis Russell Coatings	Ottawa, ON
16 November 2006	Definitives: Flag, Sirmilik National Park	Non-denominated	Larry Fisher, Johnny Johnson, I.K. MacNeil	G. Klassen, David Nunuk, J. David Andrews	Lithography in 5 colours	Tullis Russell Coatings	Ottawa, ON
16 November 2006	Definitives: Flag, Tuktut Nogait National Park	Non-denominated	Larry Fisher, Johnny Johnson, I.K. MacNeil	G. Klassen, David Nunuk, J. David Andrews	Lithography in 5 colours	Tullis Russell Coatings	Ottawa, ON
16 November 2006	Definitives: Flowers	Non-denominated	Monique Dufour, Sophie Lafortune	Pifko	Lithography in 5 colours	Tullis Russell Coatings	Ottawa, ON
16 November 2006	Definitives: Queen Elizabeth II	Non-denominated	q30 design inc.	Department of Canadian Heritage	Lithography in 5 colours	Fasson	Ottawa, ON

== 2007 ==
Date of Issue	Theme	Denomination	Design	Illustration	Printing Process	Paper Type	First Day Cover Cancellation
5 January 2007	Year of the Pig	52 cents	John Belisle, Kosta Tsetsekas	John Belisle	Lithography in 8 colours with two foil stampings	Tullis Russell Coatings	Toronto, ON
5 January 2007	Year of the Pig	$1.55	John Belisle, Kosta Tsetsekas	John Belisle	Lithography in 8 colours with two foil stampings	Tullis Russell Coatings	Toronto, ON
15 January 2007	Celebration	52 cents	Karen Smith, Trivium Design Inc.	Robert George Young	Lithography in 9 colours	Tullis Russell Coatings	Ottawa, ON
12 February 2007	International Polar Year	52 cents	q30 design inc.	Rothrock, DA, Y. Yu and G.A. Maykut	Lithography in 9 colours	Tullis Russell Coatings	Igloolik, NU
1 March 2007	Lilacs	52 cents	Isabelle Toussaint	Isabelle Toussaint	Lithography in 4 colours and spot varnish	Tullis Russell Coatings	Cornwall, ON
12 March 2007	HEC Montreal	52 cents	Denis L'Allier	Guy Lavigueur	Lithography in 6 colours	Tullis Russell Coatings	Montreal, QC
12 March 2007	Mary Pratt	52 cents	Hélène L'Heureux	Hélène L'Heureux	Lithography in 10 colours	Tullis Russell Coatings	St. John's, NL
3 April 2007	University of Saskatchewan	52 cents	Denis L'Allier	Guy Lavigueur	Lithography in 6 colours	Tullis Russell Coatings	Saskatoon, SK
3 May 2007	Ottawa: 1857-2007	52 cents	John McQuarrie	Clive Branson	Lithography in 7 colours	Tullis Russell Coatings	Ottawa, ON
9 May 2007	Royal Architectural Institute of Canada: 1907–2007, University of Lethbridge	52 cents	Ivan Novotny and TaylorSprules Corporation	Various	Lithography in 8 colours	Tullis Russell Coatings	Ottawa, ON
9 May 2007	Royal Architectural Institute of Canada: 1907–2007, St. Mary's Church	52 cents	Ivan Novotny and TaylorSprules Corporation	Various	Lithography in 8 colours	Tullis Russell Coatings	Ottawa, ON
9 May 2007	Royal Architectural Institute of Canada: 1907–2007, Ontario Science Centre	52 cents	Ivan Novotny and TaylorSprules Corporation	Various	Lithography in 8 colours	Tullis Russell Coatings	Ottawa, ON
9 May 2007	Royal Architectural Institute of Canada: 1907–2007, National Art Gallery of Canada	52 cents	Ivan Novotny and TaylorSprules Corporation	Various	Lithography in 8 colours	Tullis Russell Coatings	Ottawa, ON
22 June 2007	Captain George Vancouver, 1757–2007	$1.55	Niko Potton, Fleming Design	Niko Potton	Lithography in 7 colours plus embossing	Tullis Russell Coatings	Vancouver, BC
26 June 2007	FIFA U-20 World Cup Canada 2007	52 cents	Debbie Adams	Dale MacMillan	Lithography in 8 colours	Tullis Russell Coatings	Toronto, ON
29 June 2007	Canadian Recording Artists Paul Anka	52 cents	Circle Design Inc.	Photo from EMI Canada	Lithography in 9 colours	Lowe-Martin	Toronto, ON
29 June 2007	Canadian Recording Artists Gordon Lightfoot	52 cents	Circle Design Inc.	Photo from John Reeves	Lithography in 9 colours	Lowe-Martin	Toronto, ON
29 June 2007	Canadian Recording Artists Joni Mitchell	52 cents	Circle Design Inc.	Photo from Gregory Heisler	Lithography in 9 colours	Lowe-Martin	Toronto, ON
29 June 2007	Canadian Recording Artists Anne Murray	52 cents	Circle Design Inc.	Photo from Monic Richard	Lithography in 9 colours	Lowe-Martin	Toronto, ON
6 July 2007	Terra Nova National Park	52 cents	Saskia van Kampen	Vlasta van Kampen	Lithography in 6 colours	Tullis Russell	Glovertown, Newfoundland
20 July 2007	Jasper National Park	52 cents	Saskia van Kampen	Vlasta van Kampen	Lithography in 6 colours	Tullis Russell	Jasper, Alberta
25 July 2007	100 Years of Scouting	52 cents	Matthias Reinicke Lime Design Inc.	Various Photos	Lithography in 8 colours	Tullis Russell	Tamaracouta, QC
26 July 2007	Chief Membertou	52 cents	Fugazi	Suzanne Duranceau	3 colours intaglio	Tullis Russell	St. Peter's, Nova Scotia
13 September 2007	Law Society of Saskatchewan	52 cents	Bradbury Branding Design Inc.	Bradbury Branding Design Inc., Photos from Keith Moulding and Glenbow Archives	Lithography in 5 colours	Tullis Russell	Regina, Saskatchewan
13 September 2007	Law Society of Alberta	52 cents	Xerxes Irani	Photos from Jason Stang, The Legal Archives Society of Alberta	Lithography in 8 colours	Tullis Russell	Edmonton, Alberta
1 October 2007	Endangered Species (Leatherback Turtle)	52 cents	Sputnik Design Partners Inc.	Doug Martin (iZiart)	Lithography in 8 colours	Tullis Russell Coatings	Halifax, Nova Scotia
1 October 2007	Endangered Species (White Sturgeon)	52 cents	Sputnik Design Partners Inc.	Doug Martin (iZiart)	Lithography in 8 colours	Tullis Russell Coatings	Halifax, Nova Scotia
1 October 2007	Endangered Species (North Atlantic Right Whale)	52 cents	Sputnik Design Partners Inc.	Doug Martin (iZiart)	Lithography in 8 colours	Tullis Russell Coatings	Halifax, Nova Scotia
1 October 2007	Endangered Species (Northern Cricket Frog)	52 cents	Sputnik Design Partners Inc.	Doug Martin (iZiart)	Lithography in 8 colours	Tullis Russell Coatings	Halifax, Nova Scotia
12 October 2007	Low Value Definitives: Beneficial Insects (Hippodamia Convergens)	1 cent	Keith Martin	Keith Martin	Lithography in 5 colours	Tullis Russell Coatings	Beeton, Ontario
12 October 2007	Low Value Definitives: Beneficial Insects (Chrysopa Oculata)	3 cents	Keith Martin	Keith Martin	Lithography in 5 colours	Tullis Russell Coatings	Beeton, Ontario
12 October 2007	Low Value Definitives: Beneficial Insects (Bombus Polaris)	5 cents	Keith Martin	Keith Martin	Lithography in 5 colours	Tullis Russell Coatings	Beeton, Ontario
12 October 2007	Low Value Definitives: Beneficial Insects (Aeshna Canadensis)	10 cents	Keith Martin	Keith Martin	Lithography in 5 colours	Tullis Russell Coatings	Beeton, Ontario
12 October 2007	Low Value Definitives: Beneficial Insects (Hyalophra cecropia)	25 cents	Keith Martin	Keith Martin	Lithography in 5 colours	Tullis Russell Coatings	Beeton, Ontario
1 November 2007	Christmas: Reindeer	Permanent	Hélène L'Heureux	Hélène L'Heureux	Lithography in 5 colours plus 1 clear holographic stamping	Tullis Russell Coatings	Tuktoyaktuk, Northwest Territories
1 November 2007	Christmas: Hope, Joy and Peace	Permanent	Tandem Design Associates Inc.	Stephanie Carter, Steve Hepburn, Jonathan Milne	Lithography in 5 colours	Tullis Russell Coatings	Hope, British Columbia
1 November 2007	Christmas: Hope, Joy and Peace	93 cents	Tandem Design Associates Inc.	Stephanie Carter, Steve Hepburn, Jonathan Milne	Lithography in 5 colours	Tullis Russell Coatings	Ange-Gardien, Quebec
1 November 2007	Christmas: Hope, Joy and Peace	$1.55	Tandem Design Associates Inc.	Stephanie Carter, Steve Hepburn, Jonathan Milne	Lithography in 5 colours	Tullis Russell Coatings	Peace River, Alberta
27 December 2007	Definitives:Flowers - Orchids (Odontioda Island Red)	Permanent	Monique Dufour, Sophie Lafortune	Pifko	Lithography in 5 colours	Tullis Russell Coatings	Bloomfield Station, PEI
27 December 2007	Definitives:Flowers - Orchids (Potinara Fire Dancer)	96 cents	Monique Dufour, Sophie Lafortune	Pifko	Lithography in 5 colours	Tullis Russell Coatings	Bloomfield Station, PEI
27 December 2007	Definitives:Flowers - Orchids (Laeliocattlyea Memoria Evelyn Light)	One dollar and fifteen cents	Monique Dufour, Sophie Lafortune	Pifko	Lithography in 5 colours	Tullis Russell Coatings	Bloomfield Station, PEI
27 December 2007	Definitives:Flowers - Orchids (Masdevallia Kaleidoscope Conni)	One dollar and sixty cents	Monique Dufour, Sophie Lafortune	Pifko	Lithography in 5 colours	Tullis Russell Coatings	Bloomfield Station, PEI
27 December 2007	Definitives:Queen Elizabeth II	Permanent (Spicer Type Paper)	Gottschalk + Ash International	Dept of Cdn Heritage, Headlight Inc. Background, Corbis First Light	Lithography in 5 colours	Canadian Bank Note	Bjorkdale, Saskatchewan
27 December 2007	Definitives:Flag (Lighthouses) – Point Clark, Ontario	Permanent	Gottschalk + Ash International	First Light, All Canada Photos	Lithography in 5 colours	Canadian Bank Note	Sambro, Nova Scotia
27 December 2007	Definitives:Flag (Lighthouses) – Pachena Point, BC	Permanent	Gottschalk + Ash International	First Light, All Canada Photos	Lithography in 5 colours	Canadian Bank Note	Sambro, Nova Scotia
27 December 2007	Definitives:Flag (Lighthouses) – Warren Landing, Manitoba	Permanent	Gottschalk + Ash International	First Light, All Canada Photos	Lithography in 5 colours	Canadian Bank Note	Sambro, Nova Scotia
27 December 2007	Definitives:Flag (Lighthouses) – Cap-des-Rosiers, Quebec	Permanent	Gottschalk + Ash International	First Light, All Canada Photos	Lithography in 5 colours	Canadian Bank Note	Sambro, Nova Scotia
27 December 2007	Definitives:Flag (Lighthouses) – Sambro Island, Nova Scotia	Permanent	Gottschalk + Ash International	First Light, All Canada Photos, Chris Mills	Lithography in 5 colours	Canadian Bank Note	Sambro, Nova Scotia

== 2008 ==
Date of Issue	Theme	Denomination	Design	Illustration	Printing Process	Paper Type	First Day Cover Cancellation
5 January 2008	Year of the Rat	52 cents	Tandem Design Associates	Harvey Chan	Lithography in 9 colours plus 1 pearlescent foil and one gold foil stampings and embossing	Tullis Russell Coatings	Vancouver, BC
5 January 2008	Year of the Rat	One dollar and sixty cents	Tandem Design Associates	Harvey Chan	Lithography in 9 colours plus 1 pearlescent foil and one gold foil stampings and embossing	Tullis Russell Coatings	Vancouver, BC
15 January 2008	Celebration	Permanent	Michael Zavacky, McMillan	Michael Zavacky, McMillan	Lithography in 7 colours	Lowe-Martin	Zeballos, BC
3 March 2008	Peonies (The Elgin)	52 cents	Isabelle Toussaint	Isabelle Toussaint	Lithography in 6 colours	Tullis-Russell	Oakville, ON
3 March 2008	Peonies (Coral 'n Gold)	52 cents	Isabelle Toussaint	Isabelle Toussaint	Lithography in 6 colours	Tullis-Russell	Oakville, ON
7 March 2008	University of Alberta	52 cents	Metaform Communication Design	Creative Services, University of Alberta	Lithography in 8 colours	Tullis-Russell	Edmonton, Alberta
7 March 2008	University of British Columbia	52 cents	Metaform Communication Design	Martin Dee, UBC Public Affairs	Lithography in 4 colours	Tullis-Russell	Vancouver, British Columbia
3 April 2008	IIHF World Championships, Quebec City	52 cents	Lionel Gadoury, Dave Hurds	Ho Che Anderson	Lithography in 7 colours	Tullis Russell Coatings	Québec City, QC
3 April 2008	IIHF World Championships, Halifax	52 cents	Lionel Gadoury, Dave Hurds	Ho Che Anderson	Lithography in 7 colours	Tullis Russell Coatings	Halifax, NS
21 April 2008	Guide Dogs	52 cents	Designwerke Inc., Andrew Perro	J. Christopher Lawson	Lithography in 4 colours plus varnish	Tullis Russell Coatings	Ottawa, Ontario
2 May 2008	Oil and Gas: Calgary, Alberta	52 cents	Tim Nokes	Neil Petrunia	Lithography in 6 colours	Tullis Russell Coatings	Calgary, Alberta
2 May 2008	Oil and Gas: Oil Springs	52 cents	Tim Nokes	Neil Petrunia	Lithography in 6 colours	Tullis Russell Coatings	Oil Springs, Ontario
16 May 2008	Founding of Quebec City	52 cents	Fugazi	Francis Back, Jorge Peral	Lithography in 1 colour and 3 colours intaglio	Tullis Russell Coatings	Québec City, QC
21 May 2008	Yousuf Karsh	52 cents	Hélène L'Heureux	Photos from the Karsh Estate	Lithography in 6 colours plus varnish	Tullis Russell Coatings	Ottawa, Ontario
21 May 2008	Audrey Hepburn	96 cents	Hélène L'Heureux	Photos from the Karsh Estate	Lithography in 6 colours plus varnish	Tullis Russell Coatings	Ottawa, Ontario
21 May 2008	Winston Churchill	One Dollar and Sixty Cents	Hélène L'Heureux	Photos from the Karsh Estate	Lithography in 6 colours plus varnish	Tullis Russell Coatings	Ottawa, Ontario
4 June 2008	Royal Canadian Mint, 100th Anniversary	Fifty-two cents	Stéphane Huot	Normand Robert	Lithography in 6 colours and embossing	Tullis Russell Coatings	Ottawa, Ontario
4 June 2008	Canadian Nurses Association	Fifty-two cents	Gottschalk and Ash International	Laura Arsie Photography	Lithography in 8 colours	Tullis Russell Coatings	Ottawa, Ontario
20 June 2008	Anne of Green Gables (Anne stamp)	Fifty-two cents	Dennis Page, Oliver Hill	Christopher Kovacs/Ben Stahl	Lithography in 7 colours	Tullis Russell Coatings	Cavendish, Prince Edward Island
20 June 2008	Anne of Green Gables (Gables stamp)	Fifty-two cents	Dennis Page, Oliver Hill	Christopher Kovacs/Ben Stahl	Lithography in 7 colours	Tullis Russell Coatings	Avonlea, Prince Edward Island
30 June 2008	Canadians in Hollywood: Raymond Burr	Fifty-two cents	Josh Belisle, Kosta Tsetsekas, Geoff Kehrig	Neal Armstrong, Adam Rogers	Lithography in 5 colours plus varnish	Spicers	Montreal, QC and Vancouver, BC
30 June 2008	Canadians in Hollywood: Marie Dressler	Fifty-two cents	Josh Belisle, Kosta Tsetsekas, Geoff Kehrig	Neal Armstrong, Adam Rogers	Lithography in 5 colours plus varnish	Spicers	Montreal, QC and Vancouver, BC
30 June 2008	Canadians in Hollywood: Chief Dan George	Fifty-two cents	Josh Belisle, Kosta Tsetsekas, Geoff Kehrig	Neal Armstrong, Adam Rogers	Lithography in 5 colours plus varnish	Spicers	Montreal, QC and Vancouver, BC
30 June 2008	Canadians in Hollywood: Norma Shearer	Fifty-two cents	Josh Belisle, Kosta Tsetsekas, Geoff Kehrig	Neal Armstrong, Adam Rogers	Lithography in 5 colours plus varnish	Spicers	Montreal, QC and Vancouver, BC
18 July 2008	Games of the XXIX Olympiad	Fifty-two cents	q30design inc.	Laurie Lafrance	Lithography in 6 colours	Tullis Russell	Golden, BC
25 July 2008	Lifesaving Society: 1908-2008	Fifty-two cents	Derwin Goodall	Lorne Bridgman, Getty Images	Lithography in 7 colours plus varnish	Tullis Russell	Toronto, ON
1 August 2008	150th Anniversary, British Columbia	Fifty-two cents	Subplot Design Inc.	Clinton Hussey and Adam Rogers	Lithography in 6 colours plus varnish	Tullis Russell	Fort Langley, BC
8 September 2008	Sam McLaughlin, Founder of General Motors Canada	Fifty-two cents	Tilt Telmet, Marko Barac	Bill McKague, Thomas Bouckley Collection	Lithography in 7 colours	Tullis Russell	Oshawa, ON
1 October 2008	Endangered Species, Taylor's checkerspot	52 cents	Sputnik Design Partners	Doug Martin	Lithography in 9 colours	Tullis Russell Coatings	Moose Jaw, SK
1 October 2008	Endangered Species, Roseate Tern	52 cents	Sputnik Design Partners	Doug Martin	Lithography in 9 colours	Tullis Russell Coatings	Moose Jaw, SK
1 October 2008	Endangered Species, Peculiar Burrowing Owl	52 cents	Sputnik Design Partners	Doug Martin	Lithography in 9 colours	Tullis Russell Coatings	Moose Jaw, SK
1 October 2008	Endangered Species, Prothonotary Warbler	52 cents	Sputnik Design Partners	Doug Martin	Lithography in 9 colours	Tullis Russell Coatings	Moose Jaw, SK
6 October 2008	Mental Health	Semi-postal (Permanent Stamp plus 10-cent surcharge)	Paul Haslip	Photo by Nigel Dickson	Lithography in 6 colours	Tullis Russell Coatings	Ottawa, ON
15 October 2008	XII Summit de la Francophonie	52 cents	Ian Drolet	Photo by Marc-André Grenier	Lithography in 7 colours plus varnish	Tullis Russell Coatings	Québec, QC
3 November 2008	Christmas: The Nativity	Permanent	Joseph Gault	Antonio Caruso (sculptor)	Lithography in 6 colours	Tullis Russell Coatings	Sainte Anne de Beaupre, QC
3 November 2008	Christmas: Winter Fun (Domestic)	Permanent	Susan Scott	Susan Scott	Lithography in 8 colours	Tullis Russell Coatings	Snowflake, Manitoba
3 November 2008	Christmas: Winter Fun (USA)	96 cents	Susan Scott	Susan Scott	Lithography in 8 colours	Tullis Russell Coatings	Snowflake, Manitoba
3 November 2008	Christmas: Winter Fun (International)	$1.60	Susan Scott	Susan Scott	Lithography in 8 colours	Tullis Russell Coatings	Snowflake, Manitoba

== 2009 ==
Date of Issue	Theme	Denomination	Design	Illustration	Printing Process	Paper Type	First Day Cover Cancellation
8 January 2009	Year of the Ox	Permanent (Domestic Rate)	Ivan Novotny	Ivan Novotny	Lithography in 6 colours plus two foil stampings and embossing plus varnish	Tullis Russell Coatings	Toronto, ON
8 January 2009	Year of the Ox	$1.65	Ivan Novotny	Ivan Novotny	Lithography in 6 colours plus two foil stampings and embossing plus varnish	Tullis Russell Coatings	Toronto, ON
12 January 2009	Vancouver 2010 Paralympic Games: Ice sledge hockey	Permanent (Domestic Rate)	John Belisle, Kosta Tsetsekas	John Belisle, Kosta Tsetsekas	Lithography in 5 colours	Tullis Russell Coatings	Whistler and Vancouver, BC
12 January 2009	Vancouver 2010 Winter Games: Snowboard	Permanent (Domestic Rate)	John Belisle, Kosta Tsetsekas	John Belisle, Kosta Tsetsekas	Lithography in 5 colours	Tullis Russell Coatings	Whistler and Vancouver, BC
12 January 2009	Vancouver 2010 Winter Games: Freestyle Skiing	Permanent (Domestic Rate)	John Belisle, Kosta Tsetsekas	John Belisle, Kosta Tsetsekas	Lithography in 5 colours	Tullis Russell Coatings	Whistler and Vancouver, BC
12 January 2009	Vancouver 2010 Winter Games: Bobsleigh	Permanent (Domestic Rate)	John Belisle, Kosta Tsetsekas	John Belisle, Kosta Tsetsekas	Lithography in 5 colours	Tullis Russell Coatings	Whistler and Vancouver, BC
12 January 2009	Vancouver 2010 Winter Games: Curling	Permanent (Domestic Rate)	John Belisle, Kosta Tsetsekas	John Belisle, Kosta Tsetsekas	Lithography in 5 colours	Tullis Russell Coatings	Whistler and Vancouver, BC
12 January 2009	Vancouver 2010 Paralympic Games: Emblem	Permanent (Domestic Rate)	VANOC	VANOC	Lithography in 5 colours	Tullis Russell Coatings	Vancouver, BC
12 January 2009	Vancouver 2010 Winter Games: Innukshuk Emblem	Permanent (Domestic Rate)	VANOC	VANOC	Lithography in 5 colours	Tullis Russell Coatings	Vancouver, BC
12 January 2009	Vancouver 2010 Winter Games Mascots: Miga	98 cents	VANOC	VANOC	Lithography in 5 colours	Tullis Russell Coatings	Richmond, BC
12 January 2009	Vancouver 2010 Winter Games Mascots: Quatchi	$1.65	VANOC	VANOC	Lithography in 5 colours	Tullis Russell Coatings	Richmond, BC
12 January 2009	Vancouver 2010 Paralympic Games Mascots: Sumi	$1.18	VANOC	VANOC	Lithography in 5 colours	Tullis Russell Coatings	Richmond, BC
12 January 2009	Definitive:Queen Elizabeth II	Permanent (Domestic Rate)	Gottschalk + Ash International	Gottschalk + Ash International	Lithography in 5 colours	Tullis Russell Coatings	Calgary, Alberta
2 April 2009	International Year of Astronomy	54 cents	Keith Martin	Photo by Canada-France-Hawaii telescope	Lithography in 10 colours	Tullis Russell Coatings	Saanich, British Columbia
9 April 2009	Preserving the Poles	54 cents	Tilt Telmet, Wade Stewart	Amanda Byrd, Michael Quinton, Paul Nicken, Arthur Morris, Ralph Eldridge, Jan Will	Lithography in 6 colours	Tullis Russell Coatings	Eureka, Nunavut
22 April 2009	Low Value Definitives:Beneficial Insects	2 cents	Keith Martin	Keith Martin	Lithography in 5 colours	Tullis Russell Coatings	Leamington, Ontario
15 May 2009	Canadian Horse and Newfoundland Pony	54 cents	Wilco Design	Wilson Lam, Bonnie Yam	Lithography in 5 colours	Tullis Russell Coatings	Cap-Rouge, QC and Change Islands, NL
1 June 2009	Canadian Diplomacy	54 cents	Parable Communications	Cartesia and Marc Fowler	Lithography in 7 colours plus varnish	Tullis Russell Coatings	Ottawa, ON
12 June 2009	Boundary Waters Treaty of 1909	54 cents	Paul Haslip	Alex Henderson Musee, McCord Museum	Lithography in 8 colours	Tullis Russell Coatings	Cardston, AB
2 July 2009	Canadian Recording Artists: Bryan Adams	54 cents	CIRCLE	Photo by Bryan Adams	Lithography in 9 colours plus varnish	Tullis Russell Coatings	Timmins, Ontario and Paquetville, NB
2 July 2009	Canadian Recording Artists: Édith Butler	54 cents	CIRCLE	Photo by Pierre Dury	Lithography in 9 colours plus varnish	Tullis Russell Coatings	Timmins, Ontario and Paquetville, NB
2 July 2009	Canadian Recording Artists: Robert Charlebois	54 cents	CIRCLE	Photo by Manon Boyer	Lithography in 9 colours plus varnish	Tullis Russell Coatings	Timmins, Ontario and Paquetville, NB
2 July 2009	Canadian Recording Artists: Stompin Tom Connors	54 cents	CIRCLE	Photo by Art Stanton	Lithography in 9 colours plus varnish	Tullis Russell Coatings	Timmins, Ontario and Paquetville, NB
6 July 2009	Roadside Attractions: Inukshuk in Hay River, NWT	54 cents	Bonnie Ross	Photo by iStock Photo; CanStock Photo, BigStock	Lithography in 7 colours plus varnish	Tullis Russell Coatings	Prince George, British Columbia
6 July 2009	Roadside Attractions: Mr. PG	54 cents	Bonnie Ross	Photo by iStock Photo; CanStock Photo, BigStock	Lithography in 7 colours plus varnish	Tullis Russell Coatings	Prince George, British Columbia
6 July 2009	Roadside Attractions: Pysanka, Elk Island National Park	54 cents	Bonnie Ross	Photo by iStock Photo; CanStock Photo, BigStock	Lithography in 7 colours plus varnish	Tullis Russell Coatings	Prince George, British Columbia
6 July 2009	Roadside Attractions: Watson Lake Signpost Forests	54 cents	Bonnie Ross	Photo by iStock Photo; CanStock Photo, BigStock	Lithography in 7 colours plus varnish	Tullis Russell Coatings	Prince George, British Columbia
10 July 2009	Captain Robert Bartlett	54 cents	Karen Smith Design	Photo by Mike Beedell Photography	Lithography in 7 colours plus varnish	Tullis Russell Coatings	Brigus, Newfoundland and Labrador
10 August 2009	Canadian Inventions: Sports, Basketball	54 cents	q30 design inc.	Photo by Canadian Museum of Civilization (Artifact 111-1-468)	Lithography in 4 colours	Tullis Russell Coatings	Guelph and =North Bay, Ontario
10 August 2009	Canadian Inventions: Sports, Five-pin bowling	54 cents	q30 design inc.	Photo by Canadian Museum of Civilization (Artifact 111-1-468)	Lithography in 4 colours	Tullis Russell Coatings	Guelph and =North Bay, Ontario
10 August 2009	Canadian Inventions: Sports, Lacrosse	54 cents	q30 design inc.	Photo by Edward Pond	Lithography in 4 colours	Tullis Russell Coatings	Guelph and =North Bay, Ontario
10 August 2009	Canadian Inventions: Sports, Ringette	54 cents	q30 design inc.	Photo by Canadian Museum of Civilization (Artifact 111-1-468)	Lithography in 4 colours	Tullis Russell Coatings	Guelph and =North Bay, Ontario

=== Upcoming releases 2009 ===
Month	Theme
October	Canadian War Heroes
November	Christmas Tree
November	Christmas: Religious

=== Upcoming releases 2010 ===
Month	Theme
January	Flags over Historic Mills
January	Queen Elizabeth II
January	Orchids
January	Year of the Tiger
January	Vancouver 2010 Olympics
February	William Hall
February	Vancouver 2010 closing ceremonies
March	African Violets
April	Art Canada: Prudence Hayward
May	Canadian Navy, 100th Anniversary
May	Sweden/Canada Joint Issue: Marine Wildlife
June	Canadian Geographic Photography Contest
June	Rotary International in Canada: 100th Anniversary
July	Roadside Attractions
July	Girl Guides of Canada: 100th Anniversary
August	Cupids, 400th Anniversary
August	Blue Whale
September	Four Indian Kings
October	Home Children
November	Christmas Ornaments
November	Nativity Scene

== Commemorative envelopes ==
Date of Issue	Theme	Design	Quantity
8 May 2005	Canada's War Brides	Canada Post Graphic Design Group	10,000
26 May 2005	The Royal Regiment of Canadian Artillery	Canada Post Graphic Design Group	10,000
27 May 2005	City of London: 1855-2005	Canada Post Graphic Design Group	10,000
28 May 2006	Benjamin Franklin	Canada Post Graphic Design Group	10,000
12 October 2006	Hungarian Immigration: 1956-2006	Canada Post Graphic Design Group	10,000
16 October 2006	Canada Post Corporation: 1981-2006	Canada Post Graphic Design Group	72,500
8 February 2007	Purdy's Chocolates Commemorative Envelope	Canada Post Graphic Design Group	10,000
10 September 2007	Glenn Gould	Canada Post Graphic Design Group	10,000
1 August 2007	L'association des scouts du Canada	Canada Post Graphic Design Group	15,000
2 November 2007	Santa Letterwriting Program	Canada Post Graphic Design Group	10,000
21 April 2008	Montreal Association for the Blind	Canada Post Graphic Design Group	11,000
29 April 2008	Public Service Commission of Canada	Canada Post Graphic Design Group	13,000
20 June 2008	St. John Ambulance in Canada	Canada Post Graphic Design Group	10,000
1 October 2008	Christmas Seal	Canada Post Graphic Design Group	10,000
8 July 2009	80 Years of Canada/Japan Diplomatic Relations	Canada Post Graphic Design Group	10,000

== Conservation stamps ==
Conservation stamps and stamp products are issued on an annual basis. These are issued by Quebec Wildlife Foundation and help to fund initiatives tied to the preservation, restoration, and protection of Quebec's wildlife habitat. These annual issues are featured in the Canada Post Stamp Details Magazine.

Date of Issue	Theme	Design	Description	Issue Price
1 April 2005	Snowshoe Hare	Pierre Leduc	Artist proof, imperf, signed and numbered (325 issued)	$100.00
1 April 2005	Snowshoe Hare	Pierre Leduc	First Day Cover Numbered	$25.00
1 April 2005	Snowshoe Hare	Pierre Leduc	Souvenir Booklet of 1 stamp	$10.00
1 April 2005	Snowshoe Hare	Pierre Leduc	Souvenir Sheet of 4 stamps	$40.00
1 April 2005	Snowshoe Hare	Pierre Leduc	World Wildlife Fund First Day Cover	$30.00
1 April 2005	Snowshoe Hare	Pierre Leduc	World Wildlife Fund Souvenir Booklet	$12.50
1 April 2005	Snowshoe Hare	Pierre Leduc	World Wildlife Fund Souvenir Booklet, 1 stamp surcharged and imperforated	$35.00
2007	Morning Post - Wilson's Snipe	Nigel Shaw	Artist proof, imperf, signed and numbered (325 issued)	$100.00
2007	Morning Post - Wilson's Snipe	Nigel Shaw	First Day Cover Numbered (350 issued)	$25.00
2007	Morning Post - Wilson's Snipe	Nigel Shaw	Souvenir Booklet of 1 stamp	$10.00
2007	Morning Post - Wilson's Snipe	Nigel Shaw	Souvenir Sheet of 4 stamps	$40.00
2007	Morning Post - Wilson's Snipe	Nigel Shaw	World Wildlife Fund First Day Cover (400 issued)	$30.00
2007	Morning Post - Wilson's Snipe	Nigel Shaw	World Wildlife Fund Souvenir Booklet	$12.50
2007	Morning Post - Wilson's Snipe	Nigel Shaw	World Wildlife Fund Souvenir Booklet, 1 stamp surcharged and imperforated (500 issued)	$35.00
2008	Polar Bear	Pierre Leduc	Souvenir Booklet (1 stamp)	$10.00
2008	Polar Bear	Pierre Leduc	World Wildlife Fund Souvenir Booklet (1 stamp)	$12.50
2008	Polar Bear	Pierre Leduc	Souvenir Sheet of 4 stamps	$40.00
2008	Polar Bear	Pierre Leduc	Souvenir Sheet of 4 stamps, Artist Proof (signed and numbered)	$100.00
2008	Polar Bear	Pierre Leduc	World Wildlife Fund Souvenir Booklet 1 stamp (surcharged, imperforated)	$35.00
2008	Polar Bear	Pierre Leduc	First Day Cover	$25.00
2008	Polar Bear	Pierre Leduc	World Wildlife Fund First Day Cover	$30.00
2008	Polar Bear	Pierre Leduc	Canadian Wildlife Habitat Conservation Stamp First Day Cover	$35.00

== Gutter Strips ==
Date of Issue	Theme	# of stamps on strip	Quantity Produced	Issue Price
12 February 2007	International Polar Year	8	5,000	$4.16
20 July 2007	Terra Nova and Jasper National Park	10	25,000	$5.20
7 March 2008	University of Alberta and University of British Columbia	8	15,000	$4.16

== Stamp survey ==
On an annual basis, Canadian Stamp News holds an annual survey. This gives collectors the opportunity to voice their opinions on what are their favourite stamps, and least favourite stamps. The categories include: Favourite Canadian Stamps, Most Relevant Stamps, Least Favourite Stamps, Least Relevant Stamps. The results are as follows: THIS IS A WORK IN PROGRESS. ANYONE WITH DETAILS IS WELCOME TO CONTRIBUTE.

=== 2006 ===
==== Favourite Canadian stamps ====
Stamp	Votes	Percentage
Gardens	971	16.8%
Duck Decoys	606	10.5%
Wine and Cheese	568	9.8%

==== Most relevant stamps ====
Stamp	Votes	Percentage
Atlas of Canada	1,324	24.2%
Snowbirds	910	16.7%
Champlain Surveys the East Coast	629	11.5%

==== Least favourite stamps ====
Stamp	Votes	Percentage
McClelland and Stewart	883	16%
Society of Graphic Designers of Canada	650	11.8%
Birthday	606	11%

==== Least relevant stamps ====
Stamp	Votes	Percentage
Year of the Dog	1,214	22.2%
Birthday	848	15.5%
Wine and Cheese	518	9.5%

=== 2007 ===
==== Favourite Canadian stamps ====
Stamp	Votes	Percentage
Beneficial Insects	877	17.4%
Lilacs	719	14.3%
Art Canada: Mary Pratt	1919	8.8%

==== Most relevant stamps ====
Stamp	Votes	Percentage
Ottawa: 1857-2007	1,919	38.1%
Canadian Recording Artists	642	12.8%
Endangered Species	402	8%

==== Least favourite stamps ====
Stamp	Votes	Percentage
Celebration	1,158	23.3%
Year of the Pig	501	10.1%
Law Society of Saskatchewan	495	10%

==== Least relevant stamps ====
Stamp	Votes	Percentage
Year of the Pig	1,966	40.9%
Celebration	980	20.4%
FIFA Under 20 World Cup	332	6.9%

== Choosing Canada's stamps ==
Although Canada Post is responsible for stamp design and production, the corporation does not actually choose the subjects or the final designs that appear on stamps. That task falls under the jurisprudence of the Stamp Advisory Committee. Their objective is to recommend a balanced stamp program that will have broad-based appeal, regionally and culturally, reflecting Canadian history, heritage, and tradition.

Before Canada Post calls a meeting of the committee, it also welcomes suggestions for stamp subjects from Canadian citizens. Ideas for subjects that have recently appeared on a stamp are declined. The committee works two years in advance and can approve approximately 20 subjects for each year.

Once a stamp subject is selected, Canada Post's Stamp Products group conducts research. Designs are commissioned from two firms, both chosen for their expertise. The designs are presented anonymously to the committee. The committee's process and selection policy have changed little in the thirty years since it was introduced.

Any ideas for a stamp should be sent to: Chairperson of the Stamp Advisory Committee, Canada Post, 2701 Riverside Drive Suite N1070, Ottawa, ON, K1A 0B1.

== Philatelic Awards ==
Canada Post won the Desheng Cup for best printing of a stamp at the 5th Annual Best Foreign Stamp Poll. The cup was awarded for the Big Cats Canada/China joint issue, featuring the Canadian cougar and Amur leopard. Canada Post and Bradbury Branding and Design won a Promotional or Specialty Items Award of Honour in 2006 from ACE Awards. The award was won for the Saskatchewan 1905-2005 stamp issue.

In 2006, Canada Post and the Lowe-Martin Group were honoured with three awards from the 32nd Annual IAPHC International Gallery of Superb Printing for superb craftsmanship in the production of stamps. Gold awards were received for the Year of the Dog Uncut Press Sheet and the Biosphere Reserves Canada/Ireland joint issue, featuring the Canadian cougar and Amur leopard. The IAPHC is an international organization dedicated to the development, promotion, and success of the printing and graphic art industry in society.
