= Martin Mörck =

Engraver of postage stamps and banknotes

Martin Mörck (born 8 June 1955) is a Swedish-born Norwegian artist and engraver of postage stamps and banknotes.

Mörck was born in Gothenburg, Sweden into a family of artists; a mother being a textile artist and a father being a graphic designer. He began a study of shipbuilding, a study he did not complete. In 1975, after a study in art, he became apprentice as an engraver under the supervision of Arne Wallhorn at the Swedish postal service. Mörck first postage stamp engraving is of a tawny owl and was issued as a Swedish postage stamp. Since then, Mörck has had more than 600 engravings issued as postage stamps, primarily engraved for the postal services of the Nordic countries, but also for the postal services of France, Monaco, Canada, Greenland, Latvia and others.
