= Suzanne Duranceau =

Canadian illustrator living in Montreal

Suzanne Duranceau (born August 2, 1952) is a Canadian illustrator living in Montreal.

She was born in Montreal and studied French literature at the Cégep de Saint-Laurent and painting and etching at the École des beaux-arts de Montréal. She studied animation at the National Film Board of Canada. Then, in the early 1980s, she began her career as an illustrator for children's books.

She was a founding member of Illustration Québec (Association des illustrateurs et illustratrices du Québec) and served as its president from 1983 to 1985. In 1992, she was president of the Canadian Association of Photographers and Illustrators in Communication. She has taught language of visual arts and drawing at the Collège Ahuntsic.

Her work has appeared on a number of stamps issued by Canada Post and on coins issued by the Royal Canadian Mint.

Duranceau received the Prix Communication-Jeunesse/Culinar in 1981. In the same year, she received the annual show award from the Houston Society of Illustrators. In 1992, she was named to the short list for a Governor General's Award for Literary Merit. She has served on juries for various awards, including the Governor General's Awards.

== Selected works ==
- Nuits magiques, text by Jean-Marie Poupart (1982)
- Millicent and the Wind, text by Robert Munsch (1984)
- No Place Like Home, Smithsonian Art Print (1990)
- Hickory, Dickory, Dock, text

by Robin Muller (1994), received the CAPIC (Canadian Association of professional image creators) annual award

- Follow the Moon, text by Sarah Weeks (1995)
- Love Can Build a Bridge, text by Naomi Judd (1999)
- Piece of Jungle, text by Sarah Weeks, 1999
- Munschworks 4: The Fourth Munsch Treasury, text by Robert Munsch (2002)
